= History of magic =

History of supernatural phenomena

The history of magic extends from the earliest literate cultures, who relied on charms, divination and spells to interpret and influence the forces of nature. Non-literate societies, as well, exhibit traditions of folk magic that have informed the interpretation of prehistoric artifacts, cave art and monuments. Magic and what would later be called science were often practiced together, with the notable examples of astrology and alchemy, before the Scientific Revolution of the late European Renaissance moved to separate science from magic on the basis of repeatable observation. Despite this loss of prestige, the use of magic has continued both in its traditional role, and among modern occultists who seek to adapt it for a scientific world.

== Ancient practitioners ==
=== Mesopotamia ===
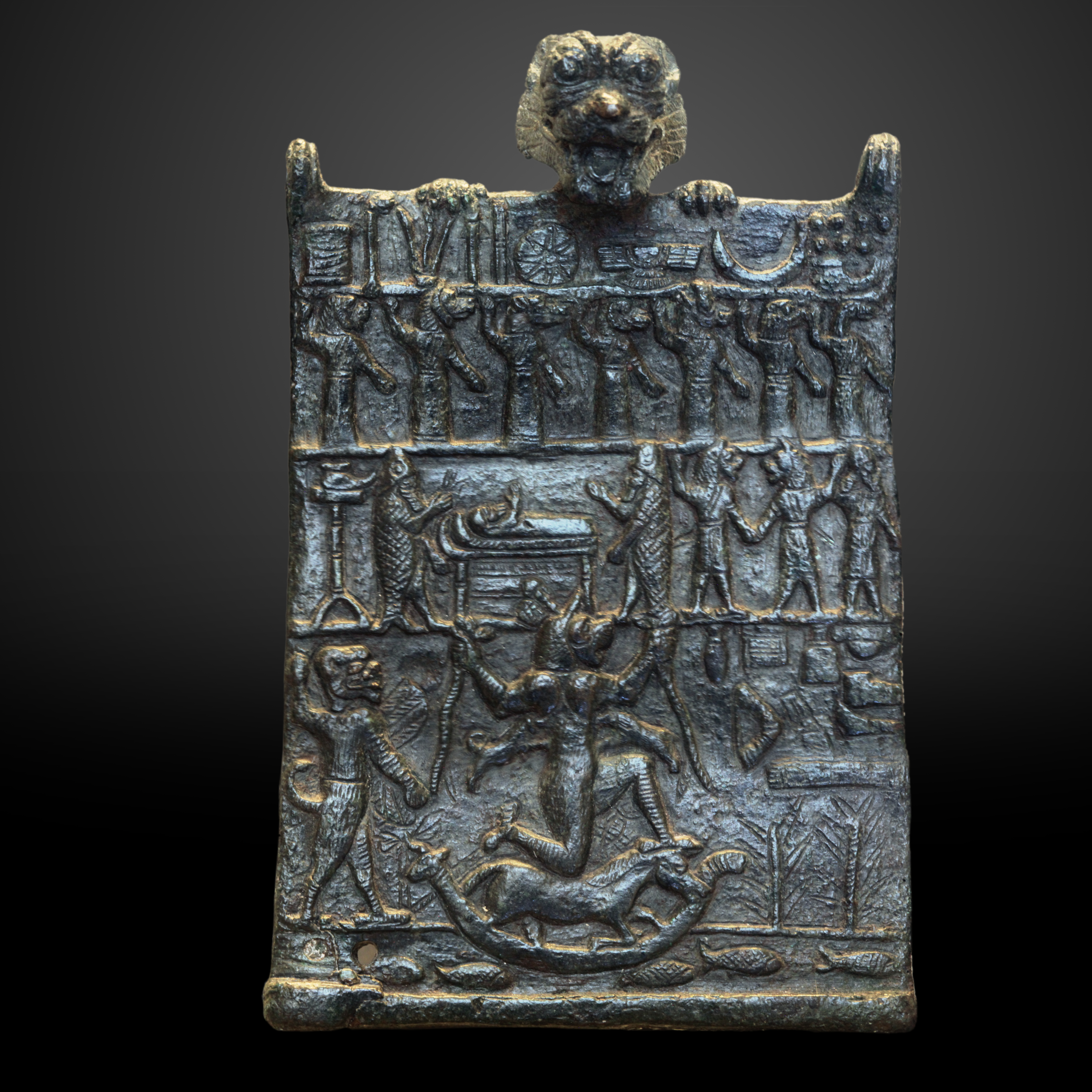
Bronze protection plaque from the Neo-Assyrian era showing the demon Lamashtu

Magic was invoked in many kinds of rituals and medical formulae, and to counteract evil omens. Defensive or legitimate magic in Mesopotamia (asiputu or masmassutu in the Akkadian language) were incantations and ritual practices intended to alter specific realities. The ancient Mesopotamians believed that magic was the only viable defense against demons, ghosts, and evil sorcerers. To defend themselves against the spirits of those they had wronged, they would leave offerings known as kispu in the person's tomb in hope of appeasing them. If that failed, they also sometimes took a figurine of the deceased and buried it in the ground, demanding for the gods to eradicate the spirit, or force it to leave the person alone.

The ancient Mesopotamians also used magic intending to protect themselves from evil sorcerers who might place curses on them. Black magic as a category didn't exist in ancient Mesopotamia, and a person legitimately using magic to defend themselves against illegitimate magic would use exactly the same techniques. The only major difference was that curses were enacted in secret; whereas a defense against sorcery was conducted in the open, in front of an audience if possible. One ritual to punish a sorcerer was known as Maqlû, or "The Burning". The person viewed as being afflicted by witchcraft would create an effigy of the sorcerer and put it on trial at night. Then, once the nature of the sorcerer's crimes had been determined, the person would burn the effigy and thereby break the sorcerer's power over them.

The ancient Mesopotamians also performed magical rituals to purify themselves of sins committed unknowingly. One such ritual was known as the Šurpu, or "Burning", in which the caster of the spell would transfer the guilt for all their misdeeds onto various objects such as a strip of dates, an onion, and a tuft of wool. The person would then burn the objects and thereby purify themself of all sins that they might have unknowingly committed. A whole genre of love spells existed. Such spells were believed to cause a person to fall in love with another person, restore love which had faded, or cause a male sexual partner to be able to sustain an erection when he had previously been unable. Other spells were used to reconcile a man with his patron deity or to reconcile a wife with a husband who had been neglecting her.

The ancient Mesopotamians made no distinction between rational science and magic. When a person became ill, doctors would prescribe both magical formulas to be recited as well as medicinal treatments. Most magical rituals were intended to be performed by an āšipu, an expert in the magical arts. The profession was generally passed down from generation to generation and was held in extremely high regard and often served as advisors to kings and great leaders. An āšipu probably served not only as a magician, but also as a physician, a priest, a scribe, and a scholar.

The Sumerian god Enki, who was later syncretized with the East Semitic god Era, was closely associated with magic and incantations; he was the patron god of the bārȗ and the ašipū and was widely regarded as the ultimate source of all arcane knowledge. The ancient Mesopotamians also believed in omens, which could come when solicited or unsolicited. Regardless of how they came, omens were always taken with the utmost seriousness.

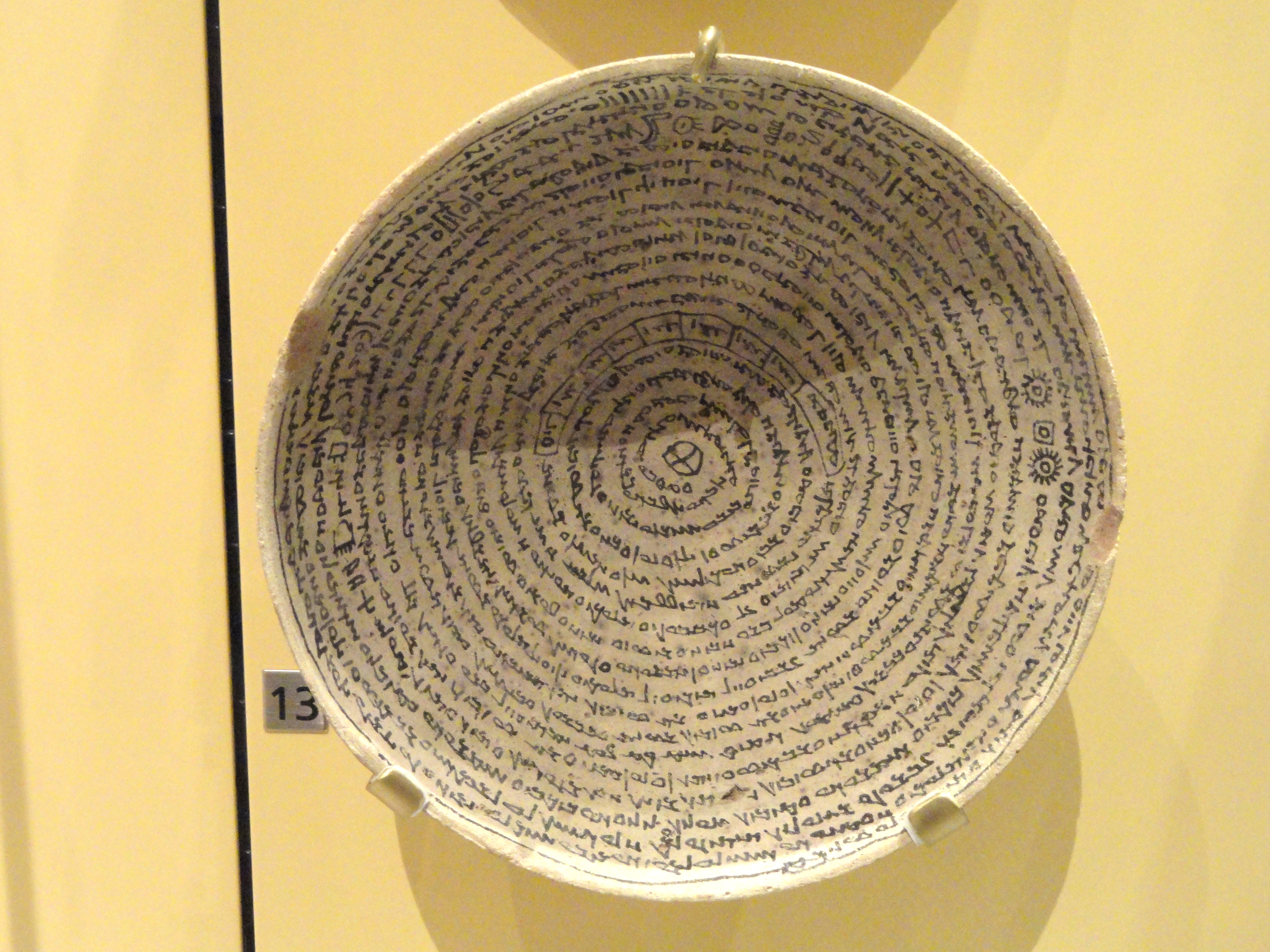
Mandaic-language incantation bowl

A common set of shared assumptions about the causes of evil and how to avert it are found in a form of early protective magic called incantation bowl or magic bowls. The bowls were produced in the Middle East, particularly in Upper Mesopotamia and Syria, what is now Iraq and Iran, and fairly popular during the sixth to eighth centuries. The bowls were buried face down and were meant to capture demons. They were commonly placed under the threshold, courtyards, in the corner of the homes of the recently deceased and in cemeteries.

=== Egypt ===
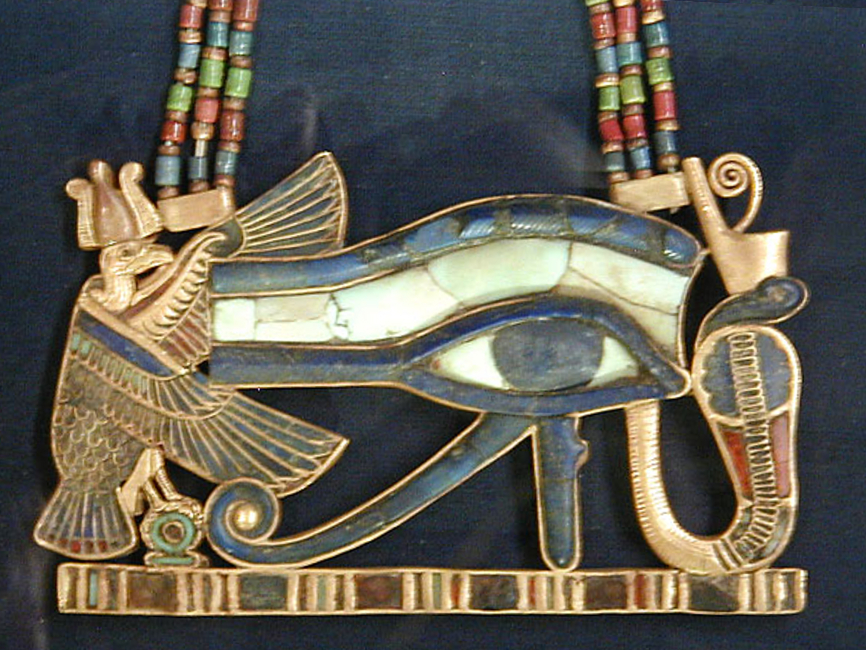
Ancient Egyptian Eye of Horus amulet

In ancient Egypt (Kemet in the Egyptian language), Magic (personified as the god heka) was an integral part of religion and culture which is known to us through a substantial corpus of texts which are products of the Egyptian tradition.

While the category magic has been contentious for modern Egyptology, there is clear support for its applicability from ancient terminology. The Coptic term hik is the descendant of the pharaonic term heka, which, unlike its Coptic counterpart, had no connotation of impiety or illegality, and is attested from the Old Kingdom through to the Roman era. Heka was considered morally neutral and was applied to the practices and beliefs of both foreigners and Egyptians alike. The Instructions for Merikare informs us that heka was a beneficence gifted by the creator to humanity "... in order to be weapons to ward off the blow of events".

Magic was practiced by both the literate priestly hierarchy and by illiterate farmers and herdsmen, and the principle of heka underlay all ritual activity, both in the temples and in private settings.

The main principle of heka is centered on the power of words to bring things into being. Karenga explains the pivotal power of words and their vital ontological role as the primary tool used by the creator to bring the manifest world into being. Because humans were understood to share a divine nature with the gods, snnw ntr (images of the god), the same power to use words creatively that the gods have is shared by humans.

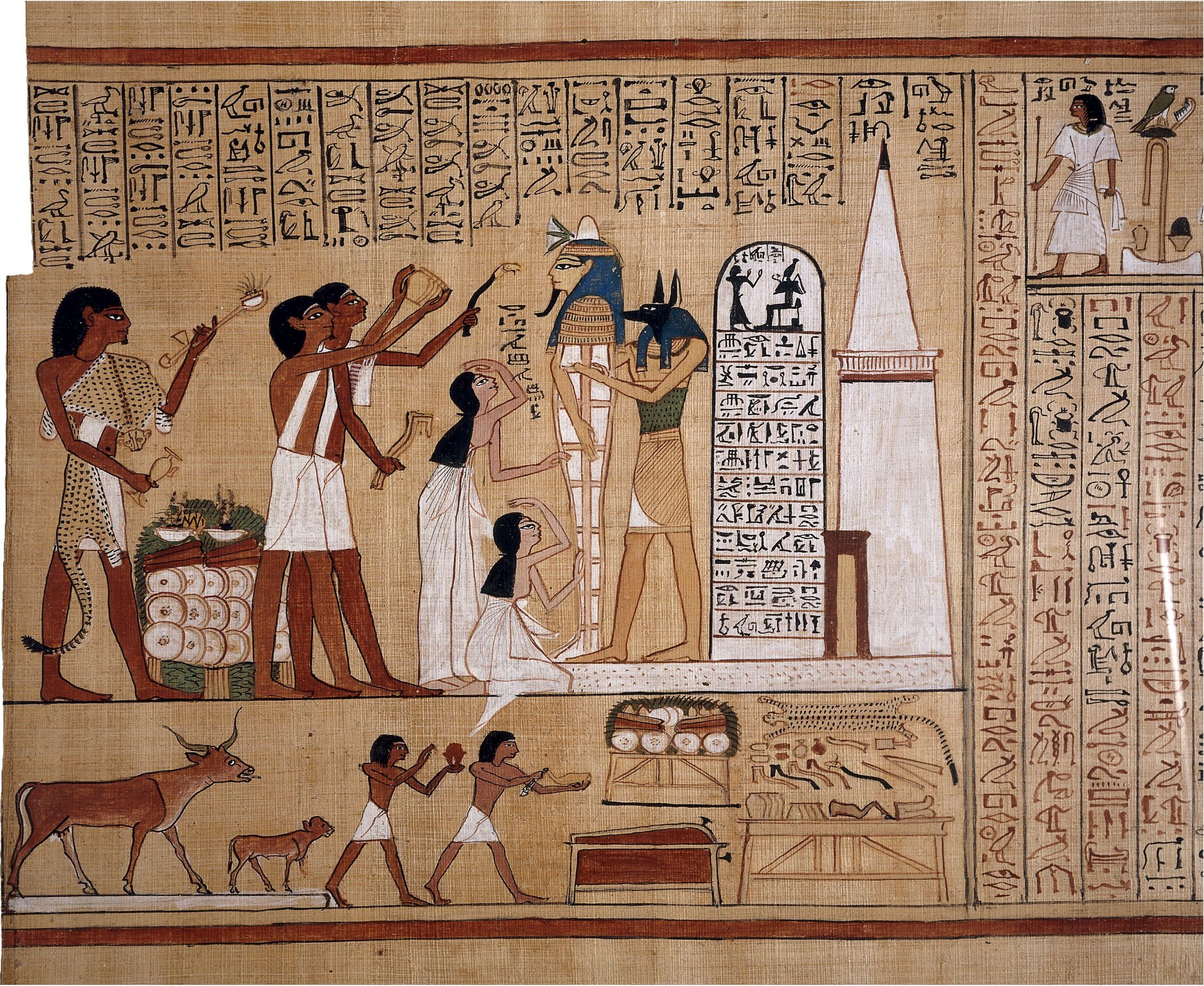
Illustration from the Book of the Dead of Hunefer showing the Opening of the Mouth ceremony being performed before the tomb

The use of amulets, (meket) was widespread among both living and dead ancient Egyptians. They were used for protection and as a means of "...reaffirming the fundamental fairness of the universe". The oldest amulets found are from the predynastic Badarian Period, and they persisted through to Roman times.

==== Book of the Dead ====
The Book of the Dead were a series of texts written in Ancient Egypt with various spells to help guide the Egyptians in the afterlife.

The interior walls of the pyramid of Unas, the final pharaoh of the Egyptian Fifth Dynasty, are covered in hundreds of magical spells and inscriptions, running from floor to ceiling in vertical columns. These inscriptions are known as the Pyramid Texts and they contain spells needed by the pharaoh in order to survive in the Afterlife. The Pyramid Texts were strictly for royalty only; the spells were kept secret from commoners and were written only inside royal tombs. During the chaos and unrest of the First Intermediate Period, however, tomb robbers broke into the pyramids and saw the magical inscriptions. Commoners began learning the spells and, by the beginning of the Middle Kingdom, commoners began inscribing similar writings on the sides of their own coffins, hoping that doing so would ensure their own survival in the afterlife. These writings are known as the Coffin Texts.

After a person died, his or her corpse would be mummified and wrapped in linen bandages to ensure that the deceased's body would survive for as long as possible because the Egyptians believed that a person's soul could only survive in the afterlife for as long as his or her physical body survived here on earth. The last ceremony before a person's body was sealed away inside the tomb was known as the Opening of the Mouth. In this ritual, the priests would touch various magical instruments to various parts of the deceased's body, thereby giving the deceased the ability to see, hear, taste, and smell in the afterlife.

==== Spells ====
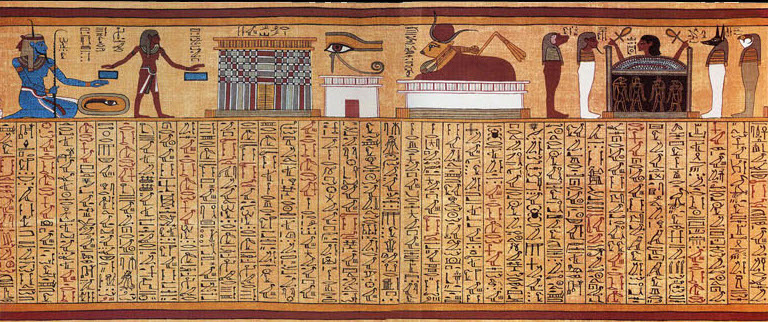
The mystical Spell 17, from the Papyrus of Ani. The vignette at the top illustrates, from left to right, the god Heh as a representation of the Sea; a gateway to the realm of Osiris; the Eye of Horus; the celestial cow Mehet-Weret; and a human head rising from a coffin, guarded by the four Sons of Horus.

The Book of the Dead is made up of a number of individual texts and their accompanying illustrations. Most sub-texts begin with the word ro, which can mean "mouth", "speech", "spell", "utterance", "incantation", or "chapter of a book". This ambiguity reflects the similarity in Egyptian thought between ritual speech and magical power. In the context of the Book of the Dead, it is typically translated as either chapter or spell. In this article, the word spell is used.

At present, some 192 spells are known, though no single manuscript contains them all. They served a range of purposes. Some are intended to give the deceased mystical knowledge in the afterlife, or perhaps to identify them with the gods: for instance, Spell 17 is an obscure and lengthy description of the god Atum. Others are incantations to ensure the different elements of the dead person's being were preserved and reunited, and to give the deceased control over the world around him. Still others protect the deceased from various hostile forces or guide him through the underworld past various obstacles. Famously, two spells also deal with the judgement of the deceased in the Weighing of the Heart ritual.

Such spells as 26–30, and sometimes spells 6 and 126, relate to the heart and were inscribed on scarabs.

The texts and images of the Book of the Dead were magical as well as religious. Magic was as legitimate an activity as praying to the gods, even when the magic was aimed at controlling the gods themselves. Indeed, there was little distinction for the Ancient Egyptians between magical and religious practice. The concept of magic (heka) was also intimately linked with the spoken and written word. The act of speaking a ritual formula was an act of creation; there is a sense in which action and speech were one and the same thing. The magical power of words extended to the written word. Hieroglyphic script was held to have been invented by the god Thoth, and the hieroglyphs themselves were powerful. Written words conveyed the full force of a spell. This was even true when the text was abbreviated or omitted, as often occurred in later Book of the Dead scrolls, particularly if the accompanying images were present. The Egyptians also believed that knowing the name of something gave power over it; thus, the Book of the Dead equips its owner with the mystical names of many of the entities he would encounter in the afterlife, giving him power over them.

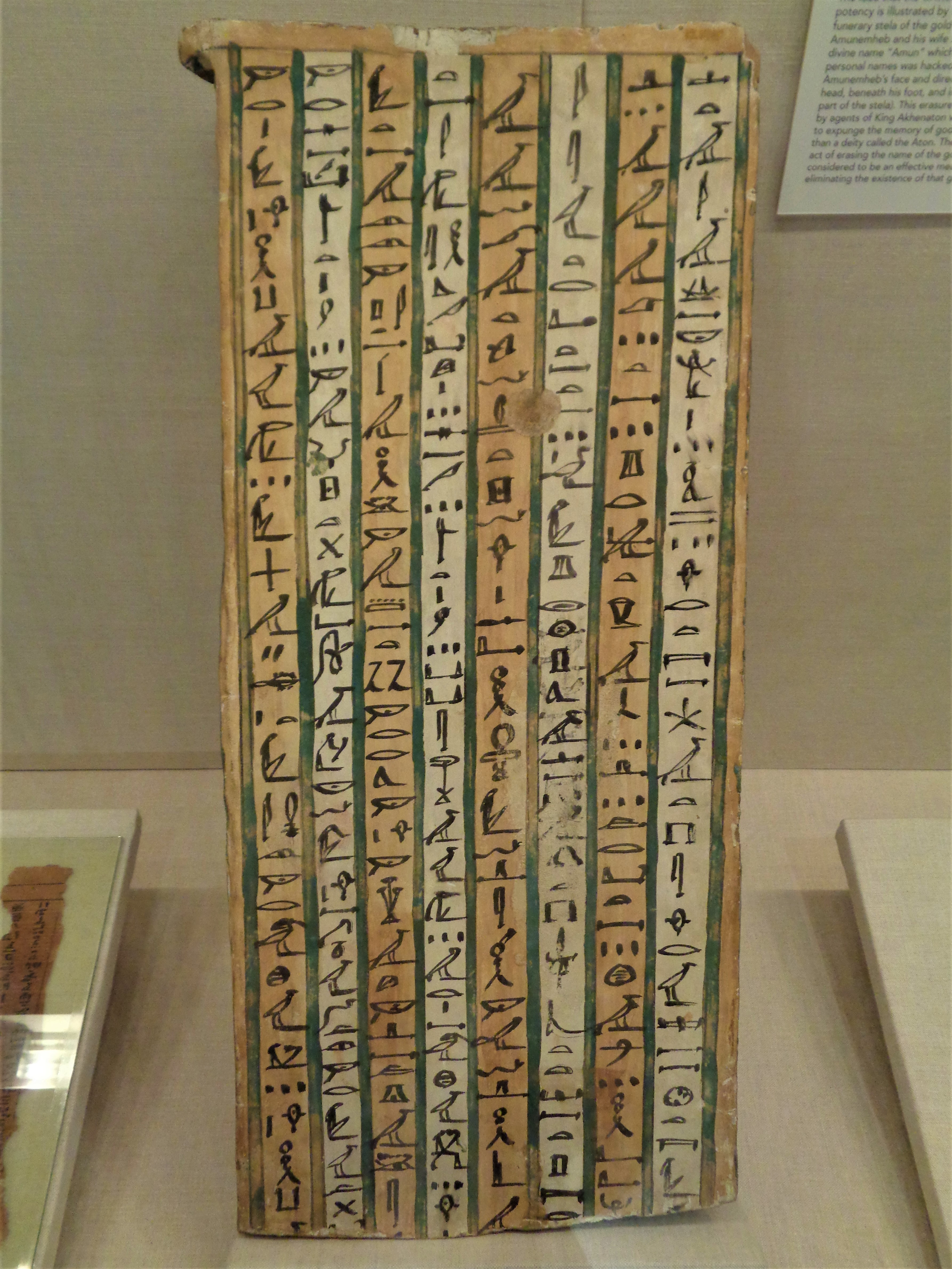
Egyptian Book of the Dead, painted on a coffin fragment (c. 747–656 BCE): Spell 79 (attaching the soul to the body); and Spell 80 (preventing incoherent speech)

The spells of the Book of the Dead made use of several magical techniques which can also be seen in other areas of Egyptian life. A number of spells are for magical amulets, which would protect the deceased from harm. In addition to being represented on a Book of the Dead papyrus, these spells appeared on amulets wound into the wrappings of a mummy. Everyday magic made use of amulets in huge numbers. Other items in direct contact with the body in the tomb, such as headrests, were also considered to have amuletic value. A number of spells also refer to Egyptian beliefs about the magical healing power of saliva.

=== Judea ===
Halakha (Jewish religious law) forbids divination and other forms of soothsaying, and the Talmud lists many persistent yet condemned divining practices. Practical Kabbalah in historical Judaism, is a branch of the Jewish mystical tradition that concerns the use of magic. It was considered permitted white magic by its practitioners, reserved for the elite, who could separate its spiritual source from qlipoothic realms of evil if performed under circumstances that were holy (Q-D-Š) and pure (טומאה וטהרה, tvmh vthrh). The concern of overstepping Judaism's strong prohibitions of impure magic ensured it remained a minor tradition in Jewish history. Its teachings include the use of Divine and angelic names for amulets and incantations. These magical practices of Judaic folk religion which became part of practical Kabbalah date from Talmudic times. The Talmud mentions the use of charms for healing, and a wide range of magical cures were sanctioned by rabbis. It was ruled that any practice actually producing a cure was not to be regarded superstitiously and there has been the widespread practice of medicinal amulets, and folk remedies (segullot) in Jewish societies across time and geography.

Jewish law views the practice of witchcraft as being laden with idolatry and/or necromancy; both being serious theological and practical offenses in Judaism. Although Maimonides vigorously denied the efficacy of all methods of witchcraft, and claimed that the Biblical prohibitions regarding it were precisely to wean the Israelites from practices related to idolatry. It is acknowledged that while magic exists, it is forbidden to practice it on the basis that it usually involves the worship of other gods. Rabbis of the Talmud also condemned magic when it produced something other than illusion, giving the example of two men who use magic to pick cucumbers. The one who creates the illusion of picking cucumbers should not be condemned, only the one who actually picks the cucumbers through magic.

Although magic was forbidden by Levitical law in the Hebrew Bible, magic relates to Jewish mysticism, and Gideon Bohak believes magical "technology" could have been widely practised in the late Second Temple period, and in the period following the destruction of the temple into the 3rd, 4th, and 5th centuries C.E. Jewish and Samaritan magicians appear in the New Testament, Acts of the Apostles, and also in the works of Josephus, such as Atomos, a Jewish magician of Cyprus (Antiquities of the Jews 20:142).

A subcategory of incantation bowls are those used in Jewish magical practice. Aramaic incantation bowls are an important source of knowledge about Jewish magical practices.

Judaism does make it clear that Jews shall not try to learn about the ways of witches and that witches are to be put to death. Judaism's most famous reference to a medium is undoubtedly the Witch of Endor whom Saul consults, as recounted in 1 Samuel 28.

=== Greco-Roman world ===
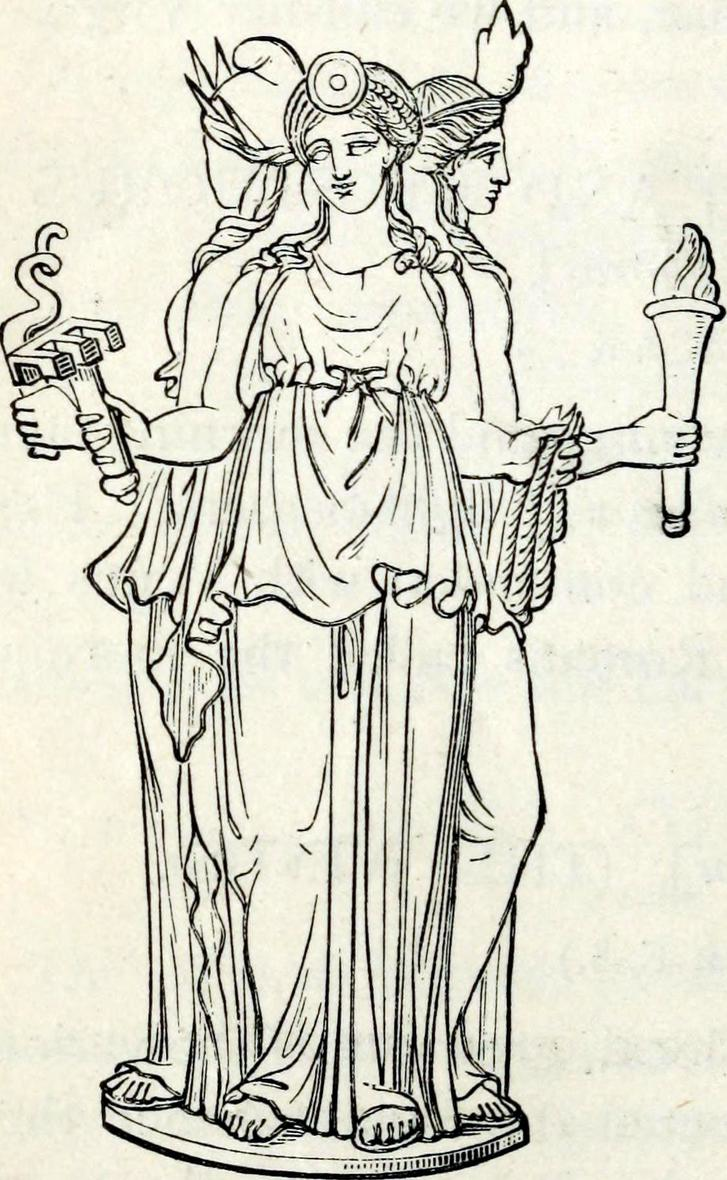
Hecate, the ancient Greek goddess of magic

The English word magic has its origins in ancient Greece. During the late sixth and early fifth centuries BCE, the Persian maguš was Graecicized and introduced into the ancient Greek language as μάγος and μαγεία. In doing so it transformed meaning, gaining negative connotations, with the magos being regarded as a charlatan whose ritual practices were fraudulent, strange, unconventional, and dangerous. As noted by Davies, for the ancient Greeks—and subsequently for the ancient Romans—"magic was not distinct from religion but rather an unwelcome, improper expression of it—the religion of the other". The historian Richard Gordon suggested that for the ancient Greeks, being accused of practicing magic was "a form of insult".

This change in meaning was influenced by the military conflicts that the Greek city-states were then engaged in against the Persian Empire. In this context, the term makes appearances in such surviving text as Sophocles' Oedipus Rex, Hippocrates' De morbo sacro, and Gorgias' Encomium of Helen. In Sophocles' play, for example, the character Oedipus derogatorily refers to the seer Tiresius as a magos—in this context meaning something akin to quack or charlatan—reflecting how this epithet was no longer reserved only for Persians.

In the first century BCE, the Greek concept of the magos was adopted into Latin and used by a number of ancient Roman writers as magus and magia. The earliest known Latin use of the term was in Virgil's Eclogue, written around 40 BCE, which makes reference to magicis... sacris (magic rites). The Romans already had other terms for the negative use of supernatural powers, such as veneficus and saga. The Roman use of the term was similar to that of the Greeks, but placed greater emphasis on the judicial application of it. Within the Roman Empire, laws would be introduced criminalising things regarded as magic.

In ancient Roman society, magic was associated with societies to the east of the empire; the first century CE writer Pliny the Elder for instance claimed that magic had been created by the Iranian philosopher Zoroaster, and that it had then been brought west into Greece by the magician Osthanes, who accompanied the military campaigns of the Persian King Xerxes.

Ancient Greek scholarship of the 20th century, almost certainly influenced by Christianising preconceptions of the meanings of magic and religion, and the wish to establish Greek culture as the foundation of Western rationality, developed a theory of ancient Greek magic as primitive and insignificant, and thereby essentially separate from Homeric, communal (polis) religion. Since the last decade of the century, however, recognising the ubiquity and respectability of acts such as katadesmoi (binding spells), described as magic by modern and ancient observers alike, scholars have been compelled to abandon this viewpoint. The Greek word mageuo (practice magic) itself derives from the word Magos, originally simply the Greek name for a Persian tribe known for practicing religion. Non-civic mystery cults have been similarly re-evaluated:

the choices which lay outside the range of cults did not just add additional options to the civic menu, but ... sometimes incorporated critiques of the civic cults and Panhellenic myths or were genuine alternatives to them.

— Simon Price, Religions of the Ancient Greeks (1999)

Katadesmoi (Latin: defixiones), curses inscribed on wax or lead tablets and buried underground, were frequently executed by all strata of Greek society, sometimes to protect the entire polis. Communal curses carried out in public declined after the Greek classical period, but private curses remained common throughout antiquity. They were distinguished as magical by their individualistic, instrumental and sinister qualities. These qualities, and their perceived deviation from inherently mutable cultural constructs of normality, most clearly delineate ancient magic from the religious rituals of which they form a part.

A large number of magical papyri, in Greek, Coptic, and Demotic, have been recovered and translated. They contain early instances of:

- the use of magic words said to have the power to command spirits;
- the use of mysterious symbols or sigils which are thought to be useful when invoking or evoking spirits.

The practice of magic was banned in the late Roman world, and the Codex Theodosianus (438 AD) states:

If any wizard therefore or person imbued with magical contamination who is called by custom of the people a magician...should be apprehended in my retinue, or in that of the Caesar, he shall not escape punishment and torture by the protection of his rank.

== Middle Ages ==
In the first century CE, early Christian authors absorbed the Greco-Roman concept of magic and incorporated it into their developing Christian theology. These Christians retained the already implied Greco-Roman negative stereotypes of the term and extended them by incorporating conceptual patterns borrowed from Jewish thought, in particular the opposition of magic and miracle. Some early Christian authors followed the Greek-Roman thinking by ascribing the origin of magic to the human realm, mainly to Zoroaster and Osthanes. The Christian view was that magic was a product of the Babylonians, Persians, or Egyptians. The Christians shared with earlier classical culture the idea that magic was something distinct from proper religion, although drew their distinction between the two in different ways.

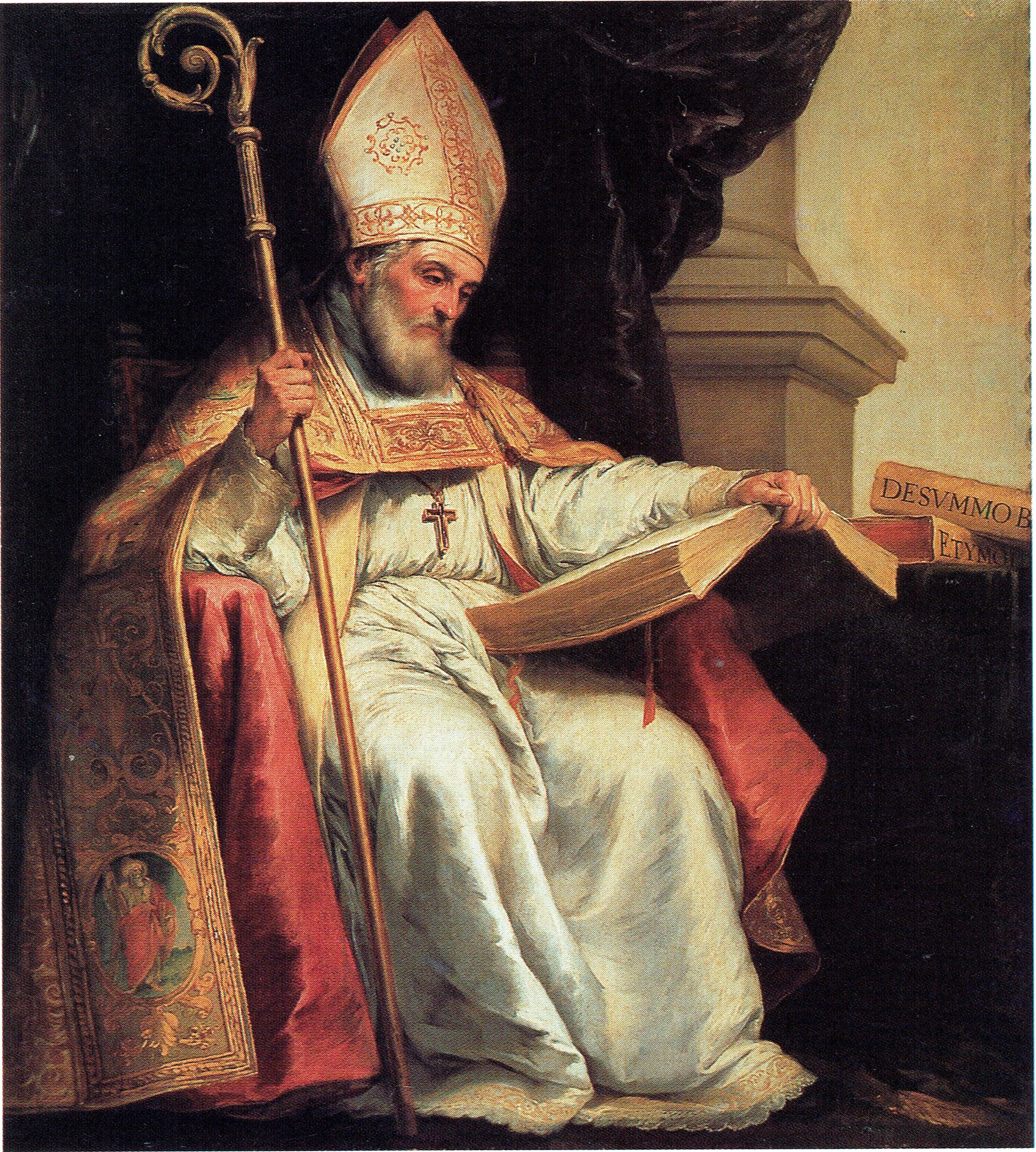
A 17th-century depiction of the medieval writer Isidore of Seville, who provided a list of activities he regarded as magical

For early Christian writers like Augustine of Hippo, magic did not merely constitute fraudulent and unsanctioned ritual practices, but was the very opposite of religion because it relied upon cooperation from demons, the henchmen of Satan. In this, Christian ideas of magic were closely linked to the Christian category of paganism, and both magic and paganism were regarded as belonging under the broader category of superstitio (superstition), another term borrowed from pre-Christian Roman culture. This Christian emphasis on the inherent immorality and wrongness of magic as something conflicting with good religion was far starker than the approach in the other large monotheistic religions of the period, Judaism and Islam. For instance, while Christians regarded demons as inherently evil, the jinn—comparable entities in Islamic mythology—were perceived as more ambivalent figures by Muslims.

The model of the magician in Christian thought was provided by Simon Magus, (Simon the Magician), a figure who opposed Saint Peter in both the Acts of the Apostles and the apocryphal yet influential Acts of Peter. The historian Michael D. Bailey stated that in medieval Europe, magic was a "relatively broad and encompassing category". Christian theologians believed that there were multiple different forms of magic, the majority of which were types of divination, for instance, Isidore of Seville produced a catalogue of things he regarded as magic in which he listed divination by the four elements i.e. geomancy, hydromancy, aeromancy, and pyromancy, as well as by observation of natural phenomena e.g. the flight of birds and astrology. He also mentioned enchantment and ligatures (the medical use of magical objects bound to the patient) as being magical. Medieval Europe also saw magic come to be associated with the Old Testament figure of Solomon; various grimoires, or books outlining magical practices, were written that claimed to have been written by Solomon, most notably the Key of Solomon.

In early medieval Europe, magia was a term of condemnation. In medieval Europe, Christians often suspected Muslims and Jews of engaging in magical practices; in certain cases, these perceived magical rites—including the alleged Jewish sacrifice of Christian children—resulted in Christians massacring these religious minorities. Christian groups often also accused other, rival Christian groups—which they regarded as heretical—of engaging in magical activities. Medieval Europe also saw the term maleficium applied to forms of magic that were conducted with the intention of causing harm. The later Middle Ages saw words for these practitioners of harmful magical acts appear in various European languages: sorcière in French, Hexe in German, strega in Italian, and bruja in Spanish. The English term for malevolent practitioners of magic, witch, derived from the earlier Old English term wicce.

Ars Magica or magic is a major component and supporting contribution to the belief and practice of spiritual, and in many cases, physical healing throughout the Middle Ages. Emanating from many modern interpretations lies a trail of misconceptions about magic, one of the largest revolving around wickedness or the existence of nefarious beings who practice it. These misinterpretations stem from numerous acts or rituals that have been performed throughout antiquity, and due to their exoticism from the commoner's perspective, the rituals invoked uneasiness and an even stronger sense of dismissal.

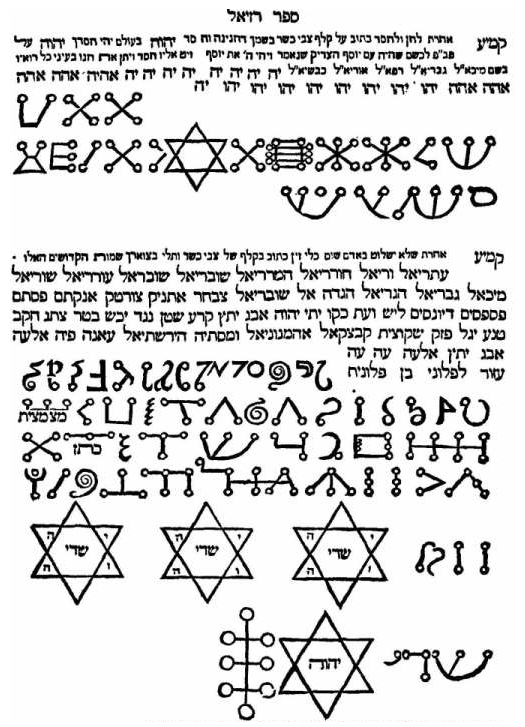
An excerpt from Sefer Raziel HaMalakh, featuring various magical sigils (סגולות segulot in Hebrew)

In the medieval Jewish view, the separation of the mystical and magical elements of Kabbalah, dividing it into speculative theological Kabbalah (Kabbalah Iyyunit) with its meditative traditions, and theurgic practical Kabbalah (Kabbalah Ma'asit), had occurred by the beginning of the 14th century.

One societal force in the Middle Ages more powerful than the singular commoner, the Christian Church, rejected magic as a whole because it was viewed as a means of tampering with the natural world in a supernatural manner associated with the biblical verses of Deuteronomy 18:9–12. Despite the many negative connotations which surround the term magic, there exist many elements that are seen in a divine or holy light.

Diversified instruments or rituals used in medieval magic include, but are not limited to: various amulets, talismans, potions, as well as specific chants, dances, and prayers. Along with these rituals are the adversely imbued notions of demonic participation which influence of them. The idea that magic was devised, taught, and worked by demons would have seemed reasonable to anyone who read the Greek magical papyri or the Sefer-ha-Razim and found that healing magic appeared alongside rituals for killing people, gaining wealth, or personal advantage, and coercing women into sexual submission. Archaeology is contributing to a fuller understanding of ritual practices performed in the home, on the body and in monastic and church settings.

The Islamic reaction towards magic did not condemn magic in general and distinguished between magic which can heal sickness and possession, and sorcery. The former is therefore a special gift from God, while the latter is achieved through help of Jinn and devils. Ibn al-Nadim held that exorcists gain their power by their obedience to God, while sorcerers please the devils by acts of disobedience and sacrifices and they in return do him a favor. According to Ibn Arabi, Al-Ḥajjāj ibn Yusuf al-Shubarbuli was able to walk on water due to his piety. According to the Quran 2:102, magic was also taught to humans by devils and the fallen angels Harut and Marut.

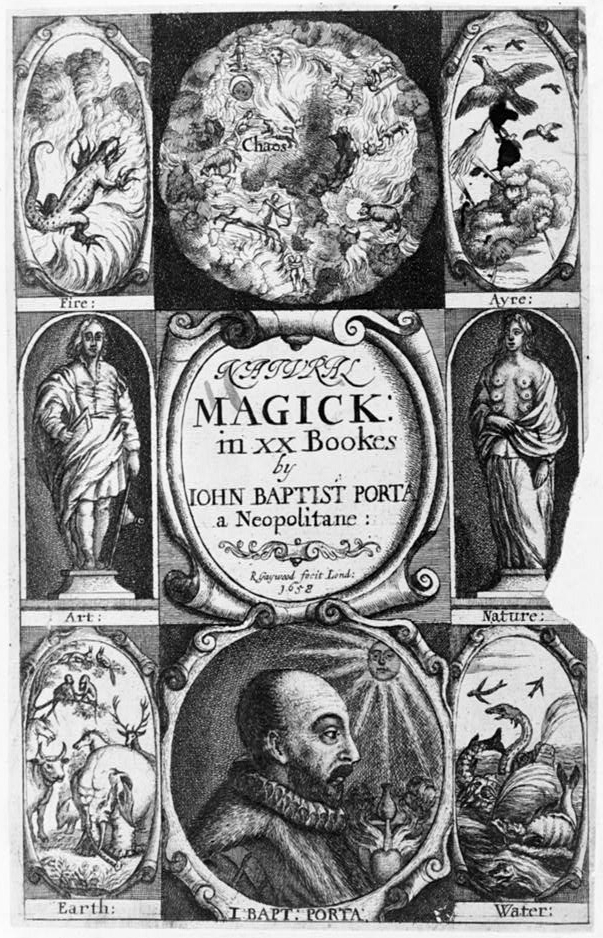
Frontispiece of an English translation of Natural Magick published in London in 1658

During the early modern period, the concept of magic underwent a more positive reassessment through the development of the concept of magia naturalis (natural magic). This was a term introduced and developed by two Italian humanists, Marsilio Ficino and Giovanni Pico della Mirandola. For them, magia was viewed as an elemental force pervading many natural processes, and thus was fundamentally distinct from the mainstream Christian idea of demonic magic. Their ideas influenced an array of later philosophers and writers, among them Paracelsus, Giordano Bruno, Johannes Reuchlin, and Johannes Trithemius. According to the historian Richard Kieckhefer, the concept of magia naturalis took "firm hold in European culture" during the fourteenth and fifteenth centuries, attracting the interest of natural philosophers of various theoretical orientations, including Aristotelians, Neoplatonists, and Hermeticists.

Adherents of this position argued that magia could appear in both good and bad forms; in 1625, the French librarian Gabriel Naudé wrote his Apology for all the Wise Men Falsely Suspected of Magic, in which he distinguished "Mosoaicall Magick"—which he claimed came from God and included prophecies, miracles, and speaking in tongues—from "geotick" magic caused by demons. While the proponents of magia naturalis insisted that this did not rely on the actions of demons, critics disagreed, arguing that the demons had simply deceived these magicians. By the seventeenth century the concept of magia naturalis had moved in increasingly 'naturalistic' directions, with the distinctions between it and science becoming blurred. The validity of magia naturalis as a concept for understanding the universe then came under increasing criticism during the Age of Enlightenment in the eighteenth century.

Despite the attempt to reclaim the term magia for use in a positive sense, it did not supplant traditional attitudes toward magic in the West, which remained largely negative. At the same time as magia naturalis was attracting interest and was largely tolerated, Europe saw an active persecution of accused witches believed to be guilty of maleficia. Reflecting the term's continued negative associations, Protestants often sought to denigrate Roman Catholic sacramental and devotional practices as being magical rather than religious. Many Roman Catholics were concerned by this allegation and for several centuries various Roman Catholic writers devoted attention to arguing that their practices were religious rather than magical. At the same time, Protestants often used the accusation of magic against other Protestant groups which they were in contest with. In this way, the concept of magic was used to prescribe what was appropriate as religious belief and practice. Similar claims were also being made in the Islamic world during this period. The Arabian cleric Muhammad ibn Abd al-Wahhab—founder of Wahhabism—for instance condemned a range of customs and practices such as divination and the veneration of spirits as sihr, which he in turn claimed was a form of shirk, the sin of idolatry.

=== Witchcraft in medieval Europe ===
In the early Middle Ages, there were those who both spoke against witchcraft, and those who spoke against accusing others of witchcraft (at all). For example, the Pactus Legis Alamannorum, an early 7th-century code of laws of the Alemanni confederation of Germanic tribes, lists witchcraft as a punishable crime on equal terms with poisoning. If a free man accuses a free woman of witchcraft or poisoning, the accused may be disculpated either by twelve people swearing an oath on her innocence or by one of her relatives defending her in a trial by combat. In this case, the accuser is required to pay a fine (Pactus Legis Alamannorum 13). In contrast, Charlemagne prescribed the death penalty for anyone who would burn witches, as seen when he imposed Christianity upon the people of Saxony in 789 and he proclaimed:

If anyone, deceived by the Devil, shall believe, as is customary among pagans, that any man or woman is a night-witch, and eats men, and on that account burn that person to death... he shall be executed.

Similarly, the Lombard code of 643 states:

Let nobody presume to kill a foreign serving maid or female slave as a witch, for it is not possible, nor ought to be believed by Christian minds.

This conforms to the thoughts of Saint Augustine of Hippo, who taught that witchcraft did not exist and that the belief in it was heretical.

In the Late Middle Ages, witch trials started becoming more accepted if the accusations of witchcraft were related to heresy. However, accusations of witchcraft could be for political reasons too, such as in 1425 when Veronika of Desenice was accused of witchcraft and murdered even though she was acquitted by a court because her father-in-law did not want her to marry his son. The trial of Joan of Arc in 1431 may be the most famous witch trial of the Middle Ages and can be seen as the beginning of the witch trials of the early modern era. A young woman who led France to victory during the Hundred Years' War, she was sold to the English and accused of heresy because she believed God had designated her to defend her country from invasion. While her capture was initially political, the trial quickly turned to focusing on her claims of divine guidance, leading to heresy and witchcraft being the main focus of her trial. She was given the choice to renounce her divine visions and to stop wearing soldier's clothing, or to be put to death. She renounced her visions and stopped wearing soldier's clothing, but only for four days. Since she again had professed her belief in divine guidance and began wearing men's clothes, she was convicted of heresy and burnt alive at the stake—a punishment that at the time was felt only necessary for witches.

== Renaissance practitioners ==
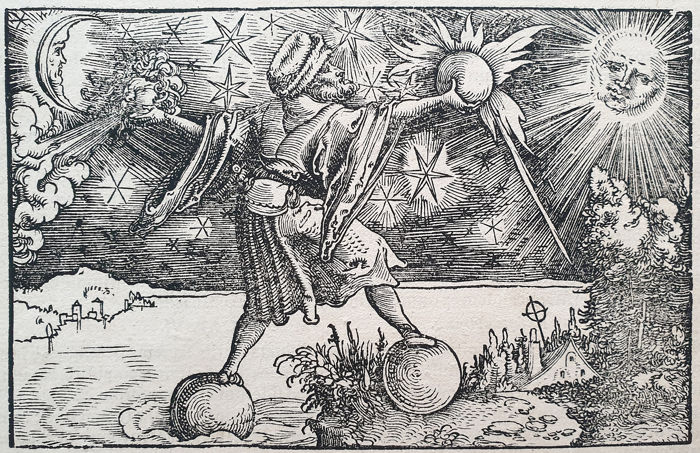
Woodcut illustration from an edition of Pliny the Elder's Naturalis Historia (1582)

The term "Renaissance magic" originates in 16th-century Renaissance magic, referring to practices described in various medieval and Renaissance grimoires and in collections such as that of Johannes Hartlieb. Georg Pictor uses the term synonymously with goetia.

James Sanford in his 1569 translation of Heinrich Cornelius Agrippa's 1526 De incertitudine et vanitate scientiarum has "The partes of ceremoniall Magicke be Geocie, and Theurgie". For Agrippa, ceremonial magic was in opposition to natural magic. While he had his misgivings about natural magic, which included astrology, alchemy, and also what we would today consider fields of natural science, such as botany, he was nevertheless prepared to accept it as "the highest peak of natural philosophy". Ceremonial magic, on the other hand, which included all sorts of communication with spirits, including necromancy and witchcraft, he denounced in its entirety as impious disobedience towards God.

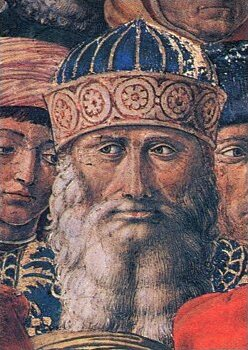
Portrait of Gemistus Pletho, detail of a fresco by acquaintance Benozzo Gozzoli, Palazzo Medici Riccardi, Florence, Italy

Both bourgeoisie and nobility in the 15th and 16th centuries showed great fascination with the seven artes magicae, which exerted an exotic charm by their ascription to Arabic, Jewish, Romani, and Egyptian sources. There was great uncertainty in distinguishing practices of vain superstition, blasphemous occultism, and perfectly sound scholarly knowledge or pious ritual. Intellectual and spiritual tensions erupted in the Early Modern witch craze, further reinforced by the turmoils of the Protestant Reformation, especially in Germany, England, and Scotland. The people during this time found that the existence of magic was something that could answer the questions that they could not explain through science. To them it was suggesting that while science may explain reason, magic could explain "unreason".

Renaissance humanism saw a resurgence in hermeticism and Neo-Platonic varieties of ceremonial magic. The Renaissance, on the other hand, saw the rise of science, in such forms as the dethronement of the Ptolemaic theory of the universe, the distinction of astronomy from astrology, and of chemistry from alchemy.

In Hasidism, the displacement of practical Kabbalah using directly magical means, by conceptual and meditative trends gained much further emphasis, while simultaneously instituting meditative theurgy for material blessings at the heart of its social mysticism. Hasidism internalised Kabbalah through the psychology of deveikut (cleaving to God), and cleaving to the Tzadik (Hasidic Rebbe). In Hasidic doctrine, the tzaddik channels Divine spiritual and physical bounty to his followers by altering the Will of God (uncovering a deeper concealed Will) through his own deveikut and self-nullification. Dov Ber of Mezeritch is concerned to distinguish this theory of the Tzadik's will altering and deciding the Divine Will, from directly magical process.

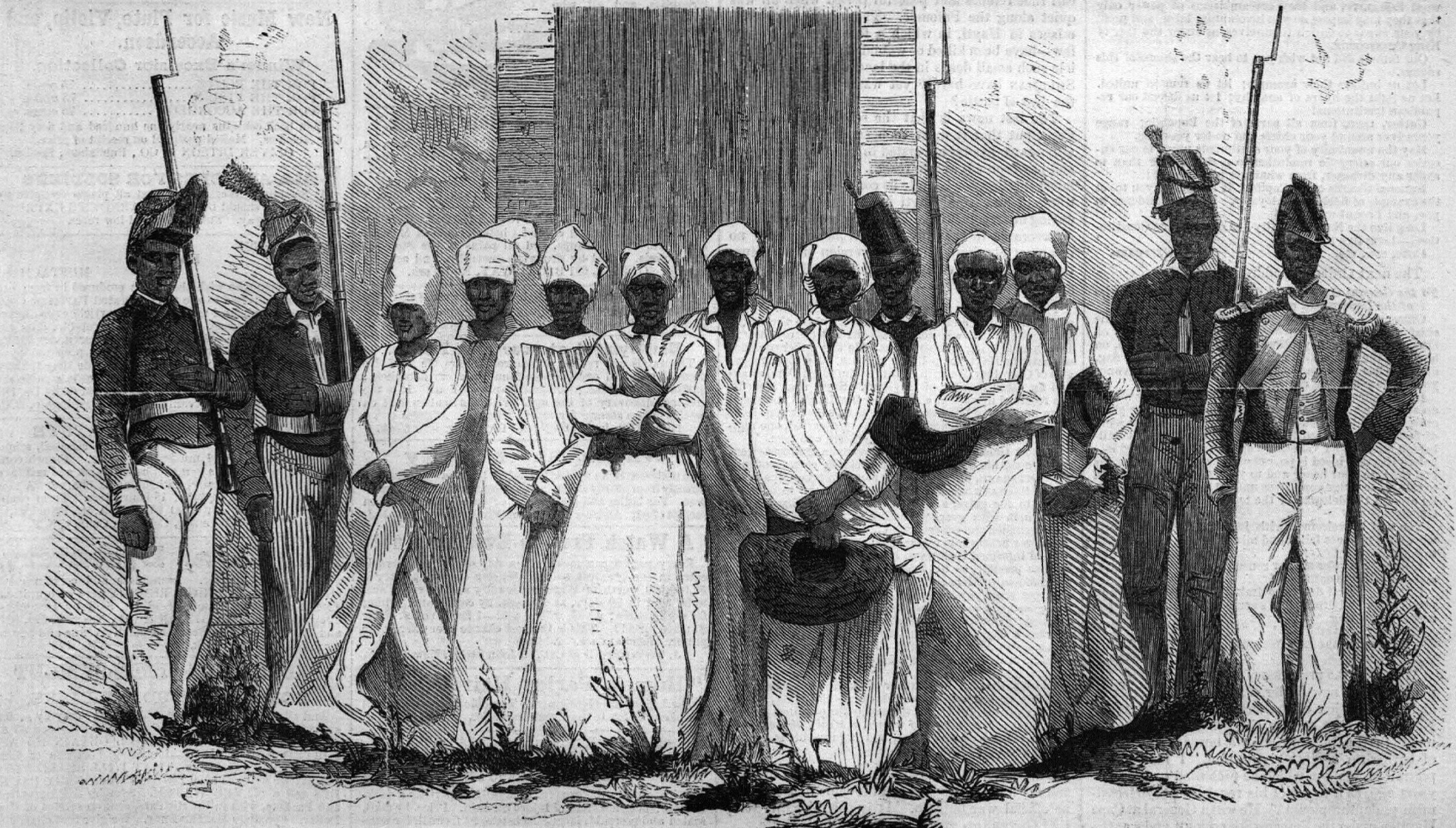
In the nineteenth century, the Haitian government began to legislate against Vodou, describing it as a form of witchcraft; this conflicted with Vodou practitioners' own understanding of their religion.

In the sixteenth century, European societies began to conquer and colonise other continents around the world, and as they did so they applied European concepts of magic and witchcraft to practices found among the peoples whom they encountered. Usually, these European colonialists regarded the natives as primitives and savages whose belief systems were diabolical and needed to be eradicated and replaced by Christianity. Because Europeans typically viewed these non-European peoples as being morally and intellectually inferior to themselves, it was expected that such societies would be more prone to practicing magic. Women who practiced traditional rites were labelled as witches by the Europeans.

In various cases, these imported European concepts and terms underwent new transformations as they merged with indigenous concepts. In West Africa, for instance, Portuguese travellers introduced their term and concept of the feitiçaria (often translated as sorcery) and the feitiço (spell) to the native population, where it was transformed into the concept of the fetish. When later Europeans encountered these West African societies, they wrongly believed that the fetiche was an indigenous African term rather than the result of earlier inter-continental encounters. Sometimes, colonised populations themselves adopted these European concepts for their own purposes. In the early nineteenth century, the newly independent Haitian government of Jean-Jacques Dessalines began to suppress the practice of Vodou, and in 1835 Haitian law-codes categorised all Vodou practices as sortilège (sorcery/witchcraft), suggesting that it was all conducted with harmful intent, whereas among Vodou practitioners the performance of harmful rites was already given a separate and distinct category, known as maji.

=== Late Middle Ages to early Renaissance ===
==== Georgius Gemistus Pletho ====
Georgius Gemistus Pletho (c. 1355/1360 – 1452/1454) was a Greek scholar and one of the most renowned philosophers of the late Byzantine era. He was a chief pioneer of the revival of Greek scholarship in Western Europe. As revealed in his last literary work, the Nomoi or Book of Laws, which he only circulated among close friends, he rejected Christianity in favour of a return to the worship of the classical Hellenic Gods, mixed with ancient wisdom based on Zoroaster and the Magi. Plethon may also have been the source for Ficino's Orphic system of natural magic.

==== Marsilio Ficino ====
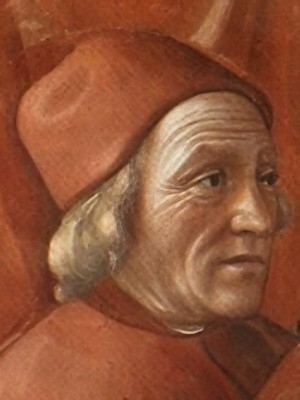
Marsilio Ficino from a fresco painted by Domenico Ghirlandaio in the Tornabuoni Chapel, Santa Maria Novella, Florence

Marsilio Ficino (1433–1499) was an Italian scholar and Catholic priest who was one of the most influential humanist philosophers of the early Italian Renaissance. He was an astrologer, a reviver of Neoplatonism in touch with the major academics of his day, and the first translator of Plato's complete extant works into Latin. His Florentine Academy, an attempt to revive Plato's Academy, influenced the direction and tenor of the Italian Renaissance and the development of European philosophy.

Ficino's letters, extending over the years 1474–1494, survive and have been published. He wrote De amore (Of Love) in 1484. De vita libri tres (Three books on life), or De triplici vita (The Book of Life), published in 1489, provides a great deal of medical and astrological advice for maintaining health and vigor, as well as espousing the Neoplatonist view of the world's ensoulment and its integration with the human soul:

There will be some men or other, superstitious and blind, who see life plain in even the lowest animals and the meanest plants, but do not see life in the heavens or the world ... Now if those little men grant life to the smallest particles of the world, what folly! what envy! neither to know that the Whole, in which 'we live and move and have our being,' is itself alive, nor to wish this to be so.

One metaphor for this integrated "aliveness" is Ficino's astrology. In the Book of Life, he details the interlinks between behavior and consequence. It talks about a list of things that hold sway over a man's destiny.

His medical works exerted considerable influence on Renaissance physicians such as Paracelsus, with whom he shared the perception on the unity of the micro- and macrocosmos, and their interactions, through somatic and psychological manifestations, with the aim to investigate their signatures to cure diseases. Those works, which were very popular at the time, dealt with astrological and alchemical concepts. Thus Ficino came under the suspicion of heresy; especially after the publication of the third book in 1489, which contained specific instructions on healthful living in a world of demons and other spirits.

==== Giovanni Pico della Mirandola ====
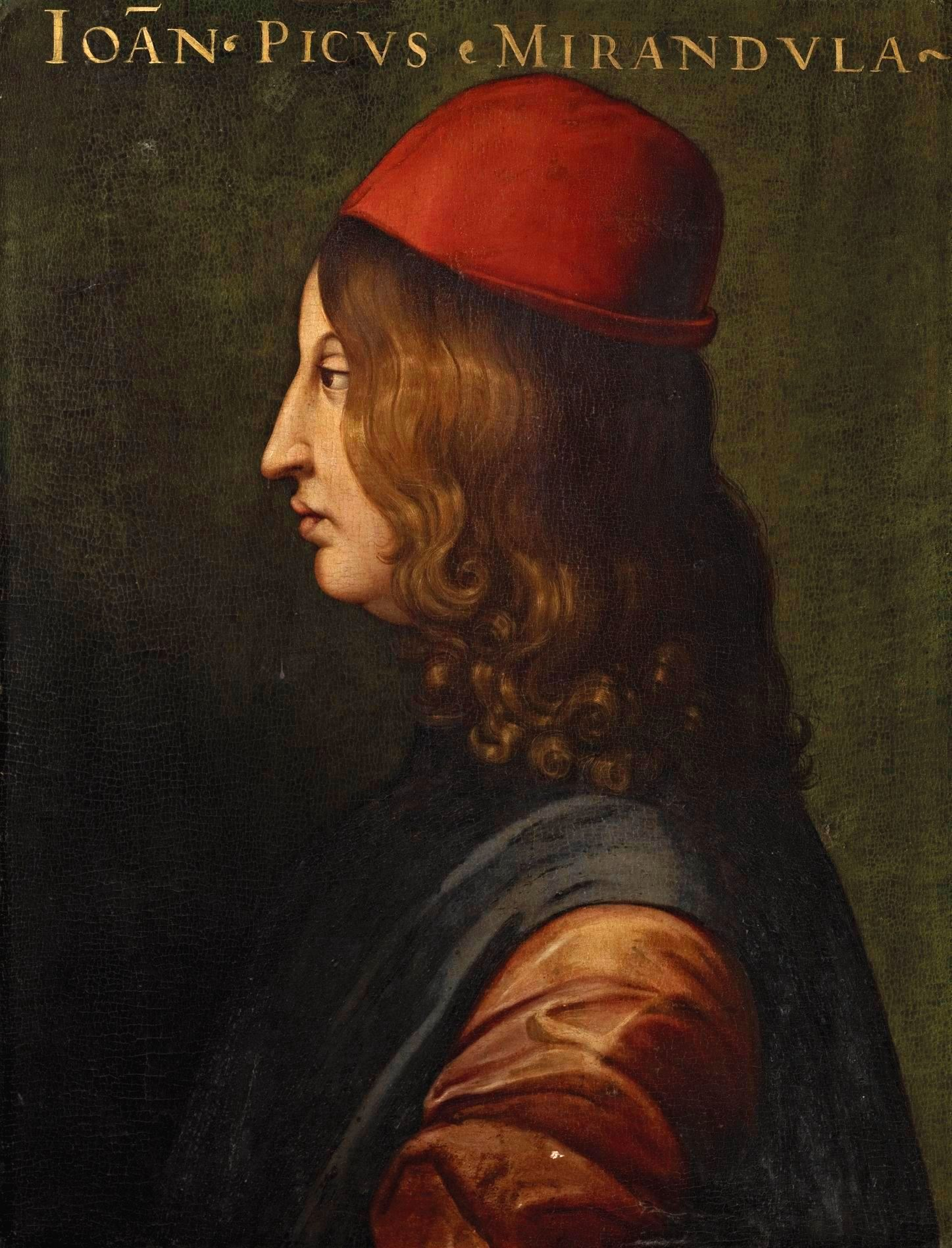
Portrait from the Uffizi Gallery, in Florence

Giovanni Pico della Mirandola (1463–1494) was an Italian Renaissance nobleman and philosopher. He is famed for the events of 1486, when, at the age of 23, he proposed to defend 900 theses on religion, philosophy, natural philosophy, and magic against all comers, for which he wrote the Oration on the Dignity of Man, which has been called the "Manifesto of the Renaissance", and a key text of Renaissance humanism and of what has been called the "Hermetic Reformation". He was the founder of the tradition of Christian Kabbalah, a key element of early modern Western esotericism. The 900 Theses was the first printed book to be universally banned by the Church.

In November 1484, he settled for a time in Florence and met Lorenzo de' Medici and Marsilio Ficino. It was an astrologically auspicious day that Ficino had chosen to publish his translations of the works of Plato from Greek into Latin, under Lorenzo's enthusiastic patronage. Pico appears to have charmed both men, and despite Ficino's philosophical differences, he was convinced of their Saturnine affinity and the divine providence of his arrival. Lorenzo would support and protect Pico until his death in 1492.

Pico spent several months in Perugia and nearby Fratta. It was there, as he wrote to Ficino, that "divine Providence ... caused certain books to fall into my hands. They are Chaldean books ... of Esdras, of Zoroaster and of Melchior, oracles of the magi, which contain a brief and dry interpretation of Chaldean philosophy, but full of mystery." It was also in Perugia that Pico was introduced to the mystical Hebrew Kabbalah, which fascinated him, as did the late classical Hermetic writers, such as Hermes Trismegistus. The Kabbalah and Hermetica were thought in Pico's time to be as ancient as the Old Testament.

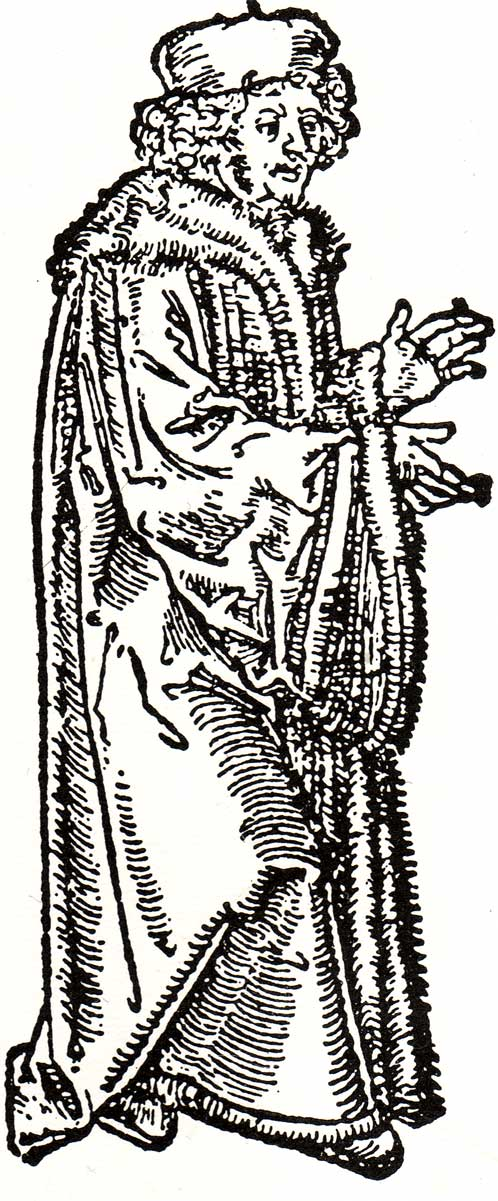
Johann Reuchlin, woodcut depiction from 1516

Pico's tutor in Kabbalah was Rabbi Johannan Alemanno (1435/8–c. 1510), who argued that the study and mastery of magic was to be regarded as the final stage of one's intellectual and spiritual education. This contact, initiated as a result of Christian interest in Jewish mystical sources, resulted in unprecedented mutual influence between Jewish and Christian Renaissance thought. The most original of Pico's 900 theses concerned the Kabbalah. As a result, he became the founder of the tradition known as Christian Kabbalah, which went on to be a central part of early modern Western esotericism.

Pico's approach to different philosophies was one of extreme syncretism, placing them in parallel, it has been claimed, rather than attempting to describe a developmental history. Pico based his ideas chiefly on Plato, as did his teacher, Marsilio Ficino, but retained a deep respect for Aristotle. Although he was a product of the studia humanitatis, Pico was constitutionally an eclectic, and in some respects he represented a reaction against the exaggerations of pure humanism, defending what he believed to be the best of the medieval and Islamic commentators, such as Averroes and Avicenna, on Aristotle in a famous long letter to Ermolao Barbaro in 1485.

It was always Pico's aim to reconcile the schools of Plato and Aristotle since he believed they used different words to express the same concepts. It was perhaps for this reason his friends called him "Princeps Concordiae", or "Prince of Harmony" (a pun on Prince of Concordia, one of his family's holdings). Similarly, Pico believed that an educated person should also study Hebrew and Talmudic sources, and the Hermetics, because he thought they represented the same concept of God that is seen in the Old Testament, but in different words.

In 1490 Pico met with Johannes Reuchlin (1455–1522), who became heir to his Kabbalistic doctrines. Following Pico, Reuchlin seemed to find in the Kabbala a profound theosophy which might be of the greatest service for the defence of Christianity and the reconciliation of science with the mysteries of faith, a common notion at that time. Reuchlin's mystico-cabalistic ideas and objects were expounded in the De Verbo Mirifico, and finally in the De Arte Cabalistica (1517).

==== The legendary Doctor Faustus ====
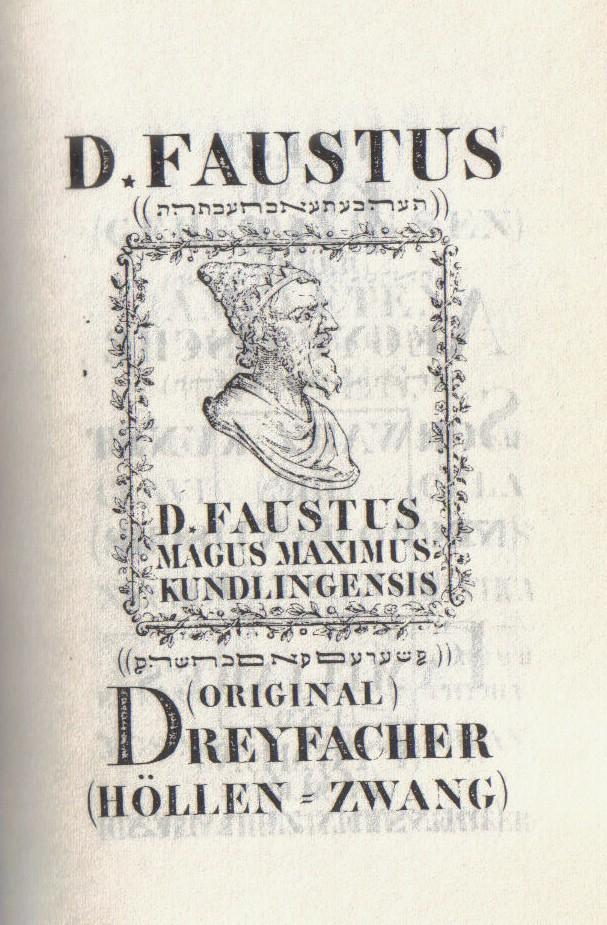
Title page of one of the Höllenzwang grimoires attributed to D. Faustus Magus Maximus Kundlingensis (18th century)

Johann Georg Faust (c. 1480 or 1466 – c. 1541) was a German itinerant alchemist, astrologer and magician of the German Renaissance. Because of his early treatment as a figure in legend and literature, it is difficult to establish historical facts about his life with any certainty.

For the year 1506, there is a record of Faust appearing as performer of magical tricks and horoscopes in Gelnhausen. Over the following 30 years, there are numerous similar records spread over southern Germany. Faust appeared as physician, doctor of philosophy, alchemist, magician and astrologer, and was often accused as a fraud. The church denounced him as a blasphemer in league with the devil.

On 23 February 1520, Faust was in Bamberg, doing a horoscope for the bishop and the town, for which he received the sum of 10 gulden. In 1528, Faust visited Ingolstadt, whence he was banished shortly after.

In 1532 he seems to have tried to enter Nürnberg, according to an unflattering note made by the junior mayor of the city to "deny free passage to the great nigromancer and sodomite Doctor Faustus" (Doctor Faustus, dem großen Sodomiten und Nigromantico in furt glait ablainen). Later records give a more positive verdict; thus the Tübingen professor Joachim Camerarius in 1536 recognises Faust as a respectable astrologer, and physician Philipp Begardi of Worms in 1539 praises his medical knowledge. The last direct attestation of Faust dates to 25 June 1535, when his presence was recorded in Münster during the Anabaptist rebellion.

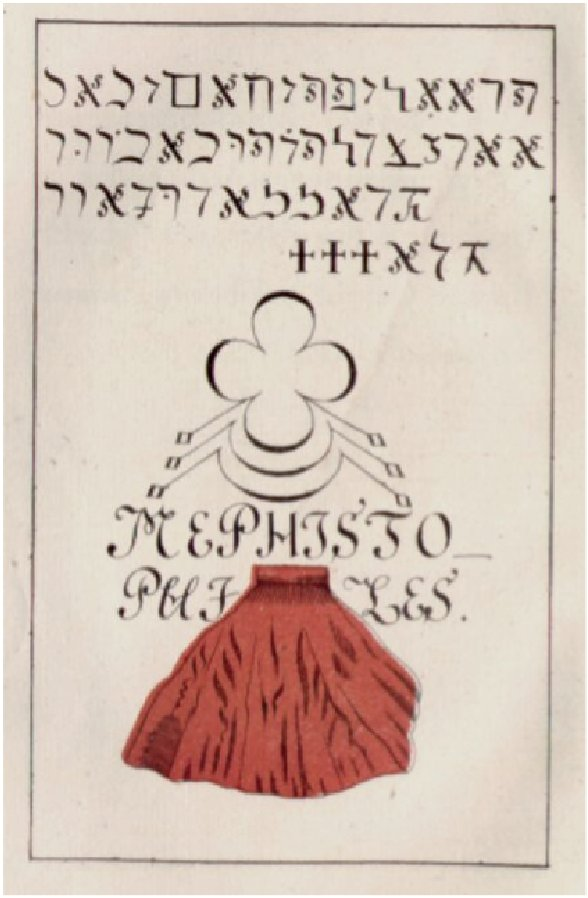
Page of Praxis Magia Faustiana (1527)

Doctor Faust became the subject of folk legend in the decades after his death, transmitted in chapbooks beginning in the 1580s, and was notably adapted by Christopher Marlowe in his play The Tragical History of the Life and Death of Doctor Faustus (1604). The Faustbuch tradition survived throughout the early modern period, and the legend was again adapted in Johann Wolfgang von Goethe's closet drama Faust (1808), Hector Berlioz's musical composition La damnation de Faust (premiered 1846), and Franz Liszt's Faust Symphony of 1857.

There are several prints of grimoires or magical texts attributed to Faust. Some of them are artificially dated to his lifetime, either to "1540", or to "1501", "1510", etc., some even to unreasonably early dates, such as "1405" and "1469". The prints in fact date to the late 16th century, from ca. 1580, i.e. the same period of the development of the Volksbuch tradition. (Note: Engel (1885) is aware of fifteen prints (nos. 335–349, pp. 154–157) dated between 1501 and 1540. Engel's no. 334 (Dr. Johann Faustus Miracul- Kunst- und Wunder-Buch, reprinted in Kloster vol. 2, 852–897) is dated MCDXXXXXXIX, i.e. 1469.)

==== Other early writers ====
Other writers on occult or magical topics during this period include:

- Johannes Hartlieb (1410–1468) wrote a compendium on herbs in ca. 1440, and in 1456 the puch aller verpoten kunst, ungelaubens und der zaubrey (book on all forbidden arts, superstition and sorcery) on the artes magicae, containing the oldest known description of witches' flying ointment.
- Thomas Norton (b. <1436 – d. c. 1513) was an English poet and alchemist best known for his 1477 alchemical poem, The Ordinal of Alchemy.
- Johannes Trithemius (1462–1516) Trithemius' most famous work, Steganographia (written c. 1499; published Frankfurt, 1606), was placed on the Index Librorum Prohibitorum in 1609 and removed in 1900. This book is in three volumes, and appears to be about magic—specifically, about using spirits to communicate over long distances. However, since the publication of a decryption key to the first two volumes in 1606, they have been known to be actually concerned with cryptography and steganography. Until recently, the third volume was widely still believed to be solely about magic, but the magical formulae have now been shown to be covertexts for yet more material on cryptography.

=== Renaissance and Reformation ===
C. S. Lewis in his 1954 English Literature in the Sixteenth Century, Excluding Drama differentiates what he takes to be the change of character in magic as practiced in the Middle Ages as opposed to the Renaissance:

Only an obstinate prejudice about this period could blind us to a certain change which comes over the merely literary texts as we pass from the Middle Ages to the sixteenth century. In medieval stories there is, in one sense, plenty of “magic”. Merlin does this or that “by his subtilty”, Bercilak resumes his severed head. But all these passages have unmistakably the note of “faerie” about them. But in Spenser, Marlowe, Chapman, and Shakespeare the subject is treated quite differently. “He to his studie goes”; books are opened, terrible words pronounced, souls imperiled. The medieval author seems to write for a public to whom magic, like knight-errantry, is part of the furniture of romance: the Elizabethan, for a public who feel that it might be going on in the next street. [...] Neglect of this point has produced strange readings of The Tempest, which is in reality [...] Shakespeare’s play on magia as Macbeth is his play on goeteia.

==== Heinrich Cornelius Agrippa ====
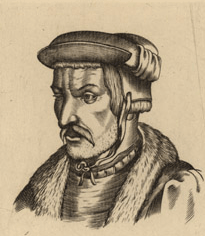
Woodcut print portrait of Agrippa

The Cabalistic and Hermetic magic, which was created by Marsilio Ficino (1433–1499) and Giovanni Pico della Mirandola (1463–1494), was made popular in northern Europe, most notably England, by Heinrich Cornelius Agrippa (1486–1535), via his De occulta philosophia libra tres (1531–1533). Agrippa had revolutionary ideas about magical theory and procedure that were widely circulated in the Renaissance among those who sought out knowledge of occult philosophy.

Agrippa himself was famous as a scholar, physician jurist, and astrologer, but throughout his life he was continually persecuted as a heretic. His problems stemmed not only from his reputation as a conjurer, but also from his vehement criticism of the vices of the ruling classes and of the most respected intellectual and religious authorities.

While some scholars and students viewed Agrippa as a source of intellectual inspiration, to many others, his practices were dubious and his beliefs serious. The transitive side of magic is explored in Agrippa's De occulta philosophia, and at times it is vulgarized. Yet in Ficino and Pico and we never lose sight of magic's solemn religious purposes: the magician explores the secrets of nature so as to arouse wonder at the works of God and to inspire a more ardent worship and love of the Creator.

Considerable space is devoted to examples of evil sorcery in De occulta philosophia, and one might easily come away from the treatise with the impression that Agrippa found witchcraft as intriguing as benevolent magic.

However, at the peak of the witch trials, there was a certain danger to be associated with witchcraft or sorcery, and most learned authors took pains to clearly renounce the practice of forbidden arts. Thus, Agrippa while admitting that natural magic is the highest form of natural philosophy unambiguously rejects all forms of ceremonial magic (goetia or necromancy).

==== Paracelsus ====
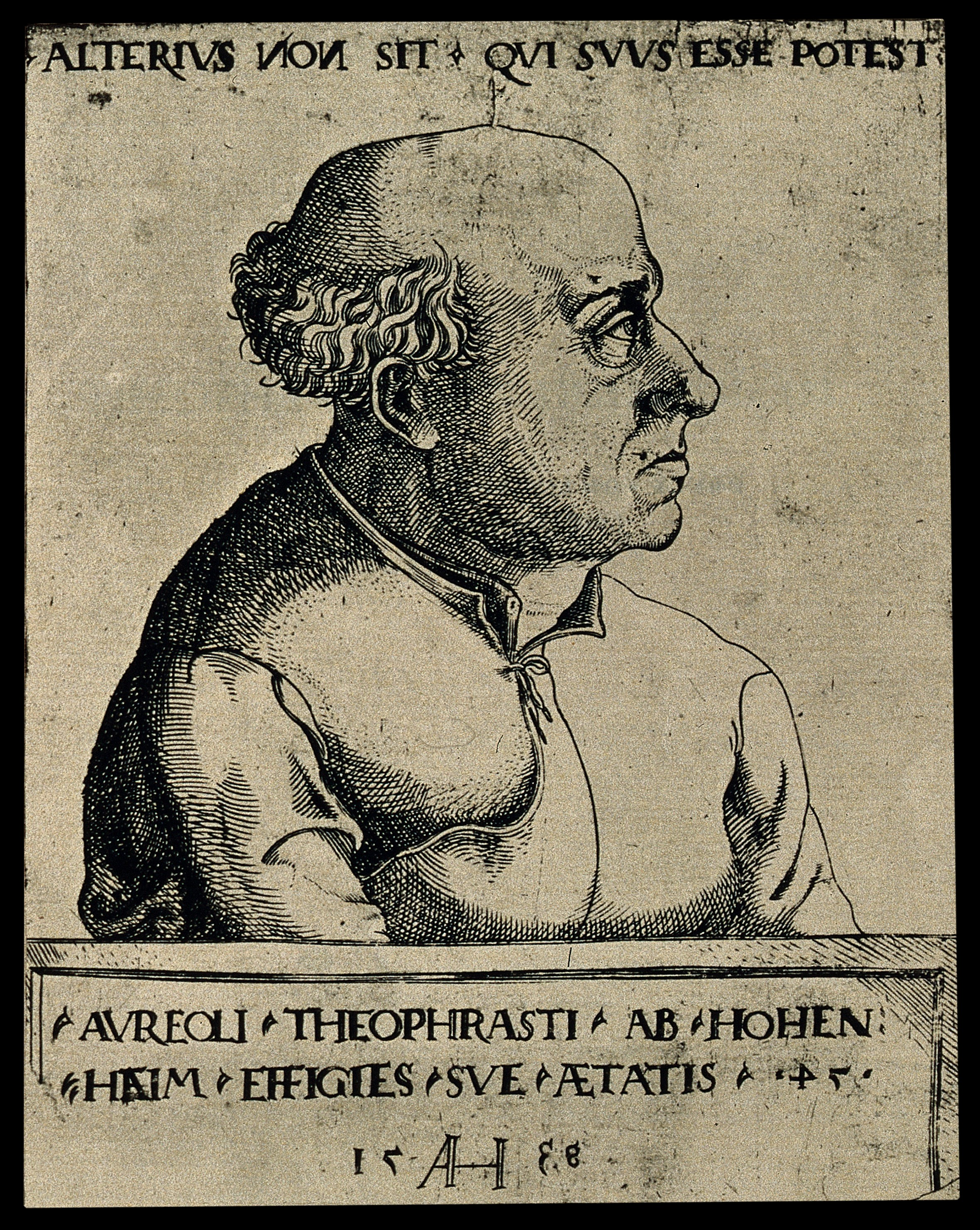
1538 portrait of Paracelsus by Augustin Hirschvogel

Paracelsus (c. 1493 (Note: Pagel (1982), p. 6, citing Bittel (1942), p. 1163, Strebel (1944), p. 38. The most frequently cited assumption that Paracelsus was born in late 1493 is due to Sudhoff (1936), p. 11.)–1541) was a Swiss (Note: Paracelsus self-identifies as Swiss (ich bin von Einsidlen, dess Lands ein Schweizer) in grosse Wundartznei (vol. 1, p. 56) and names Carinthia as his "second fatherland" (das ander mein Vatterland).) physician, alchemist, lay theologian, and philosopher of the German Renaissance. As a physician of the early 16th century, Paracelsus held a natural affinity with the Hermetic, Neoplatonic, and Pythagorean philosophies central to the Renaissance, a world-view exemplified by Marsilio Ficino and Pico della Mirandola.

Astrology was a very important part of Paracelsus's medicine and he was a practising astrologer – as were many of the university-trained physicians working at that time in Europe. Paracelsus devoted several sections in his writings to the construction of astrological talismans for curing disease. He largely rejected the philosophies of Aristotle and Galen, as well as the theory of humours. Although he did accept the concept of the four elements as water, air, fire, and earth, he saw them merely as a foundation for other properties on which to build. Paracelsus also described four elemental beings, each corresponding to one of the four elements: Salamanders, which correspond to fire; Gnomes, corresponding to earth; Undines, corresponding to water; and Sylphs, corresponding to air.

He often viewed fire as the Firmament that sat between air and water in the heavens. Paracelsus often uses an egg to help describe the elements. In his early model, he wrote that air surrounded the world like an egg shell. The egg white below the shell is like fire because it has a type of chaos to it that allows it to hold up earth and water. The earth and water make up a globe which, in terms of the egg, is the yolk. In De Meteoris, Paracelsus wrote that the firmament is the heavens.

==== Nostradamus ====
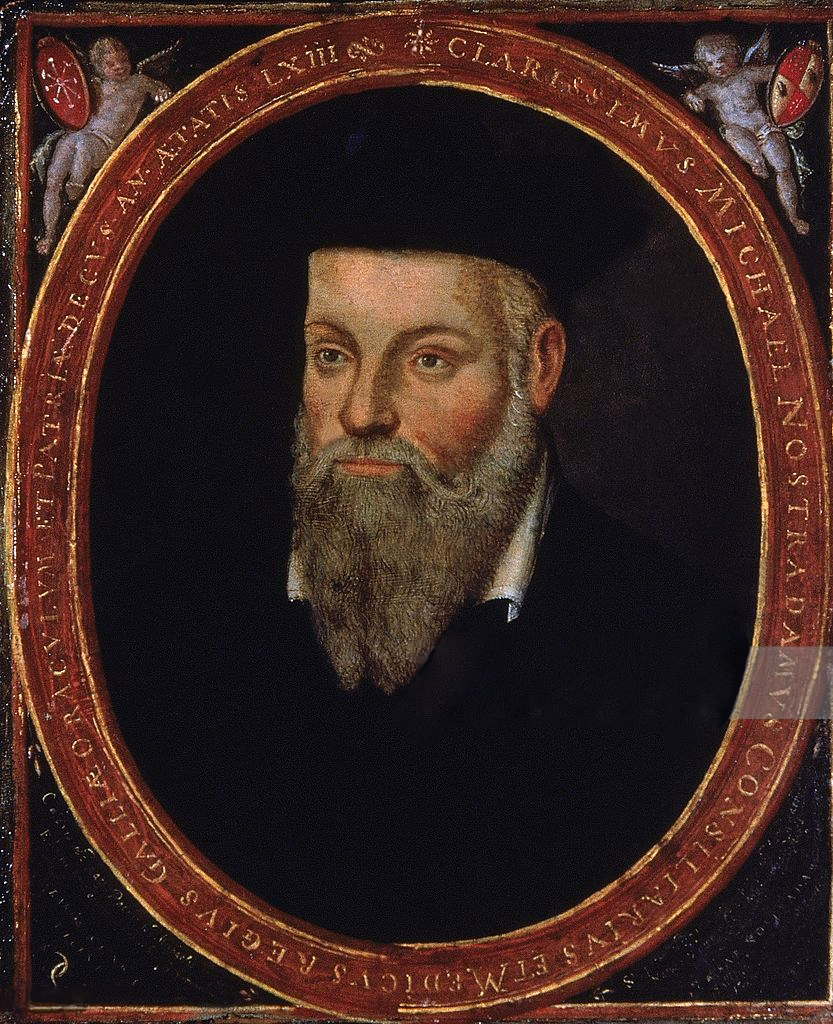
Nostradamus: original portrait by his son Cesar

Nostradamus (1503–1566) was a French astrologer, physician and reputed seer, who is best known for allegedly predicting future events. Following popular trends, he wrote an almanac for 1550, for the first time in print Latinising his name to Nostradamus. He was so encouraged by the almanac's success that he decided to write one or more annually. Taken together, they are known to have contained at least 6,338 prophecies, as well as at least eleven annual calendars, all of them starting on 1 January and not, as is sometimes supposed, in March.

It was mainly in response to the almanacs that the nobility and other prominent persons from far away soon started asking for horoscopes and psychic advice from him, though he generally expected his clients to supply the birth charts on which these would be based, rather than calculating them himself as a professional astrologer would have done. When obliged to attempt this himself on the basis of the published tables of the day, he frequently made errors and failed to adjust the figures for his clients' place or time of birth.

He then began his project of writing his book Les Prophéties, a collection of 942 poetic quatrains (Note: The original edition of Nostradamus's Les Prophéties from 1555 contained only 353 quatrains. More were later added, amounting to 942 in an omnibus edition published after his death organized into ten "Centuries", each one containing one hundred quatrains, except for Century VII, which, for unknown reasons, only contains forty-two; the other fifty-eight may have been lost due to a problem during publication.) which constitute the largely undated prophecies for which he is most famous today. Feeling vulnerable to opposition on religious grounds, however, he devised a method of obscuring his meaning by using "Virgilianised" syntax, word games and a mixture of other languages such as Greek, Italian, Latin, and Provençal. For technical reasons connected with their publication in three instalments (the publisher of the third and last instalment seems to have been unwilling to start it in the middle of a "Century," or book of 100 verses), the last fifty-eight quatrains of the seventh "Century" have not survived in any extant edition.

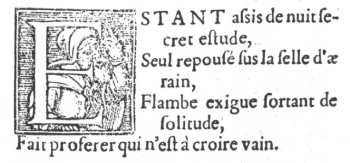
Century I, Quatrain 1 in the 1555 Lyon Bonhomme edition

Les Prophéties received a mixed reaction when it was published. Some people thought Nostradamus was a servant of evil, a fake, or insane, while many of the elite evidently thought otherwise. Catherine de' Medici, wife of King Henry II of France, was one of Nostradamus's greatest admirers. After reading his almanacs for 1555, which hinted at unnamed threats to the royal family, she summoned him to Paris to explain them and to draw up horoscopes for her children. At the time, he feared that he would be beheaded, but by the time of his death in 1566, Queen Catherine had made him Counselor and Physician-in-Ordinary to her son, the young King Charles IX of France.

In the years since the publication of his Les Prophéties, Nostradamus has attracted many supporters, who, along with much of the popular press, credit him with having accurately predicted many major world events. Most academic sources reject the notion that Nostradamus had any genuine supernatural prophetic abilities and maintain that the associations made between world events and Nostradamus's quatrains are the result of misinterpretations or mistranslations (sometimes deliberate). These academics also argue that Nostradamus's predictions are characteristically vague, meaning they could be applied to virtually anything, and are useless for determining whether their author had any real prophetic powers.

==== Johann Weyer ====
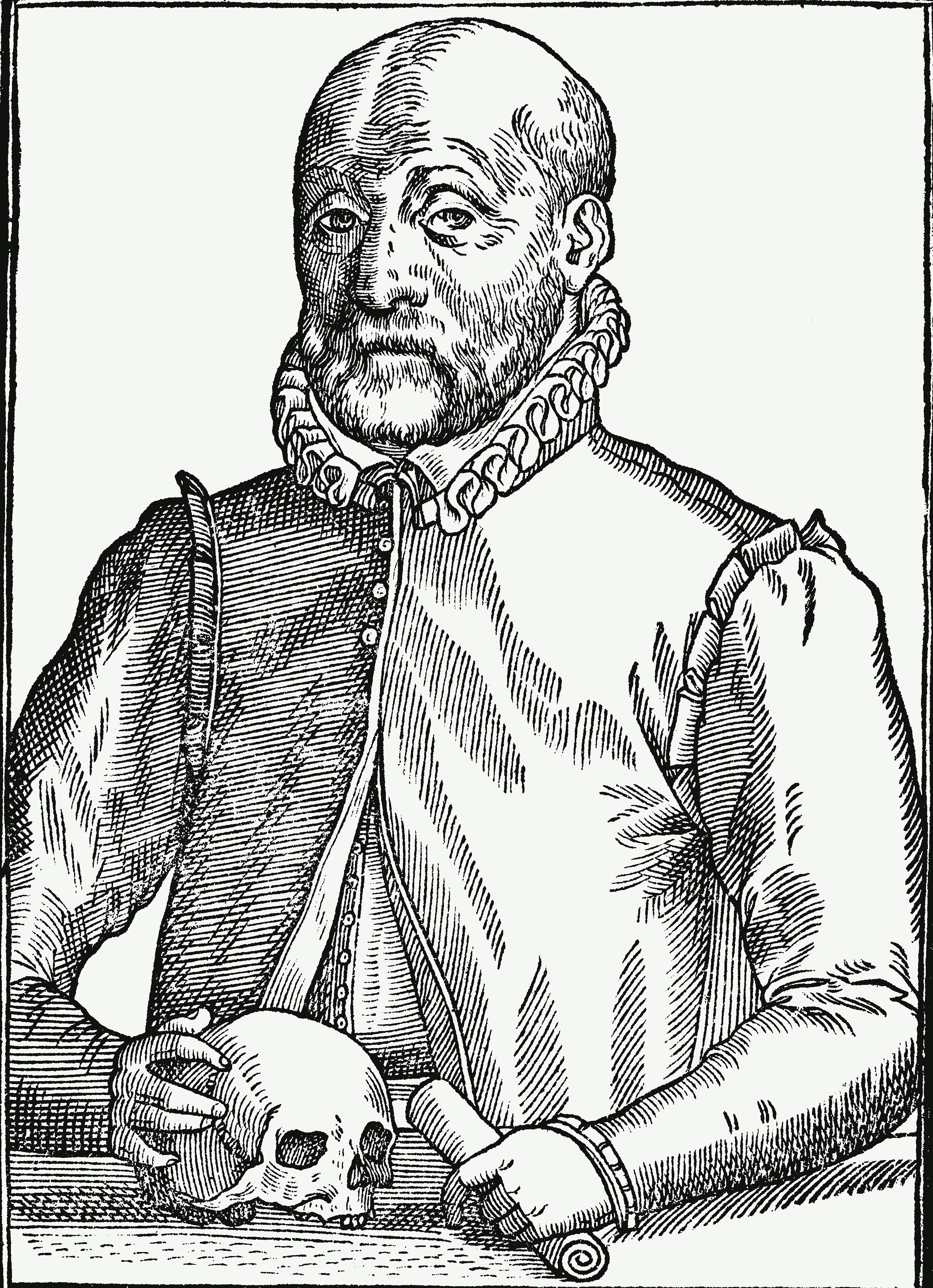
Engraving of Johann Weyer, age 60, from De Lamiis Liber

Johann Weyer (1515–1588) was a Dutch physician, occultist and demonologist, and a disciple and follower of Heinrich Cornelius Agrippa. He was among the first to publish against the persecution of witches. His most influential work is De Praestigiis Daemonum et Incantationibus ac Venificiis ('On the Illusions of the Demons and on Spells and Poisons'; 1563).

Weyer criticised the Malleus Maleficarum and the witch hunting by the Christian and Civil authorities; he is said to have been the first person that used the term mentally ill or melancholy to designate those women accused of practicing witchcraft. In a time when witch trials and executions were just beginning to be common, he sought to derogate the law concerning witchcraft prosecution. He claimed that not only were examples of magic largely incredible but that the crime of witchcraft was literally impossible, so that anyone who confessed to the crime was likely to be suffering some mental disturbance (mainly melancholy, a very flexible category with many different symptoms).

While he defended the idea that the Devil's power was not as strong as claimed by the orthodox Christian churches in De Praestigiis Daemonum, he defended also the idea that demons did have power and could appear before people who called upon them, creating illusions; but he commonly referred to magicians and not to witches when speaking about people who could create illusions, saying they were heretics who were using the Devil's power to do it, and when speaking on witches, he used the term mentally ill.

Moreover, Weyer did not only write the catalogue of demons Pseudomonarchia Daemonum, but also gave their description and the conjurations to invoke them in the appropriate hour and in the name of God and the Trinity, not to create illusions but to oblige them to do the conjurer's will, as well as advice on how to avoid certain perils and tricks if the demon was reluctant to do what he was commanded or a liar. In addition, he wanted to abolish the prosecution of witches, and when speaking on those who invoke demons (which he called spirits) he carefully used the word exorcist.

Weyer never denied the existence of the Devil and a huge number of other demons of high and low order. His work was an inspiration for other occultists and demonologists, including an anonymous author who wrote the Lemegeton (The Lesser Key of Solomon). There were many editions of his books (written in Latin), especially Pseudomonarchia Daemonum, and several adaptations in English, including Reginald Scot's "Discoverie of Witchcraft" (1584).

Weyer's appeal for clemency for those accused of the crime of witchcraft was opposed later in the sixteenth century by the Swiss physician Thomas Erastus, the French legal theorist Jean Bodin and King James VI of Scotland.

==== John Dee and Edward Kelley ====
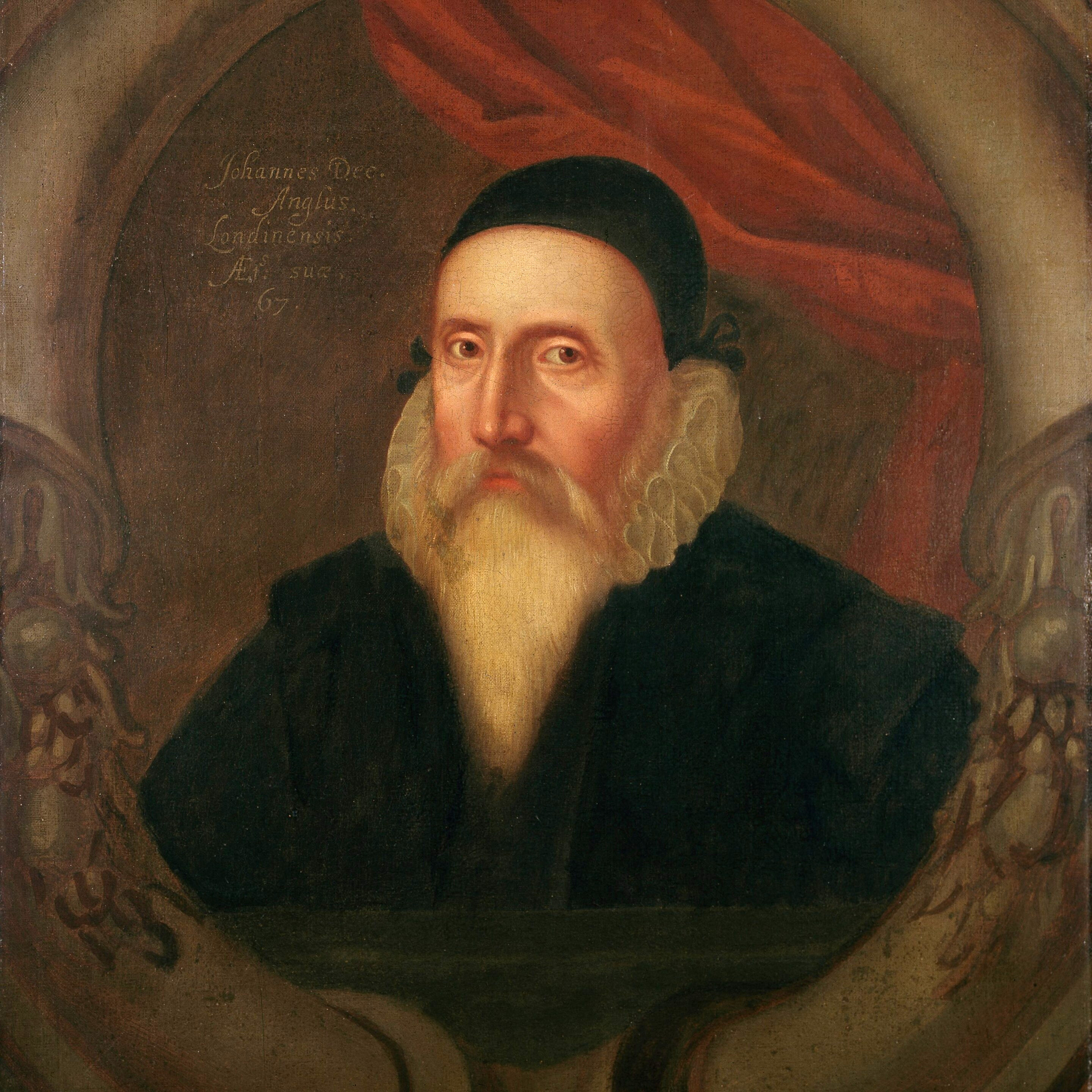
A 16th-century portrait by an unknown artist (Note: According to Fell Smith (1909) it was painted when Dee was 67. It belonged to a grandson, Rowland Dee, and later to Elias Ashmole, who left it to Oxford University.)

John Dee (1527–1608 or 1609) was an English mathematician, astronomer, astrologer, teacher, occultist, and alchemist. He was the court astrologer for, and advisor to, Elizabeth I. A student of the Renaissance Neo-Platonism of Marsilio Ficino, he spent much of his time on alchemy, divination and Hermetic philosophy. As an antiquarian, he had one of the largest libraries in England at the time. As a political advisor, he advocated for the founding of English colonies in the New World to form a "British Empire", a term he is credited with coining.

Dee was an intense Christian, but his religiosity was influenced by Hermetic and Platonic-Pythagorean doctrines pervasive in the Renaissance. He believed that numbers were the basis of all things and key to knowledge. From Hermeticism he drew a belief that man had the potential for divine power that could be exercised through mathematics. His goal was to help bring forth a unified world religion through the healing of the breach of the Roman Catholic and Protestant churches and the recapture of the pure theology of the ancients.

In 1564, Dee wrote the Hermetic work Monas Hieroglyphica ("The Hieroglyphic Monad"), an exhaustive Cabalistic interpretation of a glyph of his own design, meant to express the mystical unity of all creation. Having dedicated it to Maximilian II, Holy Roman Emperor in an effort to gain patronage, Dee attempted to present it to him at the time of his ascension to the throne of Hungary. The work was esteemed by many of Dee's contemporaries, but cannot be interpreted today in the absence of the secret oral tradition of that era.

By the early 1580s, Dee was discontented with his progress in learning the secrets of nature. He subsequently began to turn energetically towards the supernatural as a means to acquire knowledge. He sought to contact spirits through the use of a "scryer" or crystal-gazer, which he thought would act as an intermediary between himself and the angels.

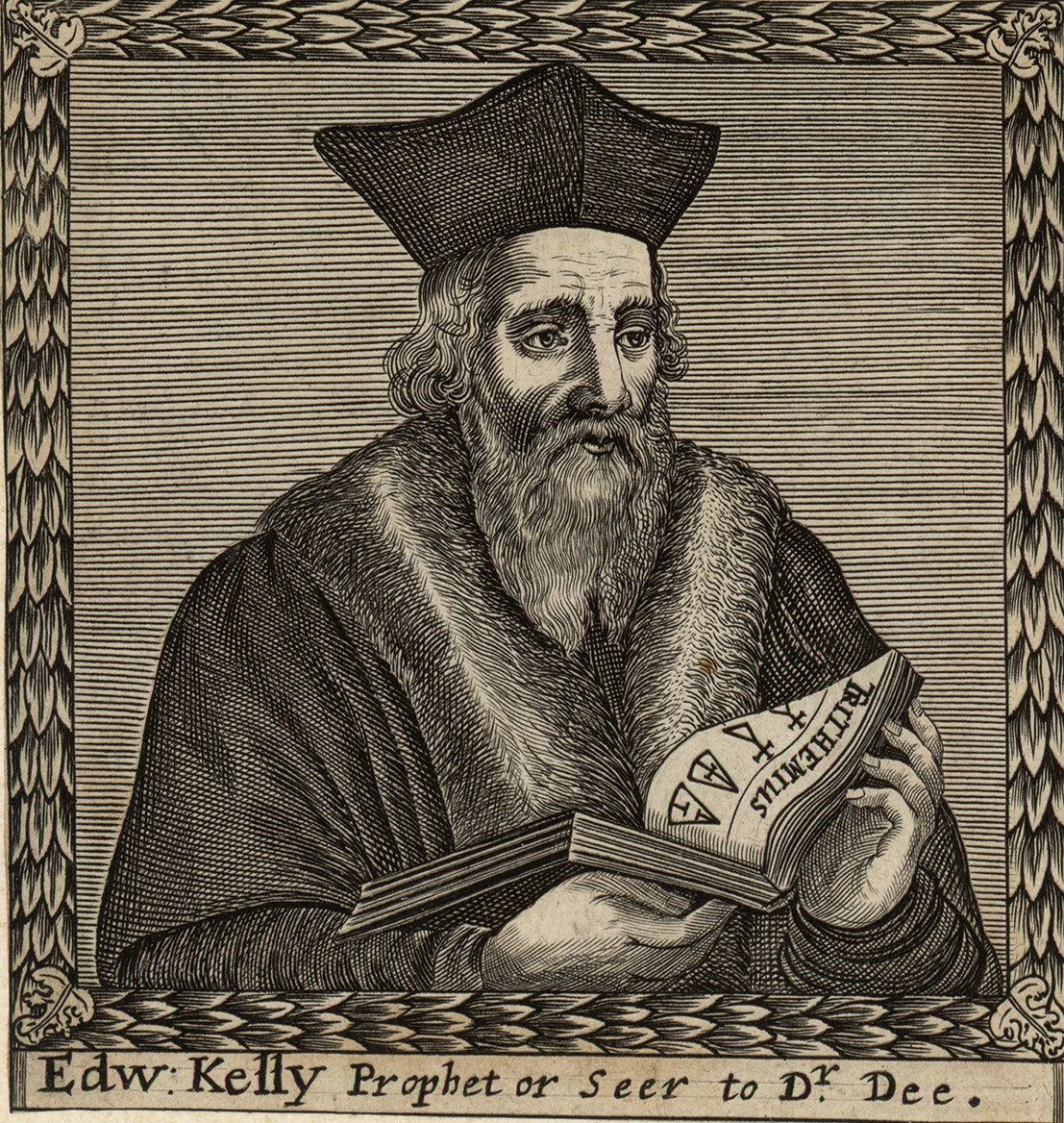
Edward Kelley

Dee's first attempts with several scryers were unsatisfactory, but in 1582 he met Edward Kelley (1555–1597/8), then calling himself Edward Talbot to disguise his conviction for "coining" or forgery, who impressed him greatly with his abilities. Dee took Kelley into his service and began to devote all his energies to his supernatural pursuits. These "spiritual conferences" or "actions" were conducted with intense Christian piety, always after periods of purification, prayer and fasting. Dee was convinced of the benefits they could bring to mankind. The character of Kelley is harder to assess: some conclude that he acted with cynicism, but delusion or self-deception cannot be ruled out. Kelley's "output" is remarkable for its volume, intricacy and vividness. Dee claimed that angels laboriously dictated several books to him this way, through Kelley, some in a special angelic or Enochian language.

In 1583, Dee met the impoverished yet popular Polish nobleman Albert Łaski, who, after overstaying his welcome at court, invited Dee to accompany him back to Poland. With some prompting by the "angels" (again through Kelley) and by dint of his worsening status at court, Dee decided to do so. He, Kelley, and their families left in September 1583, but Łaski proved to be bankrupt and out of favour in his own country. Dee and Kelley began a nomadic life in Central Europe, meanwhile continuing their spiritual conferences, which Dee detailed in his diaries and almanacs. They had audiences with Emperor Rudolf II in Prague Castle and King Stephen Bathory of Poland, whom they attempted to convince of the importance of angelic communication.

In 1587, at a spiritual conference in Bohemia, Kelley told Dee that the angel Uriel had ordered the men to share all their possessions, including their wives. By this time, Kelley had gained some renown as an alchemist and was more sought-after than Dee in this regard: it was a line of work that had prospects for serious and long-term financial gain, especially among the royal families of central Europe. Dee, however, was more interested in communicating with angels, who he believed would help him solve the mysteries of the heavens through mathematics, optics, astrology, science and navigation. Perhaps Kelley in fact wished to end Dee's dependence on him as a diviner at their increasingly lengthy, frequent spiritual conferences. The order for wife-sharing caused Dee anguish, but he apparently did not doubt it was genuine and they apparently shared wives. However, Dee broke off the conferences immediately afterwards. He returned to England in 1589, while Kelley went on to be the alchemist to Emperor Rudolf II.

By 1590 Kelley was living an opulent lifestyle in Europe, enjoying the patronage of nobility: he received several estates and large sums of money from Rosenberg. Meanwhile, he continued his alchemical experiments until he had convinced Rudolf II that he was ready to start producing gold, the purpose of his work. Rudolf knighted him Sir Edward Kelley of Imany and New Lüben on 23 February 1590 (but it is possible that this happened in 1589). In May 1591, Rudolf had Kelley arrested and imprisoned in the Křivoklát Castle outside Prague, supposedly for killing an official named Jiri Hunkler in a duel; it is possible that he also did not want Kelley to escape before he had actually produced any gold. In 1595, Kelly agreed to co-operate and return to his alchemical work; he was released and restored to his former status. When he failed to produce any gold, he was again imprisoned, this time in Hněvín Castle in Most. His wife and stepdaughter attempted to hire an imperial counselor who might free Kelley from imprisonment, but he died a prisoner in late 1597/early 1598 of injuries received while attempting to escape.

A few of Kelley's writings are extant today, including two alchemical verse treatises in English, and three other treatises, which he dedicated to Rudolf II from prison. They were entitled Tractatus duo egregii de lapide philosophorum una cum theatro astronomiae (1676). The treatises have been translated as The Alchemical Writings of Edward Kelley (1893).

==== Giordano Bruno ====
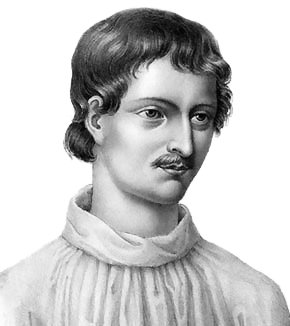
Modern portrait of Giordano Bruno based on a woodcut from Livre du recteur, 1578

Giordano Bruno (1548–1600) was an Italian Dominican friar, philosopher, mathematician, poet, cosmological theorist, and Hermetic occultist. He is known for his cosmological theories, which conceptually extended the then-novel Copernican model. He proposed that the stars were distant suns surrounded by their own planets, and he raised the possibility that these planets might foster life of their own, a cosmological position known as cosmic pluralism. He also insisted that the universe is infinite and could have no "center".

In addition to cosmology, Bruno also wrote extensively on the art of memory, a loosely organized group of mnemonic techniques and principles. Historian Frances Yates argues that Bruno was deeply influenced by Islamic astrology (particularly the philosophy of Averroes), Neoplatonism, Renaissance Hermeticism, and Genesis-like legends surrounding the Egyptian god Thoth. (Note: The primary work on the relationship between Bruno and Hermeticism is Yates (1964); for an alternative assessment, placing more emphasis on the Kabbalah, and less on Hermeticism, see De León-Jones (1997); for a return to emphasis on Bruno's role in the development of Science, and criticism of Yates' emphasis on magical and Hermetic themes, see Gatti (2002).) Other studies of Bruno have focused on his qualitative approach to mathematics and his application of the spatial concepts of geometry to language.

In 1584, Bruno published two important philosophical dialogues (La Cena de le Ceneri and De l'infinito universo et mondi) in which he argued against the planetary spheres (Christoph Rothmann did the same in 1586 as did Tycho Brahe in 1587) and affirmed the Copernican principle. In particular, to support the Copernican view and oppose the objection according to which the motion of the Earth would be perceived by means of the motion of winds, clouds etc., in La Cena de le Ceneri Bruno anticipates some of the arguments of Galilei on the relativity principle.

Bruno's cosmology distinguishes between "suns" which produce their own light and heat, and have other bodies moving around them; and "earths" which move around suns and receive light and heat from them. Bruno suggested that some, if not all, of the objects classically known as fixed stars are in fact suns. According to astrophysicist Steven Soter, he was the first person to grasp that "stars are other suns with their own planets." Bruno wrote that other worlds "have no less virtue nor a nature different from that of our Earth" and, like Earth, "contain animals and inhabitants".

In 1588, he went to Prague, where he obtained 300 taler from Rudolf II, but no teaching position. He went on to serve briefly as a professor in Helmstedt, but had to flee when he was excommunicated by the Lutherans. During this period he produced several Latin works, dictated to his friend and secretary Girolamo Besler, including De Magia (On Magic), Theses De Magia (Theses on Magic) and De Vinculis in Genere (A General Account of Bonding). All these were apparently transcribed or recorded by Besler (or Bisler) between 1589 and 1590. He also published De Imaginum, Signorum, Et Idearum Compositione (On the Composition of Images, Signs and Ideas, 1591).

Starting in 1593, Bruno was tried for heresy by the Roman Inquisition on charges of denial of several core Catholic doctrines, including eternal damnation, the Trinity, the divinity of Christ, the virginity of Mary, and transubstantiation. Bruno's pantheism was not taken lightly by the church, (Note: Birx (1997): "Bruno was burned to death at the stake for his pantheistic stance and cosmic perspective.") nor was his teaching of the transmigration of the soul (reincarnation). The Inquisition found him guilty, and he was burned at the stake in Rome's Campo de' Fiori in 1600. After his death, he gained considerable fame, being particularly celebrated by 19th- and early 20th-century commentators who regarded him as a martyr for science, although most historians agree that his heresy trial was not a response to his cosmological views but rather a response to his religious and afterlife views. (Note: Crowe (1986), p. 10: "[Bruno's] sources... seem to have been more numerous than his followers, at least until the eighteenth- and nineteenth-century revival of interest in Bruno as a supposed 'martyr for science.' It is true that he was burned at the stake in Rome in 1600, but the church authorities guilty of this action were almost certainly more distressed at his denial of Christ's divinity and alleged diabolism than at his cosmological doctrines.") (Note: Frank (2009), p. 24: "Though Bruno may have been a brilliant thinker whose work stands as a bridge between ancient and modern thought, his persecution cannot be seen solely in light of the war between science and religion.") (Note: White (2002), p. 7: "This was perhaps the most dangerous notion of all... If other worlds existed with intelligent beings living there, did they too have their visitations? The idea was quite unthinkable.") (Note: Shackelford (2009), p. 66: "Yet the fact remains that cosmological matters, notably the plurality of worlds, were an identifiable concern all along and appear in the summary document: Bruno was repeatedly questioned on these matters, and he apparently refused to recant them at the end.14 So, Bruno probably was burned alive for resolutely maintaining a series of heresies, among which his teaching of the plurality of worlds was prominent but by no means singular.") However some historians do contend that the main reason for Bruno's death was indeed his cosmological views. Bruno's case is still considered a landmark in the history of free thought and the emerging sciences. (Note: Gatti (2002), pp. 18–19: "For Bruno was claiming for the philosopher a principle of free thought and inquiry which implied an entirely new concept of authority: that of the individual intellect in its serious and continuing pursuit of an autonomous inquiry… It is impossible to understand the issue involved and to evaluate justly the stand made by Bruno with his life without appreciating the question of free thought and liberty of expression. His insistence on placing this issue at the center of both his work and of his defense is why Bruno remains so much a figure of the modern world. If there is, as many have argued, an intrinsic link between science and liberty of inquiry, then Bruno was among those who guaranteed the future of the newly emerging sciences, as well as claiming in wider terms a general principle of free thought and expression.") (Note: Montano (2007), p. 71: "In Rome, Bruno was imprisoned for seven years and subjected to a difficult trial that analyzed, minutely, all his philosophical ideas. Bruno, who in Venice had been willing to recant some theses, became increasingly resolute and declared on 21 December 1599 that he 'did not wish to repent of having too little to repent, and in fact did not know what to repent.' Declared an unrepentant heretic and excommunicated, he was burned alive in the Campo dei Fiori in Rome on Ash Wednesday, 17 February 1600. On the stake, along with Bruno, burned the hopes of many, including philosophers and scientists of good faith like Galileo, who thought they could reconcile religious faith and scientific research, while belonging to an ecclesiastical organization declaring itself to be the custodian of absolute truth and maintaining a cultural militancy requiring continual commitment and suspicion.")

==== Giambattista della Porta ====
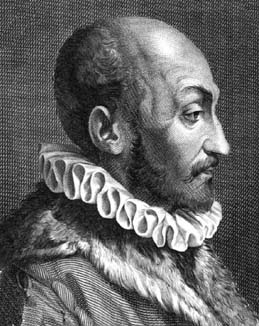
Giambattista della Porta

Giambattista della Porta (1535–1615) was an Italian scholar, polymath and playwright who lived in Naples at the time of the Scientific Revolution and Reformation. His most famous work, first published in 1558, is entitled Magia Naturalis (Natural Magic). In this book he covered a variety of the subjects he had investigated, including occult philosophy, astrology, alchemy, mathematics, meteorology, and natural philosophy. He was also referred to as "professor of secrets".

In Natural Magic, della Porta describes an imaginary device known as a sympathetic telegraph. The device consisted of two circular boxes, similar to compasses, each with a magnetic needle, supposed to be magnetized by the same lodestone. Each box was to be labeled with the 26 letters, instead of the usual directions. Della Porta assumed that this would coordinate the needles such that when a letter was dialed in one box, the needle in the other box would swing to point to the same letter, thereby helping in communicating,

In 1563, della Porta published De Furtivis Literarum Notis, a work about cryptography. In it he described the first known digraphic substitution cipher. Charles J. Mendelsohn commented:

He was, in my opinion, the outstanding cryptographer of the Renaissance. Some unknown who worked in a hidden room behind closed doors may possibly have surpassed him in general grasp of the subject, but among those whose work can be studied he towers like a giant.

Della Porta invented a method which allowed him to write secret messages on the inside of eggs. During the Spanish Inquisition, some of his friends were imprisoned. At the gate of the prison, everything was checked except for eggs. Della Porta wrote messages on the egg shell using a mixture made of plant pigments and alum. The ink penetrated the egg shell which is semi-porous. When the egg shell was dry, he boiled the egg in hot water and the ink on the outside of the egg was washed away. When the recipient in prison peeled off the shell, the message was revealed once again on the egg white.

Della Porta was the founder of a scientific society called the Academia Secretorum Naturae (Accademia dei Segreti). This group was more commonly known as the Otiosi, (Men of Leisure). Founded sometime before 1580, the Otiosi were one of the first scientific societies in Europe and their aim was to study the "secrets of nature." Any person applying for membership had to demonstrate they had made a new discovery in the natural sciences.

The Academia Secretorum Naturae was compelled to disband when its members were suspected of dealing with the occult. A Catholic, della Porta was examined by the Inquisition and summoned to Rome by Pope Gregory XIII. Though he personally emerged from the meeting unscathed, he was forced to disband his Academia Secretorum Naturae, and in 1592 his philosophical works were prohibited from further publication by the Church. The ban was lifted in 1598.

Despite this incident, della Porta remained religiously devout and became a lay Jesuit brother. Porta's involvement with the Inquisition puzzles historians due his active participation in charitable Jesuit works by 1585. A possible explanation for this lies in Porta's personal relations with Fra Paolo Sarpi after 1579.

==== Heinrich Khunrath ====
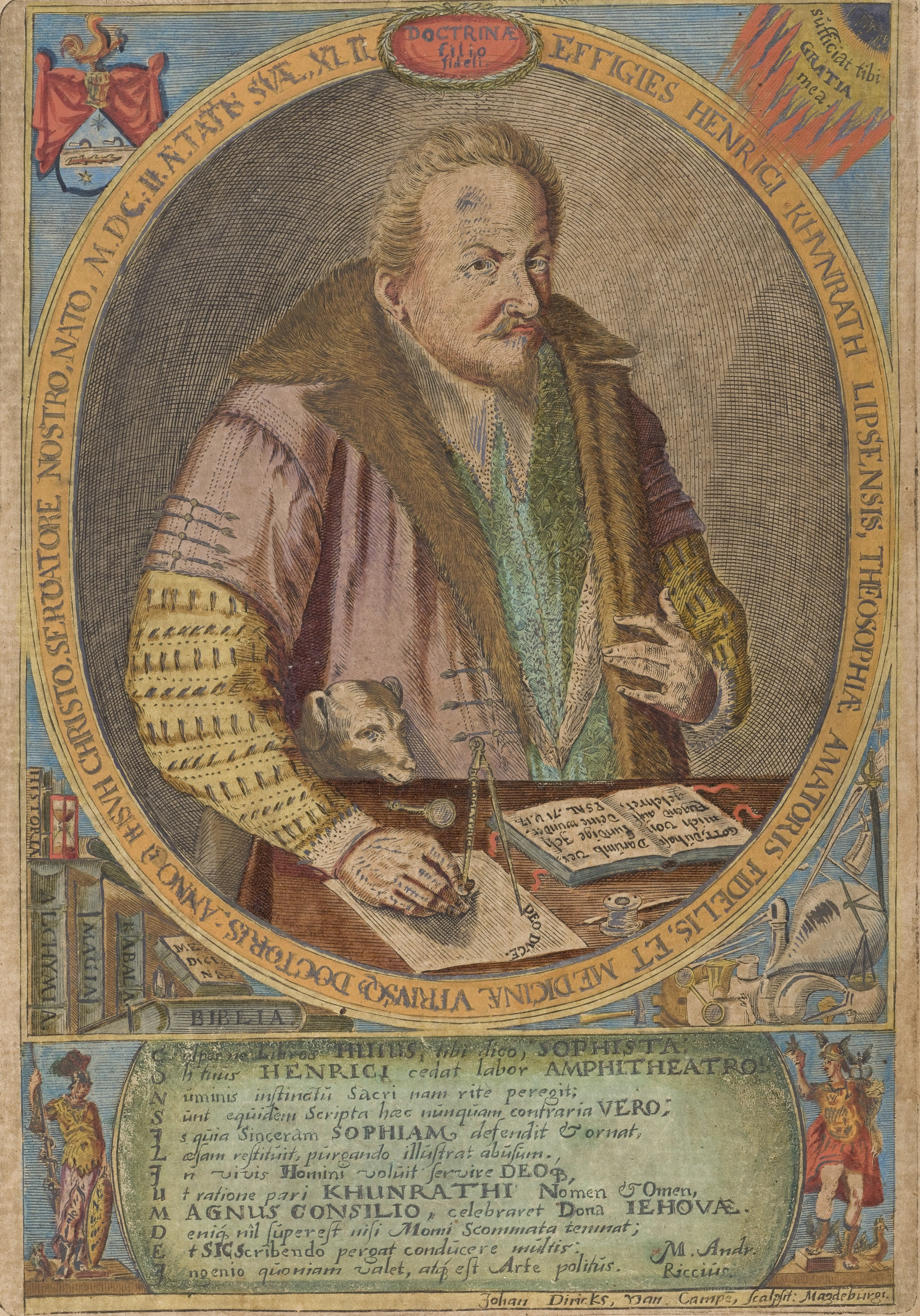
Portrait of Heinrich Khunrath from his Amphitheatrum sapientiae aeternae

Heinrich Khunrath (c. 1560–1605) was a German physician, hermetic philosopher, and alchemist. Frances Yates considered him to be a link between the philosophy of John Dee and Rosicrucianism. His name, in the spelling "Henricus Künraht" was used as a pseudonym for the 1670 publisher of the Tractatus Theologico-Politicus of Baruch Spinoza.

Khunrath, a disciple of Paracelsus, practiced medicine in Dresden, Magdeburg, and Hamburg and may have held a professorial position in Leipzig. He travelled widely after 1588, including a stay at the Imperial court in Prague, home to the mystically inclined Habsburg emperor Rudolf II. Before reaching Prague he had met John Dee at Bremen on 27 May 1589, when Dee was on his way back to England from Bohemia. Khunrath praised Dee in his later works. During his court stay Khunrath met the alchemist Edward Kelley who had remained behind after he and Dee had parted company. In September 1591, Khunrath was appointed court physician to Count Rosemberk in Trebona. He probably met Johann Thölde while at Trebona, one of the suggested authors of the "Basilius Valentinus" treatises on alchemy.

Khunrath's brushes with John Dee and Thölde and Paracelsian beliefs led him to develop a Christianized natural magic, seeking to find the secret prima materia that would lead man into eternal wisdom. The Christianized view that Khunrath took was framed around his commitment to Lutheran theology. He also held that experience and observation were essential to practical alchemical research, as would a natural philosopher.

His most famous work on alchemy is the Amphitheatrum Sapientiae Aeternae (Amphitheater of Eternal Wisdom), a work on the mystical aspects of that art, which contains the oft-seen engraving entitled "The First Stage of the Great Work", better-known as the "Alchemist's Laboratory". The book was first published at Hamburg in 1595, with four circular elaborate, hand-colored, engraved plates heightened with gold and silver which Khunrath designed and were engraved by Paullus van der Doort. The book was then made more widely available in an expanded edition with the addition of other plates published posthumously in Hanau in 1609.

Amphitheatrum Sapientiae Aeternae is an alchemical classic, combining both Christianity and magic. In it, Khunrath showed himself to be an adept of spiritual alchemy and illustrated the many-staged and intricate path to spiritual perfection. Khunrath's work was important in Lutheran circles. John Warwick Montgomery has pointed out that Johann Arndt (1555–1621), who was the influential writer of Lutheran books of pietiesm and devotion, composed a commentary on Amphitheatrum. Some of the ideas in his works are Kabbalistic in nature and foreshadow Rosicrucianism.

==== Other Renaissance writers and practitioners ====
Other writers and practitioners on occult or magical topics during this period include:

- Thomas Charnock (1524–1581) was an English alchemist and occultist who devoted his life to the quest for the Philosopher's Stone.
- Nicolas Flamel (1330–1418) was a French scribe and manuscript-seller. After his death, Flamel developed a reputation as an alchemist believed to have discovered the philosopher's stone and to have thereby achieved immortality. These legendary accounts first appeared in the late 16th century. Several late 16th- to early 17th-century works are attributed to Flamel.
- Basil Valentine (pseudonym for one or more 16th-century authors) known especially for The Twelve Keys of Basil Valentine (1599).
- Michael Sendivogius (1566–1636)
- Tommaso Campanella (1568–1639)
- Jakob Böhme (1575–1624)
- Jan Baptist van Helmont (1577–1644)

== Baroque practitioners ==
Writers on and practitioners on occult or magical topics during this period include:

- Franz Kessler (1580–1650)
- Adrian von Mynsicht (1603–1638)
- Sir Kenelm Digby (1603–1665)
- Johann Friedrich Schweitzer (1625–1709)
- Isaac Newton (1642–1727), see Isaac Newton's occult studies

== Modern ceremonial magic ==
By the nineteenth century, European intellectuals no longer saw the practice of magic through the framework of sin and instead regarded magical practices and beliefs as "an aberrational mode of thought antithetical to the dominant cultural logic – a sign of psychological impairment and marker of racial or cultural inferiority".

As educated elites in Western societies increasingly rejected the efficacy of magical practices, legal systems ceased to threaten practitioners of magical activities with punishment for the crimes of diabolism and witchcraft, and instead threatened them with the accusation that they were defrauding people through promising to provide things which they could not.

This spread of European colonial power across the world influenced how academics would come to frame the concept of magic. In the nineteenth century, several scholars adopted the traditional, negative concept of magic. That they chose to do so was not inevitable, for they could have followed the example adopted by prominent esotericists active at the time like Helena Blavatsky who had chosen to use the term and concept of magic in a positive sense. Various writers also used the concept of magic to criticise religion by arguing that the latter still displayed many of the negative traits of the former. An example of this was the American journalist H. L. Mencken in his polemical 1930 work Treatise on the Gods; he sought to critique religion by comparing it to magic, arguing that the division between the two was misplaced. The concept of magic was also adopted by theorists in the new field of psychology, where it was often used synonymously with superstition, although the latter term proved more common in early psychological texts.

In the late nineteenth and twentieth centuries, folklorists examined rural communities across Europe in search of magical practices, which at the time they typically understood as survivals of ancient belief systems. It was only in the 1960s that anthropologists like Jeanne Favret-Saada also began looking in depth at magic in European contexts, having previously focused on examining magic in non-Western contexts. In the twentieth century, magic also proved a topic of interest to the Surrealists, an artistic movement based largely in Europe; the Surrealism André Breton for instance published L'Art magique in 1957, discussing what he regarded as the links between magic and art.

The scholarly application of magic as a sui generis category that can be applied to any socio-cultural context was linked with the promotion of modernity to both Western and non-Western audiences.

The term magic has become pervasive in the popular imagination and idiom. In contemporary contexts, the word magic is sometimes used to "describe a type of excitement, of wonder, or sudden delight", and in such a context can be "a term of high praise". Despite its historical contrast against science, scientists have also adopted the term in application to various concepts, such as magic acid, magic bullets, and magic angles.

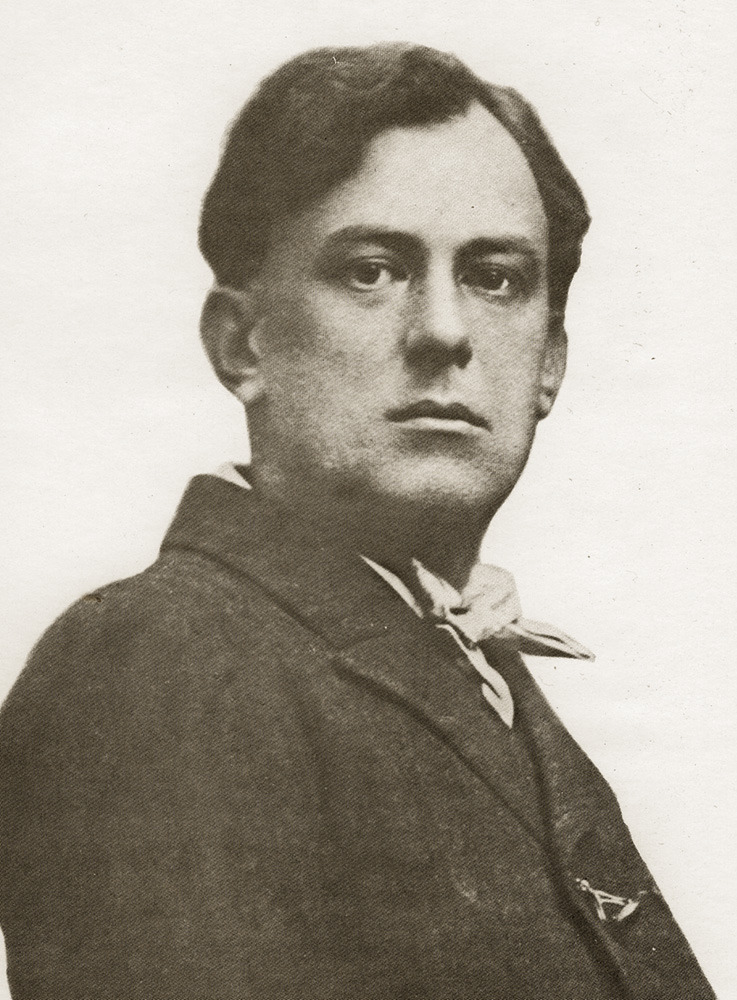
Many concepts of modern ceremonial magic are heavily influenced by the ideas of Aleister Crowley.

Modern Western magic has challenged widely-held preconceptions about contemporary religion and spirituality. The polemical discourses about magic influenced the self-understanding of modern magicians, several whom—such as Aleister Crowley and Julius Evola—were well versed in academic literature on the subject. According to scholar of religion Henrik Bogdan, "arguably the best known emic definition" of the term magic was provided by Crowley. Crowley—who favoured the spelling 'magick' over magic to distinguish it from stage illusionism—was of the view that "Magick is the Science and Art of causing Change to occur in conformity with Will". Crowley's definition influenced that of subsequent magicians. Dion Fortune of the Fraternity of the Inner Light for instance stated that "Magic is the art of changing consciousness according to Will". Gerald Gardner, the founder of Gardnerian Wicca, stated that magic was "attempting to cause the physically unusual", while Anton LaVey, the founder of LaVeyan Satanism, described magic as "the change in situations or events in accordance with one's will, which would, using normally acceptable methods, be unchangeable."

The chaos magic movement emerged during the late 20th century, as an attempt to strip away the symbolic, ritualistic, theological or otherwise ornamental aspects of other occult traditions and distill magic down to a set of basic techniques.

These modern Western concepts of magic rely on a belief in correspondences connected to an unknown occult force that permeates the universe. As noted by Hanegraaff, this operated according to "a new meaning of magic, which could not possibly have existed in earlier periods, precisely because it is elaborated in reaction to the "disenchantment of the world"." For many, and perhaps most, modern Western magicians, the goal of magic is deemed to be personal spiritual development. The perception of magic as a form of self-development is central to the way that magical practices have been adopted into forms of modern Paganism and the New Age phenomenon. One significant development within modern Western magical practices has been sex magic. This was a practice promoted in the writings of Paschal Beverly Randolph and subsequently exerted a strong interest on occultist magicians like Crowley and Theodor Reuss.

The adoption of the term magic by modern occultists can in some instances be a deliberate attempt to champion those areas of Western society which have traditionally been marginalised as a means of subverting dominant systems of power. The influential American Wiccan and author Starhawk for instance stated that "Magic is another word that makes people uneasy, so I use it deliberately, because the words we are comfortable with, the words that sound acceptable, rational, scientific, and intellectually correct, are comfortable precisely because they are the language of estrangement." In the present day, "among some countercultural subgroups the label is considered 'cool'"

Sorcery is a legal concept in Papua New Guinea law, which differentiates between legal good magic, such as healing and fertility, and illegal black magic, held responsible for unexplained deaths.

=== Conceptual development ===
According to anthropologist Edward Evan Evans-Pritchard, magic formed a rational framework of beliefs and knowledge in some cultures, like the Azande people of Africa. The historian Owen Davies stated that the word magic was "beyond simple definition", and had "a range of meanings". Similarly, the historian Michael D. Bailey characterised magic as "a deeply contested category and a very fraught label"; as a category, he noted, it was "profoundly unstable" given that definitions of the term have "varied dramatically across time and between cultures". Scholars have engaged in extensive debates as to how to define magic, with such debates resulting in intense dispute. Throughout such debates, the scholarly community has failed to agree on a definition of magic, in a similar manner to how they have failed to agree on a definition of religion. According with scholar of religion Michael Stausberg the phenomenon of people applying the concept of magic to refer to themselves and their own practices and beliefs goes as far back as late antiquity. However, even among those throughout history who have described themselves as magicians, there has been no common ground of what magic is.

In Africa, the word magic might simply be understood as denoting management of forces, which, as an activity, is not weighted morally and is accordingly a neutral activity from the start of a magical practice, but by the will of the magician, is thought to become and to have an outcome which represents either good or bad (evil). Ancient African culture was in the habit customarily of always discerning difference between magic, and a group of other things, which are not magic, these things were medicine, divination, witchcraft and sorcery. Opinion differs on how religion and magic are related to each other with respect development or to which developed from which, some think they developed together from a shared origin, some think religion developed from magic, and some, magic from religion.

Anthropological and sociological theories of magic generally serve to sharply demarcate certain practices from other, otherwise similar practices in a given society. According to Bailey: "In many cultures and across various historical periods, categories of magic often define and maintain the limits of socially and culturally acceptable actions in respect to numinous or occult entities or forces. Even more, basically, they serve to delineate arenas of appropriate belief." In this, he noted that "drawing these distinctions is an exercise in power". This tendency has had repercussions for the study of magic, with academics self-censoring their research because of the effects on their careers.

Randall Styers noted that attempting to define magic represents "an act of demarcation" by which it is juxtaposed against "other social practices and modes of knowledge" such as religion and science. The historian Karen Louise Jolly described magic as "a category of exclusion, used to define an unacceptable way of thinking as either the opposite of religion or of science".

Modern scholarship has produced various definitions and theories of magic. According to Bailey, "these have typically framed magic in relation to, or more frequently in distinction from, religion and science." Since the emergence of the study of religion and the social sciences, magic has been a "central theme in the theoretical literature" produced by scholars operating in these academic disciplines. Magic is one of the most heavily theorized concepts in the study of religion, and also played a key role in early theorising within anthropology. Styers believed that it held such a strong appeal for social theorists because it provides "such a rich site for articulating and contesting the nature and boundaries of modernity". Scholars have commonly used it as a foil for the concept of religion, regarding magic as the "illegitimate (and effeminized) sibling" of religion. Alternately, others have used it as a middle-ground category located between religion and science.

The context in which scholars framed their discussions of magic was informed by the spread of European colonial power across the world in the modern period. These repeated attempts to define magic resonated with broader social concerns, and the pliability of the concept has allowed it to be "readily adaptable as a polemical and ideological tool". The links that intellectuals made between magic and those they characterized as primitives helped to legitimise European and Euro-American imperialism and colonialism, as these Western colonialists expressed the view that those who believed in and practiced magic were unfit to govern themselves and should be governed by those who, rather than believing in magic, believed in science and/or (Christian) religion. In Bailey's words, "the association of certain peoples [whether non-Europeans or poor, rural Europeans] with magic served to distance and differentiate them from those who ruled over them, and in large part to justify that rule."

Many different definitions of magic have been offered by scholars, although—according to Hanegraaff—these can be understood as variations of a small number of heavily influential theories.

==== Intellectualist approach ====
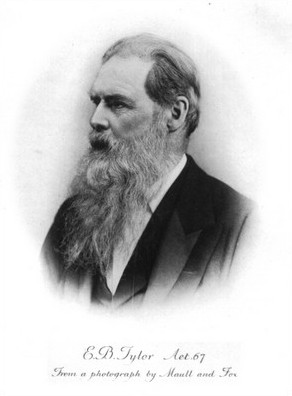
Edward Tylor, an anthropologist who used the term magic in reference to sympathetic magic, an idea that he associated with his concept of animism

The intellectualist approach to defining magic is associated with two prominent British anthropologists, Edward Tylor and James G. Frazer. This approach viewed magic as the theoretical opposite of science, and came to preoccupy much anthropological thought on the subject. This approach was situated within the evolutionary models which underpinned thinking in the social sciences during the early 19th century. The first social scientist to present magic as something that predated religion in an evolutionary development was Herbert Spencer; in his A System of Synthetic Philosophy, he used the term magic in reference to sympathetic magic. Spencer regarded both magic and religion as being rooted in false speculation about the nature of objects and their relationship to other things.

Tylor's understanding of magic was linked to his concept of animism. In his 1871 book Primitive Culture, Tylor characterized magic as beliefs based on "the error of mistaking ideal analogy for real analogy". In Tylor's view, "primitive man, having come to associate in thought those things which he found by experience to be connected in fact, proceeded erroneously to invert this action, and to conclude that association in thought must involve similar connection in reality. He thus attempted to discover, to foretell, and to cause events by means of processes which we can now see to have only an ideal significance". Tylor was dismissive of magic, describing it as "one of the most pernicious delusions that ever vexed mankind". Tylor's views proved highly influential, and helped to establish magic as a major topic of anthropological research.

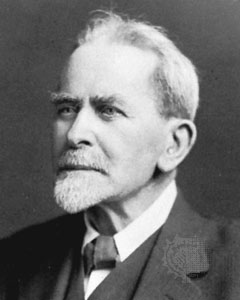
James Frazer regarded magic as the first stage in human development, to be followed by religion and then science

Tylor's ideas were adopted and simplified by James Frazer. He used the term magic to mean sympathetic magic, describing it as a practice relying on the magician's belief "that things act on each other at a distance through a secret sympathy", something which he described as "an invisible ether". He further divided this magic into two forms, the "homeopathic (imitative, mimetic)" and the "contagious". The former was the idea that "like produces like", or that the similarity between two objects could result in one influencing the other. The latter was based on the idea that contact between two objects allowed the two to continue to influence one another at a distance. Like Tylor, Frazer viewed magic negatively, describing it as "the bastard sister of science", arising from "one great disastrous fallacy".

Where Frazer differed from Tylor was in characterizing a belief in magic as a major stage in humanity's cultural development, describing it as part of a tripartite division in which magic came first, religion came second, and eventually science came third. For Frazer, all early societies started as believers in magic, with some of them moving away from this and into religion. He believed that both magic and religion involved a belief in spirits but that they differed in the way that they responded to these spirits. For Frazer, magic "constrains or coerces" these spirits while religion focuses on "conciliating or propitiating them". He acknowledged that their common ground resulted in a cross-over of magical and religious elements in various instances; for instance he claimed that the sacred marriage was a fertility ritual which combined elements from both world-views.

Some scholars retained the evolutionary framework used by Frazer but changed the order of its stages; the German ethnologist Wilhelm Schmidt argued that religion—by which he meant monotheism—was the first stage of human belief, which later degenerated into both magic and polytheism. Others rejected the evolutionary framework entirely. Frazer's notion that magic had given way to religion as part of an evolutionary framework was later deconstructed by the folklorist and anthropologist Andrew Lang in his essay "Magic and Religion"; Lang did so by highlighting how Frazer's framework relied upon misrepresenting ethnographic accounts of beliefs and practices among indigenous Australians to fit his concept of magic.

==== Functionalist approach ====
The functionalist approach to defining magic is associated with the French sociologists Marcel Mauss and Emile Durkheim. In this approach, magic is understood as being the theoretical opposite of religion.

Mauss set forth his conception of magic in a 1902 essay, "A General Theory of Magic". Mauss used the term magic in reference to "any rite that is not part of an organized cult: a rite that is private, secret, mysterious, and ultimately tending towards one that is forbidden". Conversely, he associated religion with organised cult. By saying that magic was inherently non-social, Mauss had been influenced by the traditional Christian understandings of the concept. Mauss deliberately rejected the intellectualist approach promoted by Frazer, believing that it was inappropriate to restrict the term magic to sympathetic magic, as Frazer had done. He expressed the view that "there are not only magical rites which are not sympathetic, but neither is sympathy a prerogative of magic, since there are sympathetic practices in religion".

Mauss' ideas were adopted by Durkheim in his 1912 book The Elementary Forms of the Religious Life. Durkheim was of the view that both magic and religion pertained to "sacred things, that is to say, things set apart and forbidden". Where he saw them as being different was in their social organisation. Durkheim used the term magic to describe things that were inherently anti-social, existing in contrast to what he referred to as a Church, the religious beliefs shared by a social group; in his words, "There is no Church of magic." Durkheim expressed the view that "there is something inherently anti-religious about the maneuvers of the magician", and that a belief in magic "does not result in binding together those who adhere to it, nor in uniting them into a group leading a common life." Durkheim's definition encounters problems in situations—such as the rites performed by Wiccans—in which acts carried out communally have been regarded, either by practitioners or observers, as being magical.

Scholars have criticized the idea that magic and religion can be differentiated into two distinct, separate categories. The social anthropologist Alfred Radcliffe-Brown suggested that "a simple dichotomy between magic and religion" was unhelpful and thus both should be subsumed under the broader category of ritual. Many later anthropologists followed his example. Nevertheless, this distinction is still often made by scholars discussing this topic.

==== Emotionalist approach ====
The emotionalist approach to magic is associated with the English anthropologist Robert Ranulph Marett, the Austrian Sigmund Freud, and the Polish anthropologist Bronisław Malinowski.

Marett viewed magic as a response to stress. In a 1904 article, he argued that magic was a cathartic or stimulating practice designed to relieve feelings of tension. As his thought developed, he increasingly rejected the idea of a division between magic and religion and began to use the term "magico-religious" to describe the early development of both. Malinowski similarly understood magic to Marett, tackling the issue in a 1925 article. He rejected Frazer's evolutionary hypothesis that magic was followed by religion and then science as a series of distinct stages in societal development, arguing that all three were present in each society. In his view, both magic and religion "arise and function in situations of emotional stress" although whereas religion is primarily expressive, magical is primarily practical. He therefore defined magic as "a practical art consisting of acts which are only means to a definite end expected to follow later on". For Malinowski, magical acts were to be carried out for a specific end, whereas religious ones were ends in themselves. He for instance believed that fertility rituals were magical because they were carried out with the intention of meeting a specific need. As part of his functionalist approach, Malinowski saw magic not as irrational but as something that served a useful function, being sensible within the given social and environmental context.

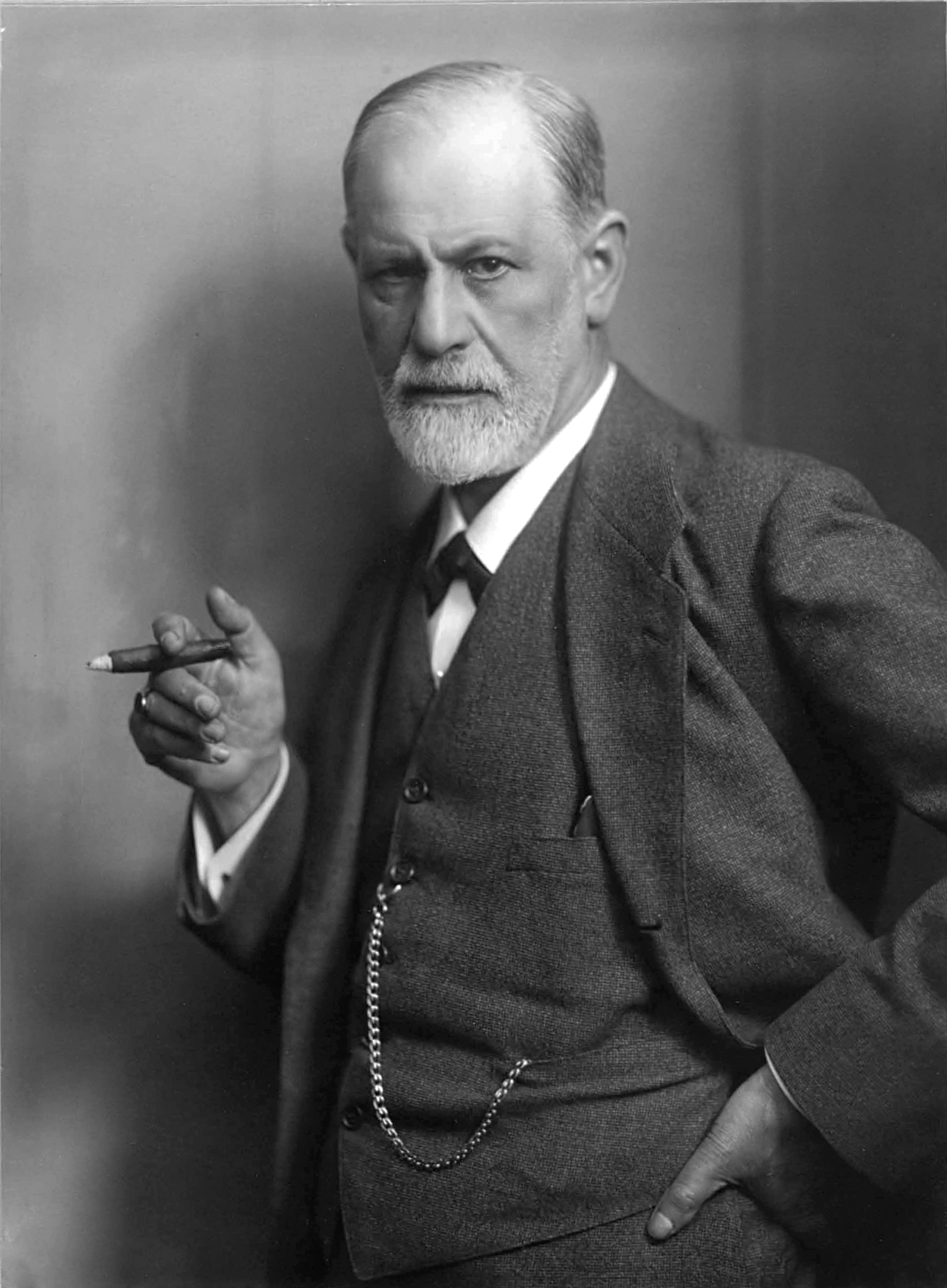
Ideas about magic were also promoted by Sigmund Freud

The term magic was used liberally by Freud. He also saw magic as emerging from human emotion but interpreted it very differently to Marett. Freud explains that "the associated theory of magic merely explains the paths along which magic proceeds; it does not explain its true essence, namely the misunderstanding which leads it to replace the laws of nature by psychological ones". Freud emphasizes that what led primitive men to come up with magic is the power of wishes: "His wishes are accompanied by a motor impulse, the will, which is later destined to alter the whole face of the earth to satisfy his wishes. This motor impulse is at first employed to give a representation of the satisfying situation in such a way that it becomes possible to experience the satisfaction by means of what might be described as motor hallucinations. This kind of representation of a satisfied wish is quite comparable to children's play, which succeeds their earlier purely sensory technique of satisfaction. [...] As time goes on, the psychological accent shifts from the motives for the magical act on to the measures by which it is carried out—that is, on to the act itself. [...] It thus comes to appear as though it is the magical act itself which, owing to its similarity with the desired result, alone determines the occurrence of that result."

In the early 1960s, the anthropologists Murray and Rosalie Wax put forward the argument that scholars should look at the magical worldview of a given society on its own terms rather than trying to rationalize it in terms of Western ideas about scientific knowledge. Their ideas were heavily criticised by other anthropologists, who argued that they had set up a false dichotomy between non-magical Western worldview and magical non-Western worldviews. The concept of the magical worldview nevertheless gained widespread use in history, folkloristics, philosophy, cultural theory, and psychology. The notion of magical thinking has also been utilised by various psychologists. In the 1920s, the psychologist Jean Piaget used the concept as part of their argument that children were unable to clearly differentiate between the mental and the physical. According to this perspective, children begin to abandon their magical thinking between the ages of six and nine.

According to Stanley Tambiah, magic, science, and religion all have their own "quality of rationality", and have been influenced by politics and ideology. As opposed to religion, Tambiah suggests that mankind has a much more personal control over events. Science, according to Tambiah, is "a system of behavior by which man acquires mastery of the environment."

==== Ethnocentrism ====
The magic-religion-science triangle developed in European society based on evolutionary ideas i.e. that magic evolved into religion, which in turn evolved into science. However using a Western analytical tool when discussing non-Western cultures, or pre-modern forms of Western society, raises problems as it may impose alien Western categories on them. While magic remains an emic (insider) term in the history of Western societies, it remains an etic (outsider) term when applied to non-Western societies and even within specific Western societies. For this reason, academics like Michael D. Bailey suggest abandon the term altogether as an academic category. During the twentieth century, many scholars focusing on Asian and African societies rejected the term magic, as well as related concepts like witchcraft, in favour of the more precise terms and concepts that existed within these specific societies like Juju. A similar approach has been taken by many scholars studying pre-modern societies in Europe, such as Classical antiquity, who find the modern concept of magic inappropriate and favour more specific terms originating within the framework of the ancient cultures which they are studying. Alternately, this term implies that all categories of magic are ethnocentric and that such Western preconceptions are an unavoidable component of scholarly research. This century has seen a trend towards emic ethnographic studies by scholar practitioners that explicitly explore the emic/etic divide.

Many scholars have argued that the use of the term as an analytical tool within academic scholarship should be rejected altogether. The scholar of religion Jonathan Z. Smith for example argued that it had no utility as an etic term that scholars should use. The historian of religion Wouter Hanegraaff agreed, on the grounds that its use is founded in conceptions of Western superiority and has "...served as a 'scientific' justification for converting non-European peoples from benighted superstitions..." stating that "the term magic is an important object of historical research, but not intended for doing research."

Bailey noted that, as of the early 21st century, few scholars sought grand definitions of magic but instead focused with "careful attention to particular contexts", examining what a term like magic meant to a given society; this approach, he noted, "call[ed] into question the legitimacy of magic as a universal category". The scholars of religion Berndt-Christian Otto and Michael Stausberg suggested that it would be perfectly possible for scholars to talk about amulets, curses, healing procedures, and other cultural practices often regarded as magical in Western culture without any recourse to the concept of magic itself. The idea that magic should be rejected as an analytic term developed in anthropology, before moving into Classical studies and Biblical studies in the 1980s. Since the 1990s, the term's usage among scholars of religion has declined.

=== Modern practitioners ===
==== Francis Barrett ====
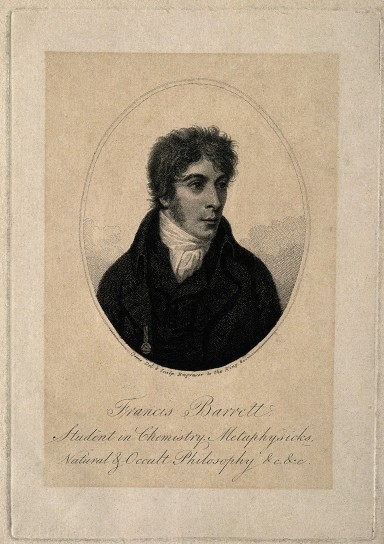
Portrait of Francis Barrett, author of the book The Magus (1801)

Among the various sources for ceremonial magic, Francis Barrett, a late 18th-century Englishman, called himself a student of chemistry, metaphysics, and natural occult philosophy. Barrett was enthusiastic about reviving interest in the occult arts, and published a magical textbook called The Magus. The Magus dealt with the natural magic of herbs and stones, magnetism, talismanic magic, alchemy, numerology, the elements, and biographies of famous adepts from history. It was a compilation, almost entirely consisting of selections from Cornelius Agrippa's Three Books of Occult Philosophy, the Fourth Book of Occult Philosophy attributed to Agrippa, and Robert Turner's 1655 translation of the Heptameron of Peter of Abano. Barrett made modifications and modernized spelling and syntax. Possibly influencing the novelist Edward Bulwer-Lytton, the book gained little other notice until it influenced Eliphas Levi.

==== Éliphas Lévi ====
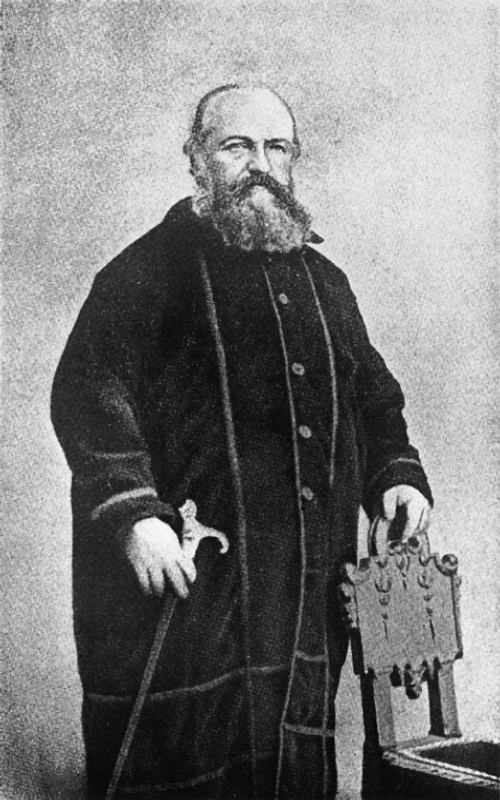
Éliphas Lévi

Éliphas Lévi (1810–1875) conceived the notion of writing a treatise on magic with his friend Bulwer-Lytton. This appeared in 1855 under the title Dogme et Rituel de la Haute Magie, and was translated into English by Arthur Edward Waite as Transcendental Magic, its Doctrine and Ritual.

In 1861, he published a sequel, La Clef des Grands Mystères (The Key to the Great Mysteries). Further magical works by Lévi include Fables et Symboles (Stories and Images), 1862, and La Science des Esprits (The Science of Spirits), 1865. In 1868, he wrote Le Grand Arcane, ou l'Occultisme Dévoilé (The Great Secret, or Occultism Unveiled); this, however, was only published posthumously in 1898.

Lévi's version of magic became a great success, especially after his death. That Spiritualism was popular on both sides of the Atlantic from the 1850s contributed to his success. His magical teachings were free from obvious fanaticisms, even if they remained rather murky; he had nothing to sell, and did not pretend to be the initiate of some ancient or fictitious secret society. He incorporated the Tarot cards into his magical system, and as a result the Tarot has been an important part of the paraphernalia of Western magicians. He had a deep impact on the magic of the Hermetic Order of the Golden Dawn and later Aleister Crowley, and it was largely through this impact that Lévi is remembered as one of the key founders of the twentieth century revival of magic.

==== Hermetic Order of the Golden Dawn ====
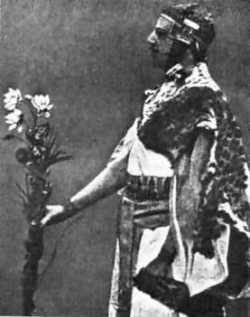
Samuel Liddell MacGregor Mathers (1854–1918), in Egyptian costume, performs a ritual of Isis in the rites of the Golden Dawn

The Hermetic Order of the Golden Dawn (founded 1888) was a secret society devoted to the study and practice of the occult, metaphysics, and paranormal activities during the late 19th and early 20th centuries. Known as a magical order, the Hermetic Order of the Golden Dawn was active in Great Britain and focused its practices on theurgy and spiritual development. Many present-day concepts of ritual and magic that are at the centre of contemporary traditions, such as Wicca and Thelema, were inspired by the Golden Dawn, which became one of the largest single influences on 20th century Western occultism. (Note: Jenkins (2000), p. 74: "Also in the 1880s, the tradition of ritual magic was revived in London by a group of Masonic adepts, who formed the Order of the Golden Dawn, which would prove an incalculable influence on the whole subsequent history of occultism.") (Note: Smoley (1999), pp. 102–103: "Founded in 1888, the Golden Dawn lasted a mere twelve years before it was shattered by personal conflicts. At its height, it probably had no more than a hundred members. Yet its influence on magic and esoteric thought in the English-speaking world would be hard to overestimate.")

The three founders, William Robert Woodman, William Wynn Westcott, and Samuel Liddell Mathers, were Freemasons. Westcott appears to have been the initial driving force behind the establishment of the Golden Dawn.

The "Golden Dawn" was the first of three Orders, although all three are often collectively referred to as the "Golden Dawn". The First Order taught esoteric philosophy based on the Hermetic Qabalah and personal development through study and awareness of the four classical elements, as well as the basics of astrology, tarot divination, and geomancy. The Second or Inner Order, the Rosae Rubeae et Aureae Crucis, taught magic, including scrying, astral travel, and alchemy.

==== Aleister Crowley ====
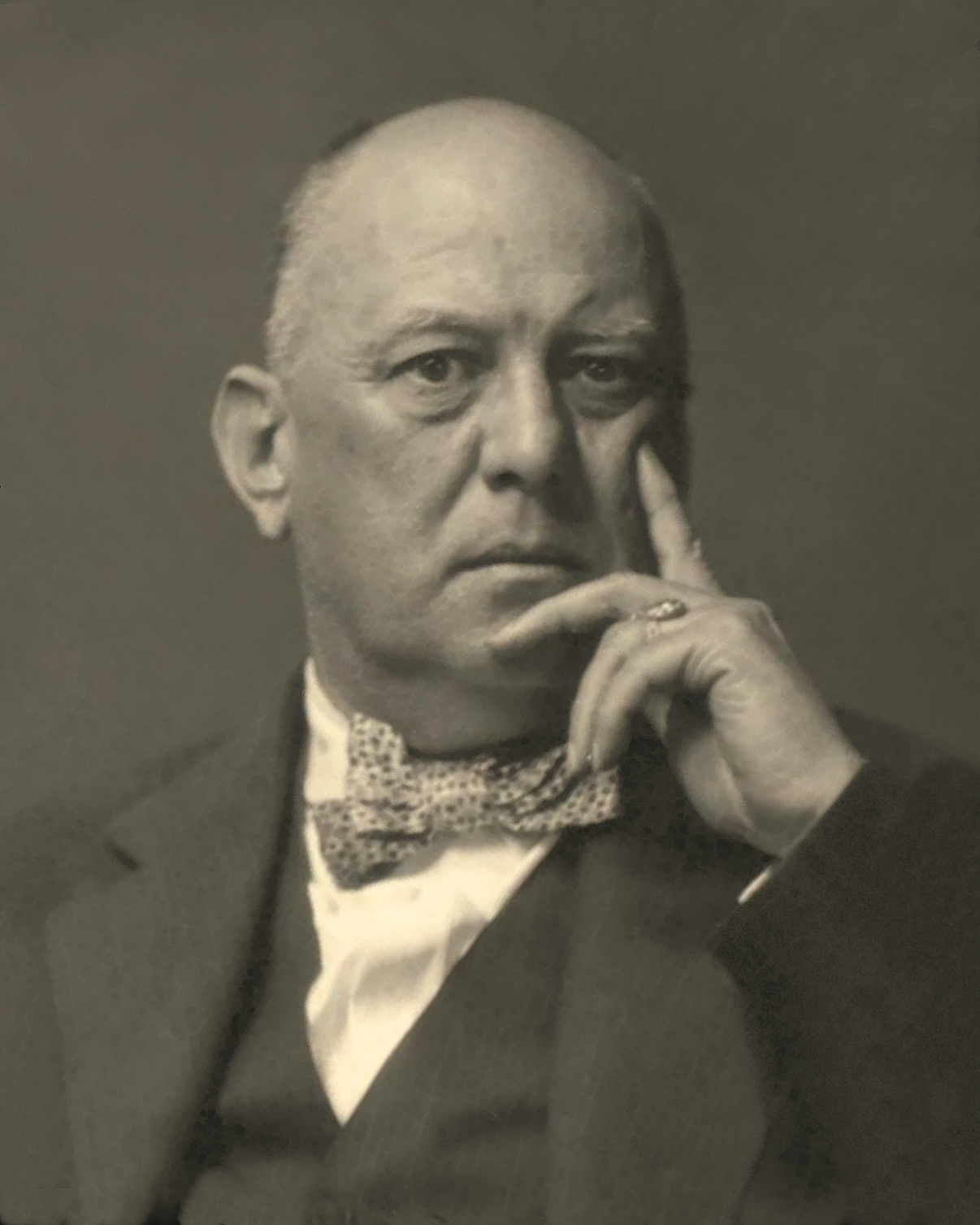
Aleister Crowley, c. 1912

English author and occultist Aleister Crowley (1875–1947) wrote about magical practices and theory, including those of theurgy ("high magic") and goetia ("low magic"). In The Book of the Law and The Vision and the Voice, the Aramaic magical formula Abracadabra was changed to Abrahadabra, which he called the new formula of the Aeon of Horus. He also famously spelled magic in the archaic manner, as 'magick', to differentiate "the true science of the Magi from all its counterfeits." He also stated that "The spirits of the Goetia are portions of the human brain."

His book Magick, Liber ABA, Book 4, is a lengthy treatise on magic in which he presents his own system of Western occult practice, synthesised from many sources, including Yoga, Hermeticism, medieval grimoires, contemporary magical theories from writers like Eliphas Levi and Helena Blavatsky, and his own original contributions. It consists of four parts: Mysticism, Magick (Elementary Theory), Magick in Theory and Practice, and ΘΕΛΗΜΑ—the Law (The Equinox of The Gods). It also includes numerous appendices presenting many rituals and explicatory papers.

==== Dion Fortune ====
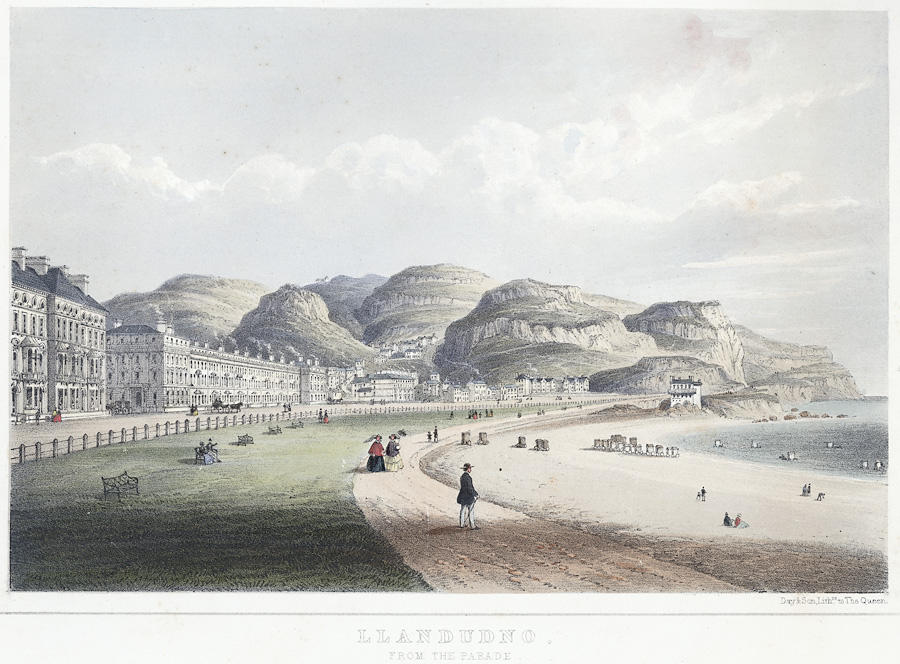
An illustration of Fortune's hometown, Llandudno, in 1860

Dion Fortune (1890–1946) was a Welsh occultist, ceremonial magician, novelist and author. She was a co-founder of the Fraternity of the Inner Light, an occult organisation that promoted philosophies which she claimed had been taught to her by spiritual entities known as the Ascended Masters. A prolific writer, she produced a large number of articles and books on her occult ideas and also authored seven novels, several of which expound occult themes.

Fortune was a ceremonial magician. The magical principles on which her Fraternity was based were adopted from the late nineteenth century Hermetic Order of the Golden Dawn, with other influences coming from Theosophy and Christian Science. The magical ceremonies performed by Fortune's Fraternity were placed into two categories: initiations, in which the candidate was introduced to magical forces, and evocation, in which these forces were manipulated for a given purpose.

The Fraternity's rituals at their Bayswater temple were carried out under a dim light, as Fortune believed that bright light disperses etheric forces. An altar was placed in the centre of a room, with the colours of the altar-cloth and the symbols on the altar varying according to the ceremony being performed. A light was placed on the altar while incense, usually frankincense, was burned. The senior officers sat in a row along the eastern end of the room, while officers—who were believed to be channels for cosmic forces—were positioned at various positions on the floor. The lodge was opened by walking around the room in a circle chanting, with the intent of building a psychic force up as a wall. Next, the cosmic entities would be invoked, with the members believing that these entities would manifest in astral form and interact with the chosen officers.

Fortune was particularly concerned with the issue of sex. She believed that this erotic attraction between men and women could be harnessed for use in magic. She urged her followers to be naked under their robes when carrying out magical rituals, for this would increase the creative sexual tension between the men and women present. Although sex features in her novels, it is never described in graphic detail. The scholar Andrew Radford noted that Fortune's "reactionary and highly heteronormative" view of "sacralised sexuality" should be seen as part of a wider tradition among esoteric currents, going back to the ideas of Emanuel Swedenborg and Andrew Jackson Davis and also being found in the work of occultists like Paschal Beverly Randolph and Ida Craddock.

The religious studies scholar Hugh Urban noted that Fortune was "one of the key links" between early twentieth-century ceremonial magic and the developing Pagan religion of Wicca. Similarly, the Wiccan high priestess Vivianne Crowley characterised Fortune as a "proto-Pagan". The scholar and esotericist Nevill Drury stated that Fortune "in many ways anticipated feminist ideas in contemporary Wicca", particularly through her belief that all goddesses were a manifestation of a single Great Goddess. Graf agreed, adding that Fortune's works found "resonance" in the work of the later feminist Wiccan Starhawk, and in particular in the latter's 1979 book, The Spiral Dance.

In researching ceremonial magic orders and other esoteric groups active in the London area during the 1980s, Luhrmann found that within them, Fortune's novels were treated as "fictionalized ideals" and that they were recommended to newcomers as the best way to understand magic. The Pagan studies scholar Joanne Pearson added that Fortune's books, and in particular the novels The Sea Priestess and Moon Magic, were owned by many Wiccans and other Pagans. The religious studies scholar Graham Harvey compared The Sea Priestess to the Wiccan Gerald Gardner's 1949 novel High Magic's Aid, stating that while neither were "great literature", they "evoke Paganism better than later more didactic works".

Fortune's priestesses were an influence on the characters of Marion Zimmer Bradley's The Mists of Avalon, and her ideas were adopted as the basis for the Aquarian Order of the Restoration, a ceremonial magic group led by Bradley. Her works also influenced Bradley's collaborator and fellow Order member Diana Paxson. As of 2007, Fortune's latter three novels remained in print and had a wide readership.

==== Jack Parsons ====
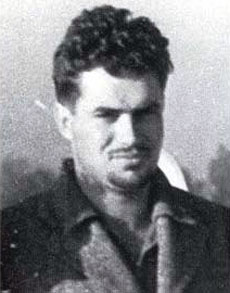
Parsons in 1941

John Whiteside Parsons (1914–1952) was an American rocket engineer, chemist, and Thelemite occultist. Parsons converted to Thelema, the new religious movement founded by the English occultist Aleister Crowley. Together with his first wife, Helen Northrup, Parsons joined the Agape Lodge, the Californian branch of Ordo Templi Orientis (O.T.O.) in 1941. At Crowley's bidding, Parsons replaced Wilfred Talbot Smith as its leader in 1942 and ran the Lodge from his mansion on Orange Grove Boulevard.

Parsons identified four obstacles that prevented humans from achieving and performing their true will, all of which he connected with fear: the fear of incompetence, the fear of the opinion of others, the fear of hurting others, and the fear of insecurity. He insisted that these must be overcome, writing that "The Will must be freed of its fetters. The ruthless examination and destruction of taboos, complexes, frustrations, dislikes, fears and disgusts hostile to the Will is essential to progress."

In 1945, Parsons separated from Helen, after having an affair with her sister Sara; when Sara left him for L. Ron Hubbard, Parsons conducted the Babalon Working, a series of rituals intended to invoke the Thelemic goddess Babalon on Earth. The Babalon Working was a series of magic ceremonies or rituals performed from January to March 1946 by Parsons and Scientology founder L. Ron Hubbard. (Note: Urban (2011), p. 39–42: "The aim of Parson's 'Babalon Working' was first to identify a female partner who would serve as his partner in esoteric sexual rituals; the partner would then become the vessel for the 'magical child' or 'moonchild,' a supernatural offspring that would be the embodiment of ultimate power... According to Parson's account of March 2–3, 1946, Hubbard channeled the voice of Babalon, speaking as the beautiful but terrible lady...") This ritual was essentially designed to manifest an individual incarnation of the archetypal divine feminine called Babalon. The project was based on the ideas of Crowley, and his description of a similar project in his 1917 novel Moonchild. (Note: Urban (2006), pp. 135–137: "The ultimate goal of these operations, carried out during February and March 1946, was to give birth to the magical being, or 'moonchild,' described in Crowley's works. Using the powerful energy of IX degree Sex Magick, the rites were intended to open a doorway through which the goddess Babalon herself might appear in human form.")

When Parsons declared that the first of the series of rituals was complete and successful, he almost immediately met Marjorie Cameron in his own home, and regarded her as the elemental that he and Hubbard had called through the ritual. Soon Parsons began the next stage of the series, an attempt to conceive a child through sex magic workings. Although no child was conceived, this did not affect the result of the ritual to that point. Parsons and Cameron, who Parsons now regarded as the Scarlet Woman, Babalon, called forth by the ritual, soon married.

The rituals performed drew largely upon rituals and sex magic described by Crowley. Crowley was in correspondence with Parsons during the course of the Babalon Working, and warned Parsons of his potential overreactions to the magic he was performing, while simultaneously deriding Parsons' work to others.

A brief text entitled Liber 49, self-referenced within the text as The Book of Babalon, was written by Jack Parsons as a transmission from the goddess or force called 'Babalon' received by him during the Babalon Working. Parsons wrote that Liber 49 constituted a fourth chapter of Crowley's Liber AL Vel Legis (The Book of the Law), the holy text of Thelema.

==== Phyllis Seckler ====
Phyllis Seckler (1917–2004), also known as 'Soror Meral', was a ninth degree (IX°) member of the Sovereign Sanctuary of the Gnosis of Ordo Templi Orientis (O.T.O.), and a lineage holder in the A∴A∴ tradition. She was a student of Jane Wolfe, herself a student of Aleister Crowley.

Sekler was a member of O.T.O. Agape Lodge, the only working Lodge of the O.T.O. at the time of Aleister Crowley's death. Seckler was also instrumental in preserving important parts of Crowley's literary heritage, typing parts of his Confessions, and the complete texts of The Vision and the Voice and Magick Without Tears during the 1950s. Seckler was also instrumental in re-activing the O.T.O. with Grady Louis McMurtry, during the early-mid 1970s, following the death of Crowley's appointed successor, Karl Germer.

Seckler continued her lifelong work with the A∴A∴, founding the College of Thelema and co-founding (with James A. Eshelman) the Temple of Thelema, and later warranting the formation of the Temple of the Silver Star. Seeking to guide her students to an understanding of the Law of Thelema, especially deeper understanding of oneself and of one's magical will, Sekler published the bi-annual Thelemic journal In the Continuum which featured her essays on Thelema and initiation as well as instructional articles for the students of the A.:.A.:., illustrations and essays which help to clarify some of Crowley's thoughts and aid in the understanding of Thelemic principles expressed in Liber AL. Printed for 20 years from 1976 through 1996, In the Continuum also published rare works by Aleister Crowley which at the time were out of print or hard to find.

Seckler served as a master of 418 Lodge of O.T.O. in California from its inception in 1979 until her death.

==== Kenneth Grant ====
Kenneth Grant (1924–2011) was an English ceremonial magician and advocate of the Thelemic religion. A poet, novelist, and writer, he founded his own Thelemic organisation, the Typhonian Ordo Templi Orientis—later renamed the Typhonian Order—with his wife Steffi Grant.

Grant was fascinated by the work of the occultist Aleister Crowley, having read a number of his books. Eager to meet Crowley, Grant wrote letters to Crowley's publishers, asking that they pass his letters on to Crowley himself. These eventually resulted in the first meeting between the two, in autumn 1944, at the Bell Inn in Buckinghamshire. After several further meetings and an exchange of letters, Grant agreed to work for Crowley as his secretary and personal assistant. Now living in relative poverty, Crowley was unable to pay Grant for his services in money, instead paying him in magical instruction.

In March 1945, Grant moved into a lodge cottage in the grounds of Netherwood, a Sussex boarding house where Crowley was living. He continued living there with Crowley for several months, dealing with the old man's correspondences and needs. In turn, he was allowed to read from Crowley's extensive library on occult subjects, and performed ceremonial magic workings with him, becoming a high initiate of Crowley's magical group, Ordo Templi Orientis (O.T.O.). Crowley saw Grant as a potential leader of O.T.O. in the UK, writing in his diary, "value of Grant. If I die or go to the USA, there must be a trained man to take care of the English O.T.O."

Grant drew eclectically on a range of sources in devising his teachings. Although based in Thelema, Grant's Typhonian tradition has been described as "a bricolage of occultism, Neo-Vedanta, Hindu tantra, Western sexual magic, Surrealism, ufology and Lovecraftian gnosis". According to Djurdjevic, Grant's writing style is notorious for being opaque with "verbal and conceptual labyrinths". The historian of religion Manon Hedenborg White noted that "Grant's writings to not lend themselves easily to systematization". She added that he "deliberately employs cryptic or circuitous modes of argumentation", and lacks clear boundaries between fact and fiction.

Grant promoted what he termed the Typhonian or Draconian tradition of magic, and wrote that Thelema was only a recent manifestation of this wider tradition. In his books, he portrayed the Typhonian tradition as the world's oldest spiritual tradition, writing that it had ancient roots in Africa. The religious studies scholar Gordan Djurdjevic noted that Grant's historical claims regarding Typhonian history were "at best highly speculative" and lacked any supporting evidence, however he suggested that Grant may never have intended these claims to be taken literally.

Grant adopted a perennialist interpretation of the history of religion. Grant's wrote that Indian spiritual traditions like Tantra and Yoga correlate to Western esoteric traditions, and that both stem from a core, ancient source, has parallels in the perennial philosophy promoted by the Traditionalist School of esotericists. He believed that by mastering magic, one masters this illusory universe, gaining personal liberation and recognising that only the Self really exists. Doing so, according to Grant, leads to the discovery of one's true will, the central focus of Thelema.

Grant further wrote that the realm of the Self was known as "the Mauve Zone", and that it could be reached while in a state of deep sleep, where it has the symbolic appearance of a swamp. He also believed that the reality of consciousness, which he deemed the only true reality, was formless and thus presented as a void, although he also taught that it was symbolised by the Hindu goddess Kali and the Thelemic goddess Nuit.

Grant's views on sex magic drew heavily on the importance of sexual dimorphism among humans and the subsequent differentiation of gender roles. Grant taught that the true secret of sex magic were bodily secretions, the most important of which was a woman's menstrual blood. In this he differed from Crowley, who viewed semen as the most important genital secretion. Grant referred to female sexual secretions as kalas, a term adopted from Sanskrit. He thought that because women have kalas, they have oracular and visionary powers. The magical uses of female genital secretions are a recurring theme in Grant's writings.

==== James Lees ====
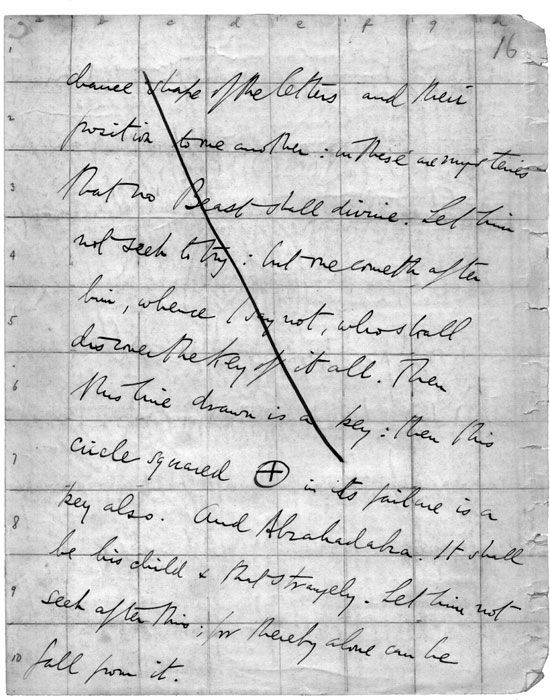
The mysterious 'grid' page of Liber AL's manuscript. "for in the chance shape of the letters and their position to one another: in these are mysteries that no Beast shall divine. ... Then this line drawn is a key: then this circle squared in its failure is a key also. And Abrahadabra."

James Lees (August 22, 1939 – 2015) was an English magician known for discovering the system he called English Qaballa.

Lees was born in Bolton, Lancashire. He established a career as an analytic chemist. In his search for truth, he also studied psychology. Not finding the answers he wanted from science, he turned to the study of astrology, even making a living for a time as a horary astrologer.

Still resolved to discover further answers, Lees decided to study Kabbalah and the Tree of Life. From here he proceeded to experiment with invocations from the Key of Solomon. Satisfied with the results, he proceeded to perform the 18-month working described in The Book of Abramelin by means of the Bornless Ritual. Having successfully invoked his Holy Guardian Angel, he turned his attention to ascending the 'Middle Pillar' of the Tree of Life, culminating with an experience known as crossing the abyss.

Then, in November 1976, Lees discovered the "order & value of the English Alphabet." Following this discovery, Lees founded the O∴A∴A∴ in order to assist others in the pursuit of their own spiritual paths. The first public report of the system known as English Qaballa (EQ) was published in 1979 by Ray Sherwin in an editorial in the final issue of his journal, The New Equinox. Lees subsequently assumed the role of publisher of The New Equinox and, starting in 1981, published additional material about the EQ system over the course of five issues of the journal, extending into 1982.

In 1904, Aleister Crowley wrote out the text of the foundational document of his world-view, known as Liber AL vel Legis, The Book of the Law. In this text was the injunction found at verse 2:55; "Thou shalt obtain the order & value of the English Alphabet, thou shalt find new symbols to attribute them unto" which was understood by Crowley as referring to an English Qabalah yet to be developed or revealed.

The "order & value" discovered by James Lees lays the letters out on the grid superimposed on the page of manuscript of Liber AL on which this verse (Ch. III, v. 47) appears (sheet 16 of Chapter III). Also appearing on this page are a diagonal line and a circled cross. The Book of the Law states that the book should only be printed with Crowley's hand-written version included, suggesting that there are mysteries in the "chance shape of the letters and their position to one another" of Crowley's handwriting. Whichever top-left to bottom-right diagonal is read the magickal order of the letters is obtained.

Little further material on English Qaballa was published until the appearance of Jake Stratton-Kent's book, The Serpent Tongue: Liber 187, in 2011. This was followed in 2016 by The Magickal Language of the Book of the Law: An English Qaballa Primer by Cath Thompson. The discovery, exploration, and continuing research and development of the system up to 2010, by James Lees and members of his group in England, are detailed in her 2018 book, All This and a Book.

==== Nema Andahadna ====
Nema Andahadna (1939–2018) practiced and wrote about magic (magical working, as defined by Aleister Crowley) for over thirty years. In 1974, she channelled a short book called Liber Pennae Praenumbra.

From her experience with Thelemic magic, she developed her own system of magic called "Maat Magick" which has the aim of transforming the human race. In 1979, she co-founded the Horus-Maat Lodge. The Lodge and her ideas have been featured in the writings of Kenneth Grant.

Her writings have appeared in many publications, including the Cincinnati Journal of Ceremonial Magick, Aeon, and Starfire. According to Donald Michael Kraig:

Nema has been one of the most influential occultists of the last quarter century although most occultists have never read her works. What Nema has done is influence those who have been writers and teachers. They, in turn, influenced the rest of us.
