= Methods of divination =

Methods of divination can be found around the world, and many cultures practice the same methods under different names. During the Middle Ages, scholars coined terms for many of these methods—some of which had hitherto been unnamed—in Medieval Latin, very often utilizing the suffix -mantia when the art seemed more mystical (ultimately from Ancient Greek μαντεία, manteía, 'prophecy' or 'the power to prophesy') and the suffix -scopia when the art seemed more scientific (ultimately from Greek σκοπεῖν, skopeîn, 'to observe'). Names like drimimantia, nigromantia, and horoscopia arose, along with phrenology and physiognomy.

Some forms of divination are much older than the Middle Ages, like haruspication, while others such as coffee-based tasseomancy originated in the 20th and 21st centuries.

The chapter "How Panurge consulteth with Herr Trippa" of Gargantua and Pantagruel, a parody on occult treatises of Heinrich Cornelius Agrippa, contains a list of over two dozen "mancies", described as "common knowledge".

== A ==
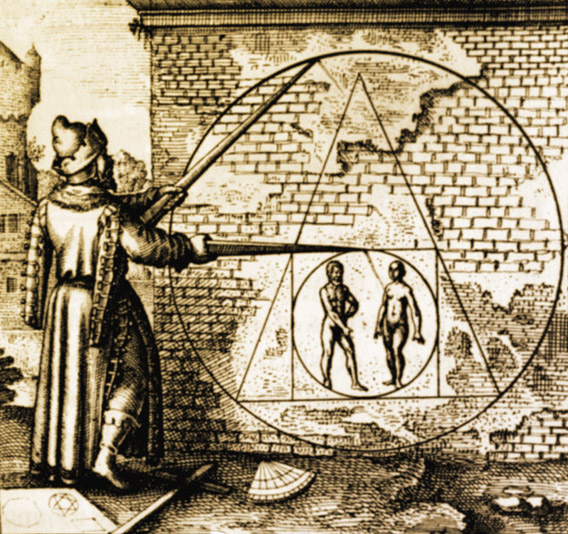
An arithmancer from Atalanta Fugiens (1618), by Michael Maier

- abacomancy /ˈæbəkoʊmænsi/ (also amathomancy): by dust (Hebrew ’ābāq, 'dust' + Greek manteía, 'prophecy')
- acultomancy /əˈkʌltoʊmænsi/ (also acutomancy): by needles (from acutomancy below, influenced by Latin acus, 'needle', or acūleus, 'prickle, thorn')
- acutomancy /əˈkjuːtoʊmænsi/ → see acultomancy (Latin acus [acut-], 'needle' + Greek manteía, 'prophecy')
- adromancy /ˈædroʊmænsi/ → see alomancy (from idromancy below, influenced by alomancy)
- adryomancy→ see hydromancy (metathesis of hydromancy)
- aeromancy /ˈɛəroʊmænsi/: by atmospheric conditions (Greek āēr, 'air' + manteía, 'prophecy')
- agalmatomancy /əˈɡɔːlmətoʊmænsi/: by statues (Greek ágalma [agálmatos], 'statue' + manteía, 'prophecy')
- aichmomancy /ˈɛkmoʊmænsi/: by sharp objects (Greek aikhmē, 'spearhead' + manteía, 'prophecy')
- ailuromancy/aeluromancy → see theriomancy
- aiomancy: By artificial intelligence
- alectormancy/alectromancy /əˈlɛktroʊmænsi/: by rooster sacrifice (Greek alektor, 'rooster' + manteía, 'prophecy')
- alectryomancy/alectoromancy: by rooster divination → see theriomancy
- aleuromancy¹ /əˈljʊəroʊmænsi/: by flour; see also chartomancy (Greek áleuron, 'meal' + manteía, 'prophecy')
- alomancy/Halomancy /ˈæloʊmænsi/ (also adromancy): by salt (Greek háls, 'salt' + manteía, 'prophecy')
- alphitomancy/ˈælfɪtoʊmænsi/: by barley (Greek alphis [alphit-], 'barley' + manteía, 'prophecy')
- alveromancy /ælˈvɪəroʊmænsi/: by sounds
- amathomancy /ˈæməθoʊmænsi/ → see abacomancy by sand (Greek amathos, 'sandy soil' + manteía, 'prophecy')
- ambulomancy /ˈæmbjʊloʊmænsi/: by walking (Latin ambulāre, 'to walk' + Greek manteía, 'prophecy')
- amniomancy /ˈæmnioʊmænsi/: by placenta (Greek amniōn, 'amnion' + manteía, 'prophecy')
- anemoscopy/anemomancy /ˌænɪˈmɒskoʊpi/: by wind (Greek anemos, 'wind' + -skopiā, 'observation')
- anthomancy /ˈænθoʊmænsi/: by flowers (Greek anthos, 'flower' + manteía, 'prophecy')
- anthracomancy /ˈænθrəkoʊmænsi/: by burning coals (Greek anthrax [anthrak-], 'charcoal' + manteía, 'prophecy')
- anthropomancy /ænˈθrɒpoʊmænsi/: by human sacrifice (Greek anthrōpos, 'human being' + manteía, 'prophecy')
- anthroposcopy /ænθroʊˈpɒskoʊpi/: by physical appearance (Greek anthrōpos, 'human being' + -skopiā, 'observation')
- apantomancy /əˈpæntoʊmænsi/: by chance encounters with animals (Greek apantein, 'to encounter' + manteía, 'prophecy')
- arachnomancy /əˈræknoʊmænsi/: by spiders (Greek arakhnē, 'spider' + manteía, 'prophecy')
- archeomancy/archaeomancy /ˈɑːrkioʊmænsi/: by sacred relics (Greek arkhaios, 'ancient' + manteía, 'prophecy')
- ariolation /ˌærioʊˈleɪʃən/: by altars (Latin ariolus, hariolus, 'prophet')
- arithmancy: assigning numerical value to a word or phrase
- armomancy /ˈɑːrmoʊmænsi/: by one's own shoulders (Latin armus, 'shoulder' + Greek manteía, 'prophecy')
- årsgång, archaic form of Swedish divination
- aruspicina: study of entrails
- aspidomancy /ˈæspɪdoʊmænsi/: by sitting in a drawn circle or on a shield (Greek aspis [aspid-], 'shield' + manteía, 'prophecy')
- astragalomancy/astragalamancy → see cleromancy
- astragyromancy → see cleromancy (from astragalomancy above, perhaps influenced by Greek guros, 'spiral, circle', and therefore vertebra)
- astrapomancy /ˈæstrəpoʊmænsi/: by lightning (Greek astrapē, 'lightning flash' + manteía, 'prophecy')
- astrology/astromancy/ /əˈstrɒloʊdʒi/: by celestial bodies (Greek astron, 'star' + -logiā, 'study'). This method was widespread in medieval period, particularly in Mesopotamia.
- augury /ˈɔːɡjʊəri/ → see theriomancy
- auramancy /ˈɔːrəmænsi/: by auras (Greek aurā, 'breath' + manteía, 'prophecy')
- auspicy/auspication → see theriomancy (Latin avis, 'bird' + specere, 'to look at')
- austromancy → see theriomancy /ˈɔːstroʊmænsi/: by wind (Latin auster, 'south wind' + Greek manteía, 'prophecy')
- avimancy → see orniscopy (Latin avis, 'bird' + Greek manteía, 'prophecy')
- axiomancy/axinomancy /ˈæksioʊmænsi/: by axes (Latin axis, 'axis' + manteía, 'prophecy')

== B ==
- batraquomancy/batrachomancy /bəˈtrækoʊmænsi/: by frogs (Greek batrakhos, 'frog' + manteía, 'prophecy')
- belomancy/bolomancy /ˈbɛloʊmænsi/: by arrows (from bolomancy below, influenced by Greek belemnon, 'javelin', or belonē, 'needle')
- bibliomancy → see chartomancy
- biorhythmic divination: by biorhythms
- bletonism/bletonomancy /ˈblɛtənɪzəm/: by water current (named for Monsieur Bleton, a French bletonist)
- bolomancy /ˈbɒloʊmænsi/ → see belomancy (Greek bolē, 'arrow' + manteía, 'prophecy')
- bone-throwing: the tossing of pieces of bone or wood, practiced by various cultures
- botanomancy /boʊˈtænoʊmænsi/: by burning pieces of plants, documented with burning vervain and briar. (Greek botanē, 'flora' + manteía, 'prophecy')
- brizomancy → see oneiromancy (Greek brizein, 'to be sleepy' + manteía, 'prophecy')
- brontomancy/brontoscopy /ˈbrɒntoʊmænsi/: by thunder (Greek brontē, 'thunder' + manteía, 'prophecy')
- bumpology /bʌmˈpɒloʊdʒi/: by bumps on the skin (English bump + Greek -logiā, 'study')

== C ==
- cabala → see kabbalah
- canomancy /ˈkænoʊmænsi/ or /ˈkeɪnoʊmænsi/: by dogs (Latin canis, 'dog' + Greek manteía, 'prophecy')
- capnomancy /ˈkæpnoʊmænsi/: by smoke (Greek kapnos, 'smoke' + manteía, 'prophecy')
  - libanomancy /laɪˈbænoʊmænsi/: by smoke or ash from incense (Greek libanos, 'frankincense' + manteía, 'prophecy')
- carromancy /ˈkæroʊmænsi/: by melting wax (Greek karrō, 'of wax' + manteía, 'prophecy')
- cartopedy → see somatomancy (Latin carta, 'papyrus paper' + pēs [pēd-], 'foot')
- cartomancy → see chartomancy
- catoptromancy/captromancy → see scrying
- causimancy/causimomancy /ˈkɔːzɪmænsi/: by burning (Greek kaiein [kaus-], 'to burn' + manteía, 'prophecy')
- cephalomancy → see somatomancy
- cephaleonomancy/cephalonomancy/ˌsɛfəliˈɒnoʊmænsi/: by boiling a donkey's head (Greek kephalaion, 'head' [with meaning influenced by Greek onos, 'donkey'] + manteía, 'prophecy')
- ceraunoscopy /ˌsɛrəˈnɒskoʊpi/: by thunder and lightning (Greek keraunos, 'thunderbolt' + -skopiā, 'observation')
- ceromancy/ceroscopy /ˈsɛroʊmænsi/: by dripping wax in water (Greek kēros, 'wax' + manteía, 'prophecy')
- chalcomancy: by striking gongs or copper bowls (Greek khalkos, 'copper' + manteía, 'prophecy')
- chaomancy /ˈkeɪoʊmænsi/: by aerial visions (Greek khaos, 'primordial space' + manteía, 'prophecy')
- chartomancy /ˈkɑːrtoʊmænsi/: by things on paper (Greek khartēs, 'papyrus paper' + manteía, 'prophecy')
  - cartomancy /ˈkɑːrtoʊmænsi/: by cards (Latin carta, 'papyrus paper' + Greek manteía, 'prophecy')
    - taromancy/tarotmancy /ˈtæroʊmænsi/: by tarot (English tarot + Greek manteía, 'prophecy')
    - Parrot astrology: by parrots picking cards
  - stichomancy /ˈstɪkoʊmænsi/: by books or lines (Greek stikhos, 'line of verse' + manteía, 'prophecy')
    - aleuromancy² /əˈljʊəroʊmænsi/: by fortune cookies (of the same origin as aleuromancy¹)
    - bibliomancy /ˈbɪblioʊmænsi/: by the Bible (Greek biblion, 'book' + manteía, 'prophecy')
    - stoicheomancy/stoichomancy: by the Iliad and the Odyssey or the Aeneid (Greek stoikheion, 'element' + manteía, 'prophecy'; to the Greeks, Homer's writings were held in similar esteem to the Christian Bible or the Muslim Quran, as were Virgil's writings to the Romans, making them the basic — or elementary — reading material in each culture)
- cheiromancy/chiromancy→ see somatomancy
- cheirognomy/chirognomy → see somatomancy
- chien tung → see kau cim
- choriomancy /ˈkɒrioʊmænsi/: by pig bladders (Greek khorion, 'placenta' + mantiea, 'prophecy')
- chresmomancy /ˈkrɛsmoʊmænsi/: by the ravings of lunatics (Greek khrēsmos, 'oracular utterance', chresm + manteía, 'prophecy')
- chronomancy /ˈkrɒnoʊmænsi/: by apt occasion (Greek khronos, 'time' + manteía, 'prophecy')
- cineromancy/ceneromancy → see spodomancy /ˈsɪnəroʊmænsi/ (Latin cinis [ciner-], 'ashes' + Greek manteía, 'prophecy')
- clamancy (see also Fāl-gūsh): by random shouts and cries heard in crowds, at night, etc. (Latin clāmāre, 'to cry out' + Greek manteía, 'prophecy')
- cledonism/cledonomancy /ˈklɛdoʊnɪzəm/: by chance events or overheard words (Greek klēdon, 'rumor')
- cleidomancy/clidomancy /ˈklaɪdoʊmænsi/: by keys (Greek kleis [kleid-], 'key' + manteía, 'prophecy')
- cleromancy /ˈklɛroʊmænsi/: by casting (Greek klēros, 'lot' + manteía, 'prophecy')
  - astragalomancy/astragalamancy /əˈstræɡəloʊmænsi/ (also cubomancy): by dice (Greek astragalos, 'vertebra' + manteía, 'prophecy')
  - domino divination: by dominoes
  - favomancy /ˈfævoʊmænsi/: by beans (Latin faba, 'bean' + Greek manteía, 'prophecy')
  - Ogham casting: by Ogham letters
  - runecasting/runic divination
- cometomancy /koʊˈmɛtoʊmænsi/: by comet tails (Greek komētēs, 'comet' + manteía, 'prophecy')
- colormancy/coloromancy: by colors (English color + Greek manteía, 'prophecy')
- conchomancy /ˈkɒŋkoʊmænsi/: by shells (Greek konkhē, 'mussel' + manteía, 'prophecy')
- cosquinomancy/coscinomancy /koʊˈsɪnoʊmænsi/: by hanging sieves (Greek koskinōn, 'sieve' + manteía, 'prophecy')
- cottabomancy/cottobomancy /ˈkɒtəboʊmænsi/: by wine in a brass bowl (Greek kottabos, 'cottabus' + manteía, 'prophecy')
- craniognomy /ˌkreɪniˈɒɡnoʊmi/ or /ˌkreɪniˈɒnəmi/ → see somatomancy (Greek krānion, 'skull' + -gnōmoniā, 'interpretation')
- the crawling baby: by a baby's crawling
- crithomancy/critomancy /ˈkrɪθoʊmænsi/: by barley cakes (Greek krithē, 'barley' + manteía, 'prophecy')
- cromnyomancy/cromniomancy /ˈkrɒmnioʊmænsi/: by onion sprouts (alteration of Greek krommuon, 'onion' + manteía, 'prophecy')
- cryptomancy /ˈkrɪptoʊmænsi/: by omens (Greek kruptos, 'hidden' + manteía, 'prophecy')
- cryomancy /ˈkraɪoʊmænsi/: by ice (Greek kryo, 'ice' + manteía, 'prophecy')
- crystal ball gazing → see scrying
- crystal gazing → see scrying
- crystallomancy /ˈkrɪstəloʊmænsi/ → see scrying (Greek krustallos, 'crystal' + manteía, 'prophecy')
- cubomancy /ˈkjuːboʊmænsi/ → see cleromancy (Greek kubos, 'cube' + manteía, 'prophecy')
- cyathomancy /ˈsaɪəθoʊmænsi/: by cups (Greek kuathos, 'cup' + manteía, 'prophecy')
- cybermancy /ˈsaɪbərmænsi/: by computer oracles (English cyber(netics) + Greek manteía, 'prophecy')
- cyclicomancy /ˈsɪklɪkoʊmænsi/: by swirling water in a cup (Greek kuklikos, 'cyclical, circular' + manteía, 'prophecy')
- cyclomancy /ˈsɪkloʊmænsi/ or /ˈsaɪkloʊmænsi/: by wheels (Greek kuklos, 'circle' + manteía, 'prophecy')

== D ==
- dactyliomancy /dækˈtɪlioʊmænsi/: by finger rings (Greek daktulios, 'finger ring' + manteía, 'prophecy')
- dactylomancy /ˈdæktɪloʊmænsi/: by means of finger movements (Greek daktulos, 'finger' + manteía, 'prophecy')
- daphnomancy /ˈdæfnoʊmænsi/: by burning laurel wreaths (Greek daphnē, 'laurel' + manteía, 'prophecy')
- demonomancy /dɪˈmɒnoʊmænsi/: by demons (Greek daimōn, 'divine power' + manteía, 'prophecy')
- dendromancy /ˈdɛndroʊmænsi/: by trees, especially oaks, yews, or mistletoe (Greek dendron, 'tree' + manteía, 'prophecy')
- deuteroscopy /ˌdjuːtəˈrɒskoʊpi/: by second glance or double take (Greek deuteros, 'secondary' + -skopiā, 'observation')
- dictiomancy /ˈdɪkʃoʊmænsi/: by randomly opening a dictionary (English dictio(nary) + Greek manteía, 'prophecy')
- divining → see dowsing
- djubed→ see scrying
- dōbutsu uranai: by animal horoscope (Japanese dōbutsu, 'animal' + uranai, 'prognostication')
- domino divination → see cleromancy
- dowsing (also divining, water witching): by a divining rod (of unknown origin)
- dracomancy /ˈdrækoʊmænsi/: by dragons (Greek drakōn, 'dragon' + manteía, 'prophecy')
- dream interpretation
- dream questions: by dreaming
- dririmancy/driromancy /ˈdrɪərɪmænsi/: by dripping blood (alteration of drimimancy, influenced by Middle English drir, 'blood'). Compare hemotomancy.
- drimimancy/drymimancy /ˈdrɪmɪmænsi/: by bodily fluids (Greek drimus, 'pungent' + manteía, 'prophecy')

== E ==
- electromancy: by lightning and electricity (Greek ilektros 'electric' + manteía 'prophecy')
- eleomancy/elaeomancy: by oil (Greek elaion, olive 'oil' + manteía, 'prophecy')
- emonomancy → see demonomancy
- empirimancy: by experiment/experience
- empyromancy /ɛmˈpaɪəroʊmænsi/: by burning (Greek empurios, 'fiery' + manteía, 'prophecy')
- encromancy: by oil ink stains (Greek elaion 'oil ink' + manteía 'prophecy')
- enochian chess: by playing a four·handed variant of the game
- enoptromancy /ɛˈnɒptroʊmænsi/ → see scrying (Greek enoptron, 'looking glass' + manteía, 'prophecy')
- enthusiasm: speeches by those supposed to be possessed by a divine spirit
- entomomancy/entomancy: by insects (Greek entomon, 'insect' + manteía, 'prophecy')
- eromancy /ˈɛroʊmænsi/: by water vessels exposed to air (Greek āēr, 'air' + manteía, 'prophecy') — cf. aeromancy
- extispicy/extispication /ɛkˈstɪspɪsi/: by the remains of sacrificed animals (Latin exta, 'entrails' + specere, 'to look at')

== F ==
- favomancy → see cleromancy
- felidomancy → see theriomancy (Latin fēlēs [fēlid-], 'cat' + Greek manteía, 'prophecy')
- floriography/floromancy /ˌflɔːriˈɒɡrəfi/: by flowers' feelings (Latin flōs [flōr-], 'flower' + Greek -graphiā, 'representation')
- fractomancy /ˈfræktoʊmænsi/: by fractals (English fract(al) + Greek manteía, 'prophecy')
- fructomancy/fructimancy: by fruit (Latin frūctus, 'fruit' + Greek manteía, 'prophecy')
- Futomani is the Shinto tradition of divining from the shoulder blade bone of a sacred deer.

== G ==
- galvanoscopy /ˌɡælvəˈnɒskoʊpi/: by galvanism (English galvan(ism) + Greek -skopiā, 'observation')
- gastromancy¹ → see scrying
- gastromancy² /ˈɡæstroʊmænsi/: by guttural sounds (Greek gastēr, 'belly' + manteía, 'prophecy')
- geomancy /ˈdʒiːoʊmænsi/: by earth (Greek gaîa|gê, 'earth' + manteía, 'prophecy')
- geloscopy /dʒɪˈlɒskoʊpi/: by laughter (Greek gelōs, 'laughter' + -skopiā, 'observation')
- gematria: by the Hebrew alphabet (Greek gē, 'earth' + -metriā, 'measurement')
- genethlialogy: by birth dates (Greek genethlios, 'birthday' + -logiā, 'study')
- grammomancy /ˈɡræmoʊmænsi/: by writing individual letters (Greek gramma, 'letter' + manteía, 'prophecy')
- graphology /ɡræˈfɒloʊdʒi/ (also graptomancy): by studying handwriting (Greek graphē, 'writing' + -logiā, 'study')
- graptomancy /ˈɡræptoʊmænsi/ → see graphology (Greek graptos, 'written' + manteía, 'prophecy')
- gyromancy /ˈdʒaɪəroʊmænsi/: by dizziness (Greek gūros, 'spiral' + manteía, 'prophecy')

== H ==
- hagiomancy: by saints (Greek hagios, 'holy' + manteía, 'prophecy')
- halomancy /ˈhæloʊmænsi/ → see alomancy
- hakata: by bones or dice
- haruspicy/haruspication /həˈrʌspɪsi/ → see hepatoscopy (Latin haru-, 'entrails' + specere, 'to look at')
- heliomancy: by the Sun (Greek helio, 'sun' + manteía, 'prophecy')
- hematomancy/haematomancy /ˈhɛmətoʊmænsi, ˈhiː-/: by blood (Greek haima [haimat-], 'blood' + manteía, 'prophecy')
- hepatoscopy/hepatomancy /ˈhɛpətoʊmænsi/ (also haruspicy, haruspication): by liver (Greek hēpar [hēpat-], 'liver' + -skopiā, 'observation')
- hieromancy/hieroscopy /ˈhaɪəroʊmænsi/: by studying sacrifices' entrails (Greek hieros, 'holy' + manteía, 'prophecy')
- hippomancy → see theriomancy
- horoscopy /hoʊˈrɒskoʊpi/: aspect of the Stars at nativity (Greek hōrā, 'season' + -skopiā, 'observation')
- hydatomancy: by rainwater (Greek hudatis, 'raindrop' + manteía, 'prophecy')
- hydromancy/hydroscopy → see scrying
- hyomancy: by wild hogs (Greek hūs, 'swine' + manteía, 'prophecy')
- hypnomancy /ˈhɪpnoʊmænsi/: by sleep (Greek hupnos, 'sleep' + manteía, 'prophecy')

== I ==
- I Ching divination: by yarrow stalks or coins
- ichnomancy /ˈɪknoʊmænsi/: by footprints (Greek ikhnos, 'track' + manteía, 'prophecy')
- ichthyomancy → see theriomancy
- iconomancy /aɪˈkɒnoʊmænsi/: by icons (Greek eikōn, 'image' + manteía, 'prophecy')
- idolomancy /aɪˈdɒloʊmænsi/: by idols (Greek eidōlon, 'phantom' + manteía, 'prophecy')
- idromancy → see alomancy (Greek idrōs, 'sweat' + manteía, 'prophecy')
- ifá: geomancy patterns generated with palm nuts, opele, cowrie shells, etc. that refer to Ifa divination texts; a collection of Odu Ifa verses
- iridology: by eye color (Greek īris [īrid-], 'iris' + -logiā, 'study')
- isopsephy: by numbers and letters (Greek īsos, 'equal' + psephos, 'pebble')

== J ==
- Jyotish: Vedic system of astrology

== K ==
- kabbalah/qabalah/cabala: by the Kabbalah (Hebrew qabbālâ, 'tradition')
- kau cim: by bamboo
- kayu ura: by rice gruel
- kephalonomancy /kəˈfælənoʊmænsi/ → see cephaleonomancy
- keraunomancy /kɪˈrɒnoʊmænsi/ → see ceraunoscopy
- knissomancy /ˈnɪsoʊmænsi/: by incense (Greek knisa [kniss-], 'vapor' + manteía, 'prophecy')
- kypomancy → see phyllomancy (akin to Greek kupellon, 'goblet' + manteía, 'prophecy')

== L ==
- labiomancy /ˈleɪbioʊmænsi/: by lips (Latin labium, 'lip' + Greek manteía, 'prophecy')
- lampadomancy /ˈlæmpədoʊmænsi/: by flame (Greek lampas [lampad-], 'light' + manteía, 'prophecy')
- lecanomancy/lecanoscopy /lɪˈkænoʊmænsi/: by a basin of water (Greek lekanē, 'basin' + manteía, 'prophecy')
- letnomancy: by secrets (English let no (man see) + Greek manteía, 'prophecy')
- libanomancy /laɪˈbænoʊmænsi/ → see capnomancy and spodomancy (Greek libanos, 'frankincense' + manteía, 'prophecy')
- literomancy /ˈlɪtəroʊmænsi/: by a letter in a written language (Latin lītera, 'letter' + Greek manteía, 'prophecy')
- lithomancy /ˈlɪθoʊmænsi/: by gems or stones (Greek lithos, 'stone' + manteía, 'prophecy')
- logarithmancy /ˌlɒɡəˈrɪθmənsi/: by logarithms (English logarithm + Greek manteía, 'prophecy')
- logomancy /ˈlɒɡoʊmænsi/: by words (Greek logos, 'word' + manteía, 'prophecy')
- lots: divination through chance, or the drawing or tossing of lots
- lunamancy → see selenomancy (Latin lūna, 'moon' + Greek manteía, 'prophecy')
- lychnomancy /ˈlɪknoʊmænsi/: by candles (Greek lukhnos, 'lamp' + manteía, 'prophecy')

== M ==
- macharomancy: by swords or knives (Greek makhaira, 'dirk' + manteía, 'prophecy')
- macromancy /ˈmækroʊmænsi/: by large objects (Greek makros, 'large' + manteía, 'prophecy')
- maculomancy /ˈmækjʊloʊmænsi/: by spots on the skin (Latin macula, 'spot' + manteía, 'prophecy')
- mahjong divination: by Mahjong tiles
- margaritomancy /ˌmɑːrɡəˈrɪtoʊmænsi/: by bouncing pearls (Greek margarītēs, 'pearl' + manteía, 'prophecy')
- mathemancy /ˈmæθɪmænsi/: by mathematics (English mathe(matics) + Greek manteía, 'prophecy')
- mazomancy /ˈmæzoʊmænsi/: by nursing (Greek mazos, 'breast' + manteía, 'prophecy')
- meconomancy /mɪˈkoʊnoʊmænsi/: by sleeping (Greek mēkōn, 'poppy' [i.e., an opiate] + manteía, 'prophecy')
- megapolisomancy: by large cities (English megalopolis + Greek manteía, 'prophecy')
- meilomancy: by moles
- metagnomy /mɪˈtæɡnoʊmi/ or /mɪˈtænoʊmi/: by magic (Greek meta-, 'beside' + -gnōmoniā, 'interpretation')
- meteormancy /ˈmiːtioʊrmænsi/: by meteors (English meteor + Greek manteía, 'prophecy')
- meteoromancy /ˌmiːtiˈɒroʊmænsi/: by thunder and lightning (Greek meteōron, 'heavenly phenomenon' + manteía, 'prophecy')
- metoposcopy/metopomancy /ˌmɛtoʊˈpɒskoʊpi/: by the lines of the forehead (Greek metōpon, 'forehead' + -skopiā, 'observation')
- micromancy /ˈmaɪkroʊmænsi/: by small objects (Greek mikros, 'small' + manteía, 'prophecy')
- moleosophy /moʊˈlɒsoʊfi/ or /ˌmoʊliˈɒsoʊfi/: by blemishes (English mole + Greek sophiā, 'knowledge')
- molybdomancy /moʊˈlɪbdoʊmænsi/: by molten metal (Greek molubdos, 'lead' + manteía, 'prophecy')
- moromancy /ˈmɒroʊmænsi/: by foolishness (Greek mōros, 'dull' + manteía, 'prophecy')
- myomancy → see theriomancy
- myrmomancy → see theriomancy

== N ==
- narcomancy /ˈnɑːrkoʊmænsi/: by sleep (Greek narkē, 'numbness' + manteía, 'prophecy')
- natimancy → see somatomancy (Latin natis, 'buttock' + Greek manteía, 'prophecy')
- necromancy¹ /ˈnɛkroʊmænsi/: by speaking to the dead, by corpses (Greek nekros, 'corpse' + manteía, 'prophecy')
- necyomancy /ˈniːsioʊmænsi/: by summoning damned souls (Greek nekuiā, 'invocation' + manteía, 'prophecy')
- nephomancy /ˈnɛfoʊmænsi/: by clouds (Greek nephos, 'cloud' + manteía, 'prophecy')
- nigromancy /ˈnaɪɡroʊmænsi/: by black magic (Latin niger, 'black' + Greek manteía, 'prophecy')
- nomancy /ˈnɒmənsi/ or /ˈnoʊmənsi/ → see onomancy (variant of onomancy, influenced by Latin nōmen, 'name')
- notarikon/netrikon: by initials (Latin notāricus, in shorthand)
- nggàm → see theriomancy
- numerology /ˌnjuːməˈrɒloʊdʒi/: by numbers (Latin numerus, 'number' + Greek -logia, 'branch of study')
- numismatomancy: by coins (Greek nomisma [nomismat-], 'coin' + manteía, 'prophecy')

== O ==
- oculomancy /ˈɒkjʊloʊmænsi/: by eyes (Latin oculus, 'eye' + Greek manteía, 'prophecy')
- odontomancy /oʊˈdɒntoʊmænsi/: by teeth (Greek odous [odont-], 'tooth' + manteía, 'prophecy')
- oenomancy/oinomancy /ˈiːnoʊmænsi/: by wine (Greek oinos, 'wine' + manteía, 'prophecy')
- ololygmancy /oʊˈlɒlɪɡmænsi/: by the howling of dogs (Greek ololuzō [ololug-], 'howl' + manteía, 'prophecy')
- omoplatoscopy → see scapulimancy (Greek ōmoplatē, 'shoulder blade' + -skopiā, 'observation')
- omphalomancy /ˈɒmfəloʊmænsi/: by navels (Greek omphalos, 'navel' + manteía, 'prophecy')
- oneiromancy/oneiroscopy /oʊˈnɪəroʊmænsi/: by dreams (Greek oneiros, 'dream' + manteía, 'prophecy')
- onimancy /ˈɒnɪmænsi/ → see onychomancy
- onomancy/onomomancy/nomancy /ˈɒnoʊmænsi/: by letters in a name (Greek onoma, 'name' + manteía, 'prophecy')
- onomomancy /oʊˈnoʊmoʊmænsi/ → see onomancy
- onychomancy/onymancy/onimancy /oʊˈnɪkoʊmænsi/: by finger· and toenails (Greek onux [onukh-], 'nail' + manteía, 'prophecy')
- onymancy /ˈɒnɪmænsi/ → see onychomancy
- oomancy/ooscopy /ˈoʊoʊmænsi/ (also ovomancy): by eggs (Greek ōion, 'egg' + manteía, 'prophecy')
- ophidiomancy/ophiomancy → see theriomancy
- ophthalmomancy → see oculomancy (Greek ophthalmos, 'eye' + manteía, 'prophecy')
- organoscopy → see phrenology (Greek organon, 'organ' + -skopiā, 'observation')
- orniscopy/ornithomancy → see theriomancy
- oromancy: by mountains (Greek oros, 'mountain' + manteía, 'prophecy')
- oryctomancy: by minerals (Greek oruktos, 'dug' + manteía, 'prophecy')
- ossomancy → see osteomancy (Latin os [oss-], 'bone' + Greek manteía, 'prophecy')
- osteomancy: by bones (Greek osteon, 'bone' + manteía, 'prophecy')
- Ouija/Ouije: by ouija board (French oui, 'yes' + German ja, 'yes')
- ouranomancy → see uranomancy
- ovomancy → see oomancy (Latin ōvum, 'egg' + Greek manteía, 'prophecy')

== P ==
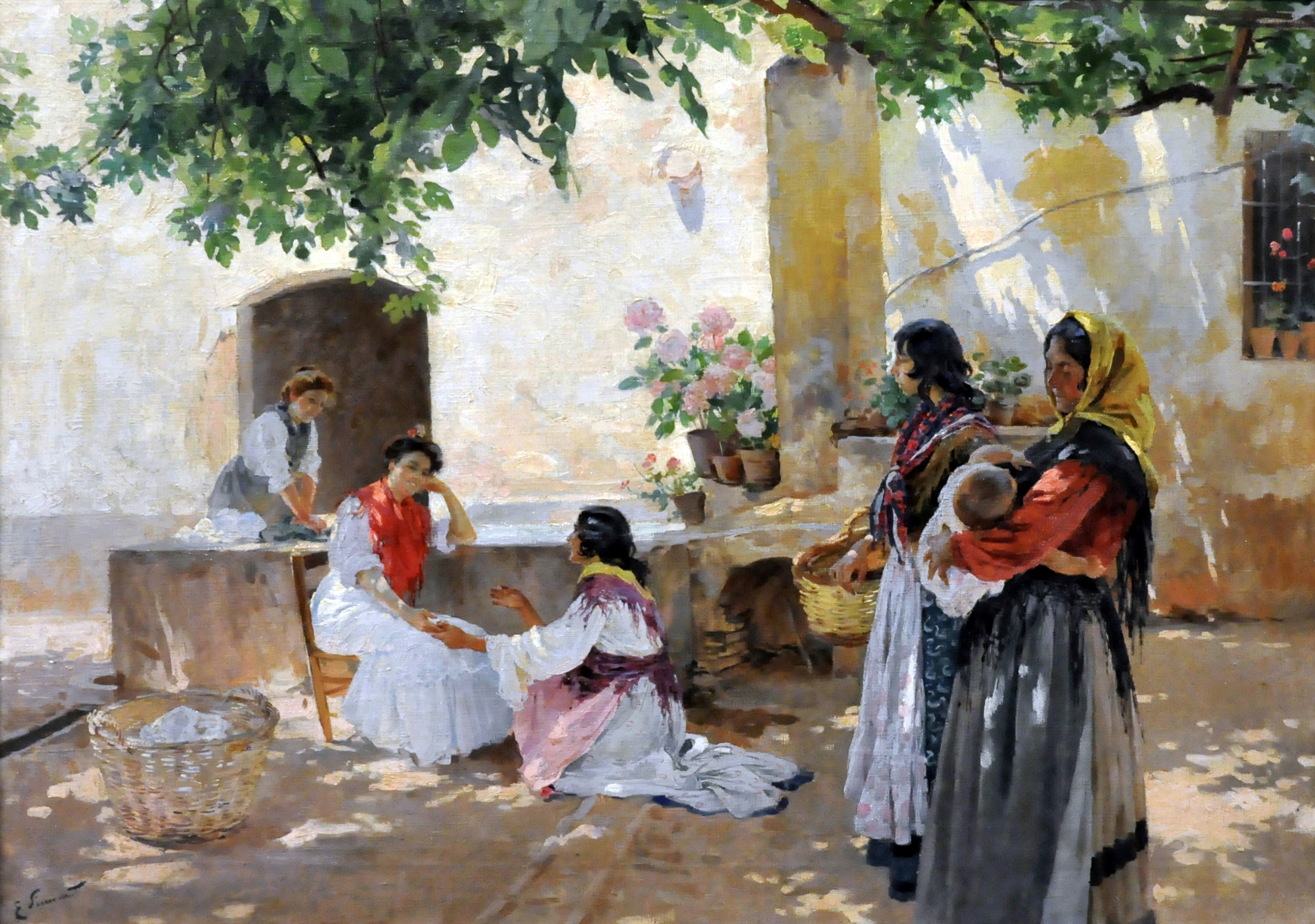
The Fortune Teller, by Enrique Simonet (1899; canvas; Museo de Málaga), depicting a palm reading.

- Pagtatawas by reading melted alum
- pallomancy: by pendulums (Greek pallein, 'to sway' + manteía, 'prophecy')
- palmistry/palm reading → see somatomancy (Latin palma, 'palm')
- papyromancy: by folding paper, especially paper money (Greek papūros, 'papyrus paper' + manteía, 'prophecy')
- pedomancy → see somatomancy (from podomancy, influenced by Latin pēs [pēd-], 'foot')
- pegomancy: by fountains (Greek pēgē, 'spring' + manteía, 'prophecy')
- pessomancy: by pebbles (Greek pessos, 'oval pebble' + manteía, 'prophecy')
- pecthimancy/petchimancy: by brushed cloth (possibly akin to Greek pekein, to card wool, or pēktē, 'netting' + manteía, 'prophecy')
- phallomancy: by swing of the phallus (Greek phallus, 'phallus' + manteía, 'prophecy')
- phobomancy: by feelings of fear (Greek phobos, 'fear' + manteía, 'prophecy')
- photomancy: by fields of light (Greek phōs [phōt-], 'light' + manteía, 'prophecy')
- phrenology (also organoscopy): by the configuration of one's brain (Greek phrēn, 'mind' + -logiā, 'study')
- phyllomancy: by leaves (Greek phullon, 'leaf' + manteía, 'prophecy')
  - sycomancy: by fig leaves (Greek sūkon, 'fig' + manteía, 'prophecy')
  - tasseography/tasseomancy (also kypomancy): by tea leaves or coffee grounds (French tasse, 'cup' + Greek -graphiā, 'representation')
- phyllorhodomancy: by rose petals (Greek phullon, 'leaf' + rhodon, 'rose' + manteía, 'prophecy')
- physiognomy/physiognomancy: by faces (Greek phusis, 'nature' + -gnōmoniā, 'interpretation')
- phytognomy: by the appearance of plants (Greek phuton, 'plant' + -gnōmoniā, 'interpretation')
- Planchette
- plastromancy: by cracks formed by heat on a turtle's plastron (English plastron + manteía, 'prophecy')
- pilimancy: by observing the patterns produced by a collection of human hair
- plumbomancy: by observing shapes molten lead makes when poured in water (Latin plumbum, 'lead' + Greek manteía, 'prophecy')
- pneumancy: by blowing (Greek pneuma, 'breath' + manteía, 'prophecy')
- podomancy/pedomancy → see somatomancy
- poe divination: by throwing stones on the floor, practised at Taoist temples
- portenta (also ostenta): study of natural phenomena
- psephomancy: by lots or ballots (Greek psephos, 'pebble' + manteía, 'prophecy')
- pseudomancy: by false means (Greek pseudēs, 'false' + manteía, 'prophecy')
- psychognomy: by phrenological 'notations' (Greek psūkhē, 'soul' + -gnōmoniā, 'observation')
- psychomancy → see necromancy¹ (Greek psūkhē, 'soul' + manteía, 'prophecy')
- ptarmoscopy/ptarmoscopie: the interpretation of sneezes (from Ancient Greek)
- pyromancy/pyroscopy: by fire (Greek pūr, 'fire' + manteía, 'prophecy')

== Q ==
- qabalah → see kabbalah

== R ==
- radiesthesia: by rods, pendulums, or other cylindrical tools (Latin radius, 'spoke' + Greek -aisthēsiā, 'sensing')
- retromancy: by looking over one's shoulder (Latin retrō, 'behind' + Greek manteía, 'prophecy')
- rhabdomancy/rabdomancy: by rods, sticks, or wands (Greek rhabdos, 'rod' + manteía, 'prophecy')
- rhapsodomancy: by poetry (Greek rhapsōidiā, 'verse' + manteía, 'prophecy')
- roadomancy: by constellations (apparently from Old English rodor, 'firmament' + Greek manteía, 'prophecy')
- runecasting → see cleromancy

== S ==
- scapulimancy/scapulomancy (also spatulamancy, omoplatoscopy): by bovine or caprid shoulder blades (Latin scapula, 'shoulder blade' + Greek manteía, 'prophecy')
- scarpomancy: by old shoes (Italian scarpa, 'shoe' + Greek manteía, 'prophecy')
- scatomancy: by excrement (Greek skōr [skat-], 'excrement' + manteía, 'prophecy')
- schematomancy → see somatomancy
- sciomancy¹ (also shadowmancy): by shadows (Greek skiā, 'shadow' + manteía, 'prophecy')
- sciomancy²: by spirits (of the same origin as sciomancy¹)
- scrying: by gazing (shortened from descrying)
  - crystal gazing: by reflective objects
    - catoptromancy/captromancy (also enoptromancy, djubed): by mirrors (Greek katoptron, 'mirror' + manteía, 'prophecy')
    - gastromancy¹ (also crystallomancy, spheromancy, crystal ball gazing): by crystal ball (Greek gastēr, 'belly' [i.e., round object] + manteía, 'prophecy')
    - hydromancy (also ydromancy): by water (Greek hudōr, 'water' + manteía, 'prophecy')
- selenomancy: by the moon (Greek selēnē, 'moon' + manteía, 'prophecy')
- shadowmancy → see sciomancy¹ (English shadow + Greek manteía, 'prophecy')
- shufflemancy: by the use of an electronic media player such as an electronic playlist, iPod, or other medium wherein one skips a certain number of songs and the lyrics and/or tune of the song is the answer to the divinatory question
- sideromancy: by burning straw with an iron (Greek sidēros, 'iron' + manteía, 'prophecy')
- sikidy: by drawing sixteen lines in sand (perhaps a Malagasy transliteration of English sixteen)
- skatharomancy: by beetle tracks (Greek skatharōn, 'spot' + manteía, 'prophecy')
- slinneanachd/slinnanacht: by animal shoulder blades (Scottish Gaelic slinnean, 'shoulder blade')
- solaromancy: by the sun (Latin sōl [sōlār-], 'sun' + Greek manteía, 'prophecy')
- somatomancy: by the human form (Greek sōma [sōmat-], 'body' + manteía, 'prophecy')
  - cephalomancy (also craniognomy): by skulls (Greek kephalē, 'head' + manteía, 'prophecy')
  - cheiromancy/chiromancy /kaɪˈrɒmænsi/ (also palmistry, palm reading): by palms (Greek kheir, 'hand' + manteía, 'prophecy')
  - cheirognomy/chirognomy /kaɪˈrɒ(ɡ)noʊmi/: by hands (Greek kheir, 'hand' + -gnōmoniā, 'interpretation')
  - podomancy/pedomancy (also cartopedy): by the soles of one's feet (Greek pous [pod-], 'foot' + manteía, 'prophecy')
  - schematomancy: by the face (Greek skhēma [skhēmat-], 'figure' + manteía, 'prophecy')
- sortilege: by the casting of lots, or sortes
  - sortes virgilianae: by Vergil's Aeneid
- spasmatomancy: by convulsions (alteration of spasmodomancy, from Greek spasmos [spasmōd-], 'spasm' + manteía, 'prophecy')
- spatilomancy: by animal excrement (Greek spatilē, 'excrement' + manteía, 'prophecy')
- spatulamancy → see scapulimancy (from scapulimancy, influenced by Latin spatula, 'splint')
- spheromancy → see scrying (Greek sphaira, 'sphere' + manteía, 'prophecy')
- sphondulomancy: by spindles (Greek sphondulos, 'spindle' + manteía, 'prophecy')
- splanchnomancy → see anthropomancy (Greek splankhna, 'innards' + manteía, 'prophecy')
- spodomancy: by soot (Greek spodos, 'wood ashes' + manteía, 'prophecy')
  - cineromancy/ceneromancy: by the ashes of a specifically sacrificial or ritual fire
  - libanomancy /laɪˈbænoʊmænsi/: by smoke or ash from incense (Greek libanos, 'frankincense' + manteía, 'prophecy')
  - tephramancy/tephromancy: by tree bark ashes, by sacrificial or ritual fire ashes, or human sacrificial victim ashes (Greek tephrā, 'ash' + manteía, 'prophecy')
- stareomancy: by the four elements (Greek stais [stair-], 'dough' + manteía, 'prophecy')
- stercomancy: by seeds in bird excrement (Latin stercus, 'excrement' + Greek manteía, 'prophecy')
- sternomancy: by ridges on the breastbone (Greek sternon, 'breastbone' + manteía, 'prophecy')
- stichomancy → see chartomancy
- stigonomancy: by burning writing onto bark (Greek stizein [stigōn-], 'to brand' + manteía, 'prophecy')
- stoicheomancy/stoichomancy → see chartomancy
- stolisomancy: by fashion (Greek stolis, 'garment' + manteía, 'prophecy')
- styramancy: by observing patterns produced by chewing gum, gum wax, or products produced by the L. styraciflua tree
- sycomancy → see phyllomancy
- symbolomancy: by things found on the road (Greek sumbolon, 'sign' + manteía, 'prophecy')

== T ==
- taromancy → see chartomancy
- tasseography/tasseomancy → see phyllomancy
- technomancy: by technology (English techno(logy) + Greek manteía, 'prophecy')
- temurah: → see kabbalah
- tephramancy/tephromancy: → see spodomancy (Greek tephrā, 'ash' + manteía, 'prophecy')
- theomancy: foretelling events, prophecy (Greek theos, 'god' + manteía, 'prophecy')
- theriomancy /ˈθɪərioʊmænsi/: (also zoomancy): by animal behavior (Greek thēr, 'wild animal' + manteía, 'prophecy')
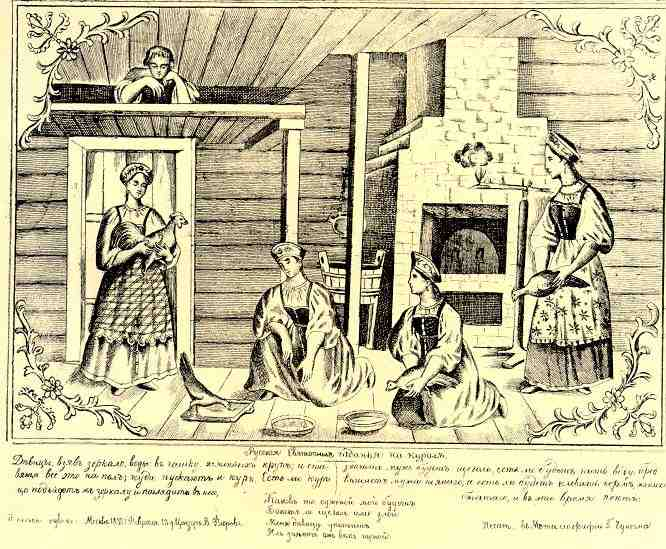
  Russian peasant girls using chicken for divination. A 19th·century lubok.
  - ailuromancy/aeluromancy /aɪˈlʊəroʊmænsi/ (also felidomancy): by cats (Greek ailouros, 'cat' + manteía, 'prophecy')
  - alectryomancy/alectoromancy /əˈlɛktərioʊmænsi/: by rooster behavior (Greek alektruōn, 'cockerel' + manteía, 'prophecy')
  - augury: by bird formations (Latin augur, 'diviner')
  - hippomancy /ˈhɪpoʊmænsi/: by horse behavior (Greek hippos, 'horse' + manteía, 'prophecy')
  - ichthyomancy /ˈɪkθioʊmænsi/: by fish behavior (Greek ikhthūs, 'fish' + manteía, 'prophecy')
  - myomancy /ˈmaɪoʊmænsi/: by rodent behavior (Greek mūs, 'mouse' + manteía, 'prophecy')
  - myrmomancy /ˈmɜːrmoʊmænsi/: by ant behavior (Greek murmēx, 'ant' + manteía, 'prophecy')
  - nggàm: by spider or crab behavior (Mambila nggàm, 'divination')
  - ophidiomancy/ophiomancy: by snake behavior (Greek ophis [ophid-], 'snake' + manteía, 'prophecy')
  - orniscopy/ornithomancy (also auspicy/auspication, avimancy): by bird migration (Greek ornīs [ornīth-], 'bird' + -skopiā, 'observation')
- thumomancy /ˈθjuːmoʊmænsi/: by one's own soul, presage (Greek thūmos, 'soul' + manteía, 'prophecy')
- topomancy /ˈtɒpoʊmænsi/: by geography and geological formations (Greek topos, 'place' + manteía, 'prophecy')
- transataumancy: by things accidentally seen or heard
- trochomancy /ˈtrɒkoʊmænsi/: by wheel ruts (Greek trokhos, 'wheel' + manteía, 'prophecy')
- turifumy: by shapes in smoke (Latin tūs [tūr-], 'incense' + fūmus, 'vapor')
- tyromancy/tiromancy /ˈtaɪəroʊmænsi/: by cheese (Greek tūros, 'cheese' + manteía, 'prophecy')

== U ==
- umbilicomancy: by umbilical cords (English umbilic(al cord) + Greek manteía, 'prophecy')
- umbromancy: by shade (Latin umbra, 'shadow' + Greek manteía, 'prophecy')
- uranomancy/ouranomancy: by the sky (Greek ouranos, 'firmament' + manteía, 'prophecy')
- uromancy/urimancy: by urine (Greek ouron, 'urine' + manteía, 'prophecy')
- urticariaomancy: by itches (Neo-Latin urticāria, 'hives' + Greek manteía, 'prophecy')

== V ==
- videomancy: by films (English video + Greek manteía, 'prophecy')

== W ==
- water witching → see dowsing
- wishbone → see furcula

== X ==
- xenomancy: by strangers (Greek xenos, 'stranger' + manteía, 'prophecy')
- xylomancy: by the shape or texture of wood, or the appearance of burning wood (Greek xulon, 'wood' + manteía, 'prophecy')

== Y ==
- ydromancy¹ → see scrying
- ydromancy² → see alomancy (from idromancy above, influenced by alomancy)

== Z ==
- zoomancy → see theriomancy (Greek zōion, 'being' + manteía, 'prophecy')
- zygomancy: by weights (Greek zugon, 'yoke, balance' + manteía, 'prophecy')
- zeteomancy: by seeking out knowledge

== See also ==
- Divination
- List of astrological traditions
- Wiktionary category:English words suffixed with -mancy
