= Pyromancy =

Divination by means of fire

A candle's flame

Pyromancy (Ancient Greek ἐμπυρία (empyria), divination by fire) is the art of divination by means of fire or flames.

The word pyromancy is adapted from the Greek word pyromanteia, from pyr (πῦρ, fire) and manteia (μαντεία, divination by means of). Its first known use was in the 1300s, and it evolved into the Late Latin word piromantia and Old French word piromance.

== History of pyromancy ==
Due to the importance of fire in society in prehistory and its continued importance within civilizations, it is quite likely that pyromancy was one of the earlier forms of divination, arising independently in many civilizations around the world.

In much of Western culture, fire was often associated with a god, or was revered as a god itself. Fire was associated with a living being (because it ate, breathed, grew, decayed, and died) in both Western and non-Western religions. Fire was so basic to the human experience that it has persisted in the minds of humanity as an element close to nature.

The eternal fire at Nymphaion in southern Illyria (present-day Albania) also functioned as an oracle. The forms of divination practiced in this natural fire sanctuary with peculiar physical properties were widely known to the ancient Greek and Roman authors.

Fire rituals in Mesopotamia and Eurasia were thought to originate with ancient Zoroastrian rituals around the use of fire in temples and on altars. Ancient Zoroastrians believed fire to have been "the most holy spirit" from which all life was born, and fire was used as a central icon in many Zoroastrian rituals.

In the Old Testament, fire was often associated with divine intervention; with the burning bush guiding the decision of Moses, and the pillar of fire guiding the Israelites in the wilderness. Even the burning of Sodom and Gomorrah was accomplished through divine retribution.

Greek legends of the origins of fire speaks to the importance of fire to separate humans from animals. To many ancient Greeks, fire was a godly element that was bestowed by higher forces, having been given to humans by the Titan Prometheus. It is said that in Greek society, virgins at the Temple of Athena in Athens regularly practiced pyromancy. It is also likely that the followers of Hephaestus, the Greek god of fire and the forge, practiced pyromancy.

In Renaissance magic, pyromancy was classified as one of the seven "forbidden arts", along with necromancy, geomancy, aeromancy, hydromancy, chiromancy (palmistry), and scapulimancy.

Fire rituals in East Asia most often revolved around animal bones. In ancient China, Japan, and Tibet, bones from animal scapula (the shoulder bone) would be thrown into fires, and the cracks would be interpreted to divine the future. This made up an important part of the culture of ancient China, with these bones later being referred to as oracle bones. In Japan, turtle shells would also be used as a ritualistic divination technique, a practice that continues today in Shinto ritual. In Tibet, such divination was used to understand natural phenomena that was otherwise inexplicable to villagers. Lamps that use animal fat were often burned by ancient Tibetan peoples, and the smoke and flames thereof were interpreted as the guidance of natural forces.

== Types of pyromancy ==
The most basic form of pyromancy is that in which the diviner observes flames, from a sacrificial fire, a candle, or another source of flame, and interprets the shapes that he or she sees within them. However, there are several variations of pyromancy, some of which are as follows:

- Alomancy: divination by salt, one type of which involves casting salt into a fire
- Botanomancy: divination by burning plants
- Capnomancy: divination by smoke; light, thin smoke that rose straight up was a good omen; otherwise, a bad one.
- Causinomancy: divination by burning (non-specific as to the object burned)
- Daphnomancy (also called empyromancy): divination by burning laurel leaves
- Osteomancy: divination using bones, one type of which involves heating to produce cracks
- Plastromancy: divination using turtle plastrons; in China, this was done by heating pits carved into them.
- Scapulimancy: divination by scapulae; in Asia and North America, this was done through pyromancy.
- Sideromancy: divination by burning straw with an iron.
