= Cyclomancy =

Divination involving spinning or turning

Cyclomancy is a form of divination and spiritual practice based on spinning either an object or the self. The term itself first appears in Rolfe Humphries's Roget 511 but was popularised by occult-inspired self-help and New Thought author Frank Rudolph Young. In Young's usage, it is thought to grant wide-ranging psychic power, but now is more commonly associated with and is ascribed to any spinning-related practices of divination, particularly object-spinning. Gyromancy is used for a specific kind of person-spinning.

== Origins of "cyclomancy" ==
=== Roget 511 ===
The first extant use of the term is in the poem Roget 511 by Rolfe Humphries which is also titled OR, HOW TO FIND OUT ABOUT THINGS AND WATCH OUT FOR PEOPLE. It uses the Roget Thesaurus entry for the word prediction as a model, but creates some new words in comparison to the entry, including cyclomancy. The quote reads as follows: "or turning wheel" which is followed by a footnote defining divination with this method as cyclomancy.

=== Frank Rudolph Young ===
The term cyclomancy was popularised in practice by Frank Rudolph Young's Cyclomancy: The Secret of Psychic Power Control (1966). He previously wrote of this in other books such as How To Develop Keen Reflexes, The Hidden Art of Nerve-Rejuvenation (1960) under the pseudonym Zohar Science, and applied for copyright over the term. This source is highly criticised, with the author known for cultural appropriation and pseudoscience, therefore it is difficult to verify any historical or cultural claims he makes.

This book claims that Cyclomancy is "the one true form of magic". Part of Cyclomancy's back flap, on what cyclomancy will bestow upon a practitioner, reads as follows:

What kinds of powers? Powers like these:

- The power to know what people look like before you even see them!
- The power to reduce and stay slim without starvation!
- The power to slow down or halt the aging process so that you may actually live many years longer!
- The power to weaken a dangerously defiant person with the Psychic Harpoon!
- The power to compel someone who ignores you romantically to notice you with keen interest!
- The power to send and receive messages through space—across a room, a city, or a continent—to anyone, any time you want!

And still that's just the beginning!

This definition of cyclomancy is primarily concerned with the turning of the body and mind, rather than objects. An interview with Sirhan Bishara Sirhan testifies that he studied this type of cyclomancy, and he says that he experienced "visual delusions" while experimenting with it.

== Traditions of Object-spinning Divination ==
=== Modern Spirituality ===
The term is used by some Wiccans and other witches or spiritual practices to describe a reinterpretation of this term. Essential Wicca (2001) defines it as follows:

cyclomancy—Divination using a spinning device. 1) The jury wheel was an ancient device to pick members for a jury by writing their names on a wheel and spinning the wheel until the jury was filled. 2) The roulette wheel is a modern wheel of fortune that is spun and lands on prize-winning numbers. 3) An object (like a top) is spun in a circle of drawings or letters, and where it falls determines the answer. 4) An object like a top is inscribed with symbols and spun, and whichever side lands up when it stops determines the answer, like a dreidel. Spinning arrows may be used instead of a wheel or top.

Pendulums, which may spin or swing, are also used for divinatory purposes. They may also specifically be used for dowsing.

=== Tongan ta nioo ===
In Tongan culture, earlier western ethnographers attest to stories of the spinning of a coconut as a divinatory practise. Mariner refers to this as "the charm of ta nioo". The first use is to discover a guilty party, and the second is to discover the fate of a sick person. However, some sources themselves also clarify that things of these nature are, for example, "no longer possible to observe at first-hand" even at their times of writing in the 19th and 20th century due to Christianisation. One source also relates this to the spinning of the coconut for amusement with no interpretation taken from its result.

=== Speculated traditions of object-spinning divination ===
==== Greco-Roman spinning tops ====
The teetotum is a form of spinning top that consists of a body marked with letters or numbers, that is seen in both ancient Greece and Rome, but continued into later traditions. It was primarily used for gambling and other games, despite belief that it was used for divination. Fate was associated with spinning wheels, however, this is linked with the goddess Fortuna (Roman) or Tykhe (Greek) who was associated with the wheel of fortune, as a representation of the mutability of fortune, rather than as an actual divinatory practice.

It is not unknown for chance-related objects to be used for divination, but this is associated with other objects such as lots, dice and knucklebones in this period.

The criticism of modern witchcraft in that it is not actually connected to historical practises, but rather speculations on ideas of such, may be connected to why this is later interpreted as an ancient Roman divinatory practice.

==== Japanese spinning tops ====
Koma are Japanese spinning tops. They traditionally have symbolic and spiritual meaning. There is speculation about their original usage, if they were also used in religious rituals or divination.
