= Aspidomancy =

Divination method

Aspidomancy (from the Greek word aspis meaning shield) is a form of divination based on the interpretation of patterns on a shield. Reading the patterns is believed to give some insight into the future. Readers study the shield, looking for a pattern that may represent symbols or pictures. They interpret these symbols and pictures as clues as to what is going to happen in the future.

Aspidomancy can also refer to the method of divination of sitting on a shield and reciting incantations to enter a trance, in order to gain knowledge. This method was first described in the 17th century by French writer Pierre de Lancre.

== See also ==
- Methods of divination
