= Dactylomancy =

Divination using rings

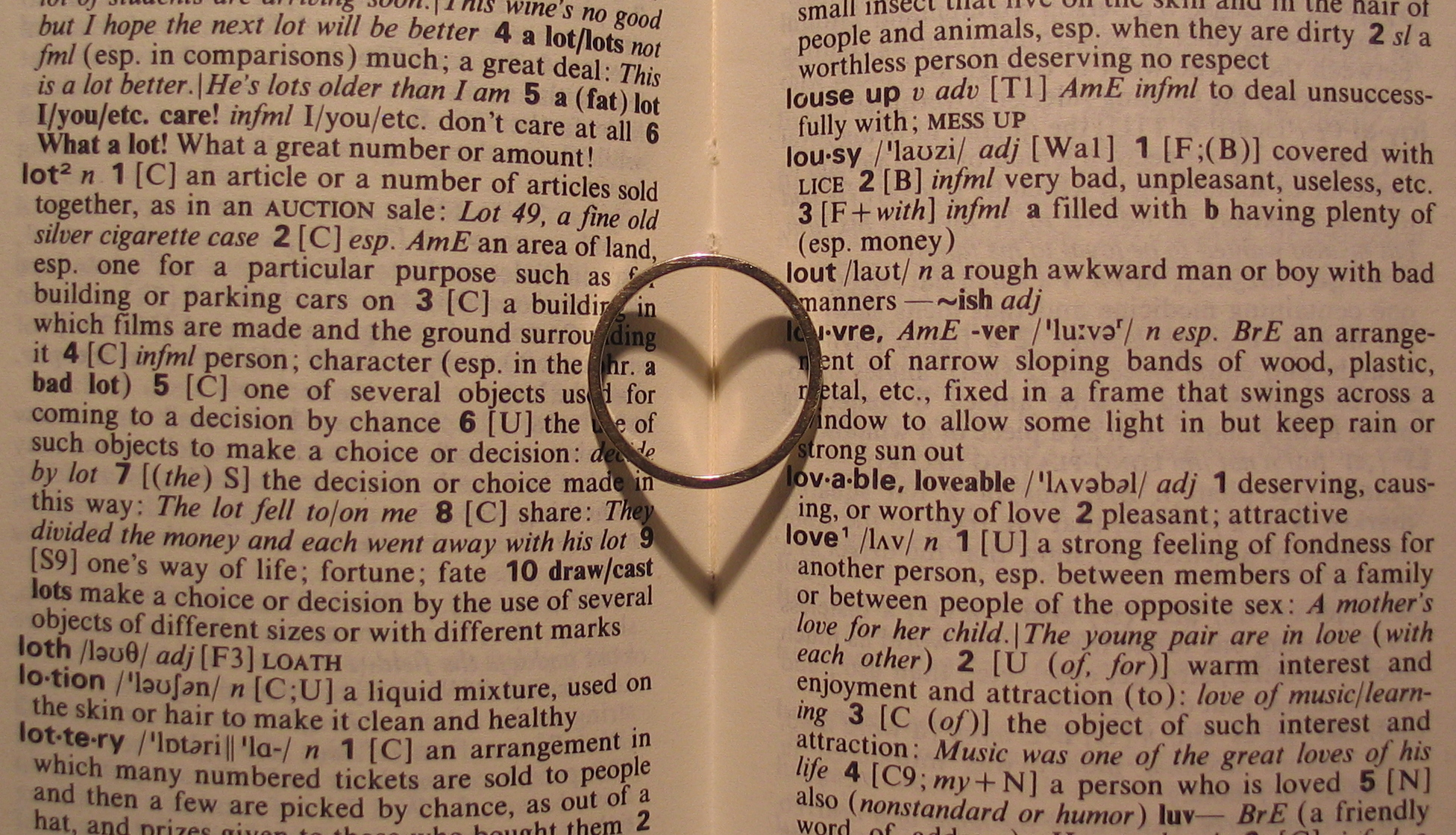
A golden ring. Associated with Sunday in dactylomancy practices of the Middle Ages.

Dactylomancy, from the Greek word for finger, is a term used by proponents to define a form of divination using rings.

== Modern dactylomancy ==
In some traditions of dactylomancy, a ring is suspended like a pendulum above a surface that is marked with letters or symbols. The direction of the swing indicates which symbols are to be consulted, or which letter are to be formed into a message, in answer to a specific question. Another tradition follows the same pattern as Séance table-rapping. In it a ring is suspended from a tumbler so that it may touch the sides if swung and a code is agreed upon (e.g., 1 for yes, 2 for no). A question is then posed and the number of the times that the ring strikes the side of the tumbler is interpreted as being an answer.

== Historic dactylomancy ==
A more complex form of dactylomancy was practiced in Europe during the Middle Ages in which a ring was suspended above a circular table marked with the symbols of the zodiac. 78 metal discs inscribed with a letter of the alphabet (three discs per letter) were then placed on the table and the thread holding the ring was burnt. The letters that the ring rolled across and the one on which it halted were then consulted to form the answer to the question being divined. In this tradition, the metal from which the ring was made was determined by the day of the week.

- Monday - Silver, to represent the moon
- Tuesday - Iron, to represent Mars
- Wednesday - Tin/lead, to represent Mercury
- Thursday - Tin, to represent Jupiter
- Friday - Copper, to represent Venus
- Saturday - Lead, to represent Saturn
- Sunday - Gold, to represent the sun

According to Diderot, the person who held the ring was typically dressed from head to toe in only a sheet of cloth; his head was shaved in a circular manner, and he held verbena in his hands.

Modern dactylomancy is usually associated with spiritualism and new age beliefs, rather Parapsychology.

== See also ==
- Methods of divination
