= Tyromancy =

Method of divination using cheese

Tyromancy is a method of divination or fortune-telling using cheese. Written accounts of the practice date from the 2nd century AD, with it reaching the height of its popularity in the Middle Ages and early modern period. In the 21st century, the practice draws on methods from dream interpretation and antique spell manuals.

== History ==
The first recorded mention of tyromancy is believed to be in Oneirocritica, a 2nd-century AD treatise on dream-interpretation by Greek diviner Artemidorus of Daldis. Artemidorus claimed it to be one of the most unreliable forms of divination, writing that "the truth is spoken by sacrificers and bird-diviners and astrologers and observers of wonders and dream-diviners and liver-examiners alone". He counted tyromancers as "false diviners" along with dice-diviners, sieve-diviners, and necromancers. At the Second Council of Ephesus in 449, bishop Sophronius of Tella was accused of various forms of divination including tyromancy, and oomancy (divination with eggs).

In a piece for food magazine Saveur, 21st-century tyromancer Jennifer Billock claims that the practice of cheese fortune-telling reached peak popularity in agrarian England in the Middle Ages and early modern period. She claims that using cheese was more convenient than previous methods of divination like molybdomancy which used molten metal as most families had some sort of milk-producing livestock. According to Billock, tyromancy had all but disappeared by the 1920s. She speculates that this may in part be due to the popularity of the Rider–Waite tarot card-deck which was introduced in 1909. Billock, however, provides no sources for her claims, and the validity of her statements is unclear.

In 2023, Billock's own practice was covered by the CBC News in Canada and by ABC News in Australia. She described tyromancy as a fun method of divination because participants get to eat the cheese after their fortune has been told.

== Method ==
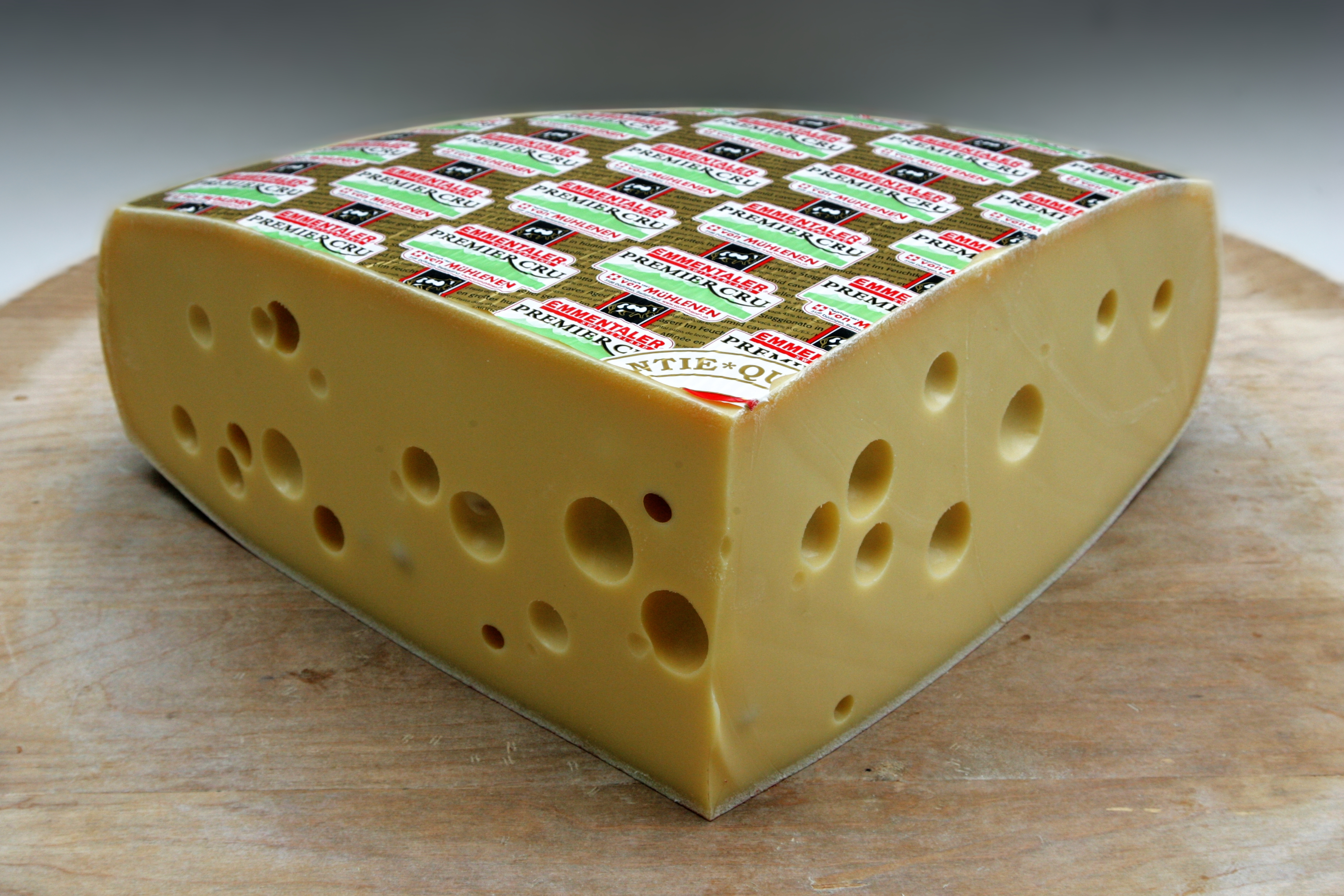
Reading eyes in Swiss-type cheese, like this emmental, can be a method of tyromancy.

ABC News defines tyromancy as being divination involving "the observation of cheese, especially as it coagulates", with areas of focus including smell, patterns and texture of the cheese. Jennifer Billock describes it as "the practice of telling fortunes with cheese". Her method involves looking for shapes and symbols in the cheese, including observing ridges, holes, crystallization, and mottling on the rind. Some of the symbols she looks for include a heart shape, meaning love, an arrow meaning a journey, a dog meaning companionship, and a baby meaning change. She has based this method on sources including antique spell manuals and dream interpretation book transcripts, saying "there wasn't any sort of central repository of tyromancy information". Valya Dudycz Lupescu has written that some methods of tyromancy, such as reading eyes in Swiss-type cheese, can draw on numerology. Billock says that any type of cheese can be used for divination. The best types are those with "visible surface variations", like blue cheese. Cheeses with little surface variation are broken in half or crumbled onto a plate to read the ridges of the break or the shapes the crumbled pieces make.

== In popular culture ==
An episode of animated television series Kipo and the Age of Wonderbeasts features three goat witches, the Chevre sisters, who use cheese to tell the future. The video game The Witcher 3: Wild Hunt features a quest named "Of Dairy and Darkness" involving a mage with connections to tyromancy.

== See also ==
- Tasseography
