= Myomancy =

Practice of reading omens from the behavior of rats or mice

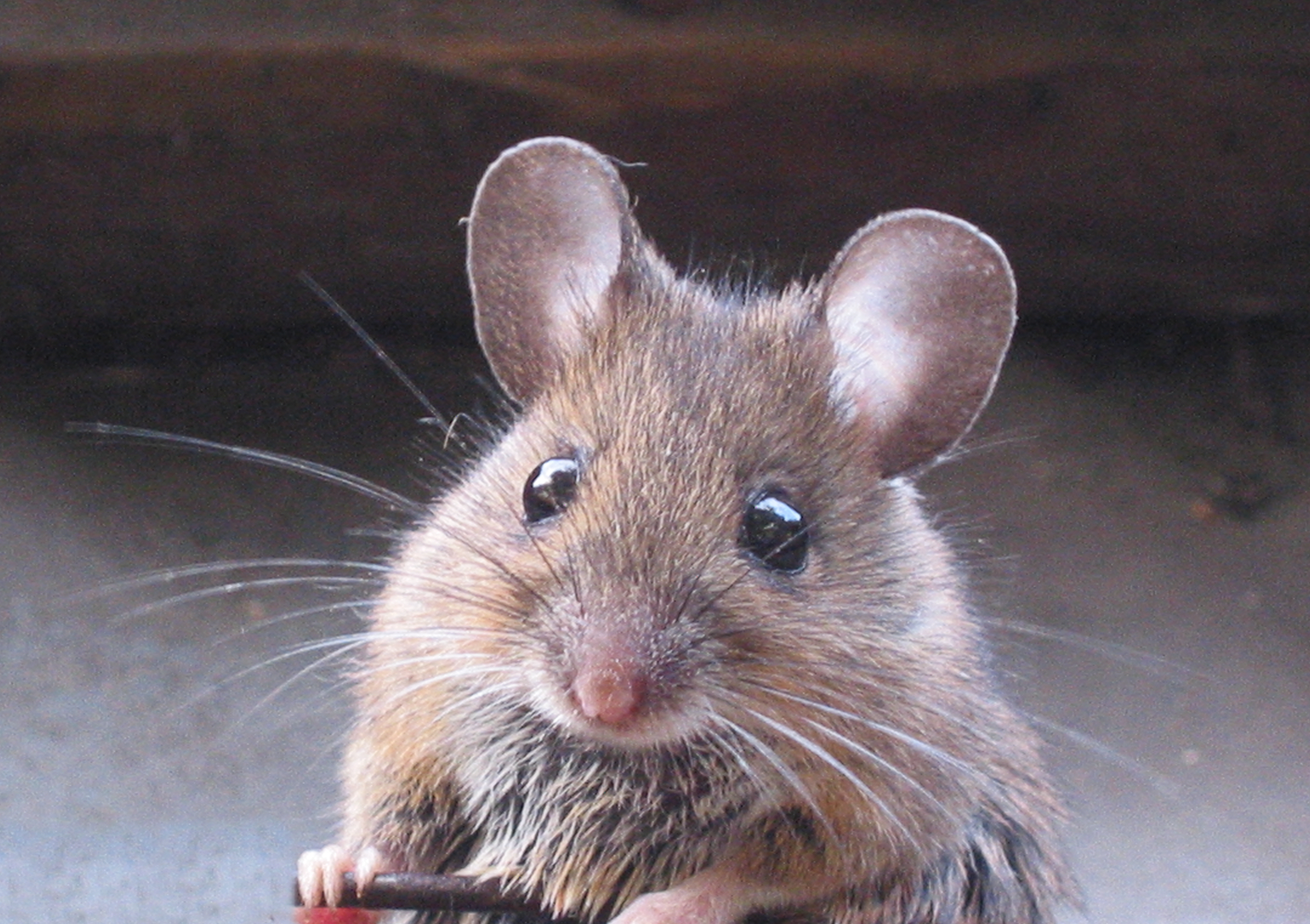
A wood mouse

Myomancy (from myo- "mouse" + -mancy "divination by means of") is the practice of reading omens from the behavior of rats or mice, a "theriomantic" method of divination which might be implied in the Bible verse Isaiah 66:17.

In the context of Western history, certain mouse or rat vocalizations ("their particular cries") and other phenomena, including severe cases of damage wreaked by the rodents, was taken to be a sign predictive of evil. For example, Ælain relates that Quintus Fabius Maximus Verrucosus resigned the dictatorship in consequence of a "warning" from these creatures; according to Varro, Cassius Flaminius retired from the command of the cavalry for the same reason.

Horapollo describes the rat as a symbol of destruction. According to Herodotus, Sennacherib's attempt to invade Egypt was thwarted due to his army's weapons being systematically destroyed by rats the night before they were due to attack.

The Hebrew word for "mouse" is derived from a root meaning "to separate, divide, or judge". It was remarked by one of the commentators on Horapollo that the mouse has a finely discriminating taste. An Egyptian manuscript in the Bibliothèque nationale de France in Paris contains the representation of a soul going to judgement in which one of the figures is depicted with the head of a rat wearing a traditional judges' wig.
