= Ichnomancy =

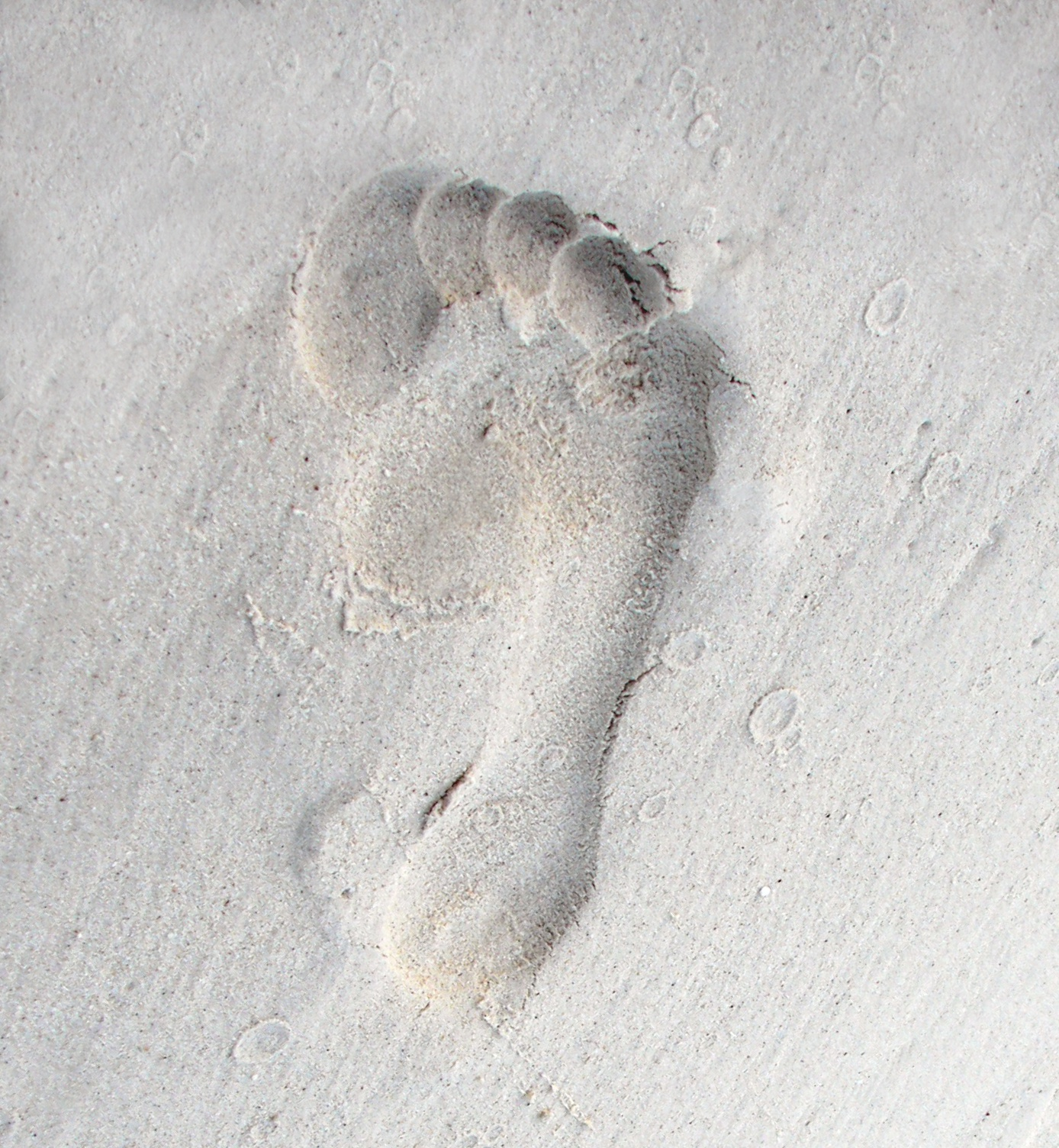
Using footprints as objects of divination is "ichnomantic"

Ichnomancy (from ichno- "track, footstep" + -mancy "method of divination") is the divination of a person's qualities (e.g., posture, position) or character (i.e., personality) by means of footprints or other such human-made tracks.

== See also ==
- Divination
- Methods of divination
- Foot pressure
- Gait analysis
