= Podomancy =

Divination by examining the lines of soles

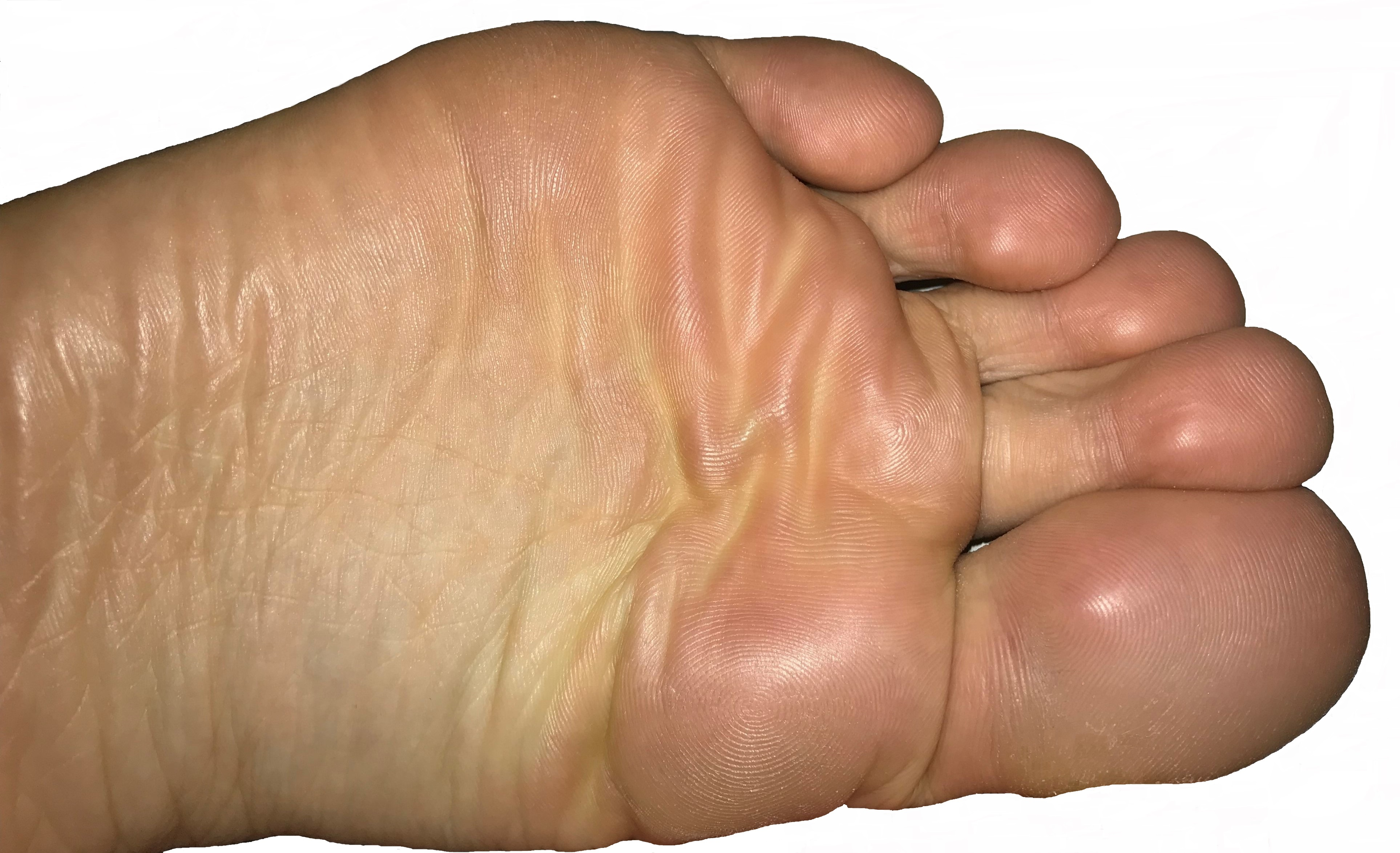
There are many shapes and lines on a person's foot sole

Podomancy (also known as solistry) is a divination by examining the lines of soles. Similar to palmistry, where the divination is based on the person's palm shape and lines, podomancy is based on the belief that a person's feet represent the symbol of that person's soul. Diviners interpret sizes, shapes and lines of the feet to (supposedly) reveal the personality and the future of the person to be divined upon. Podomancy used to be a popular form of divination in China.

== See also ==
- Divination
- Methods of divination
