= Scatomancy =

Fortune-telling by examining excrement

Scatomancy is the reading of a person's fortune by examining their bodily excrement, or by examining those of an animal. It is also known as spatalomancy, spatilomancy, copromancy, and spatalamancy.

== Definition ==
Scatomancy is literally "divination by excrement". The process by which excrement is scrutinized is referred to in modern medical terminology as a stool test (or, rarely, "scatoscopy") and is used to detect many conditions including some varieties of cancer.

== History ==
In ancient times scatomancers were often influential members of their community called upon to assist in medical diagnosis and trial by ordeal. In one of scatomancy's forms, popular in ancient Egypt, kleptomantic dung beetles were employed. These insects were held sacred and immortalized by the Egyptians. They shape, roll and weave dung balls as a sexual display and courtship attractor. The beetles' speed and behavior, as well as the appearance of the dung balls, were all taken into consideration for the prognostications.

The examination of feces and urine by physicians and folk medicine practitioners has also been performed since ancient times. Medicine men and women were knowledgeable on it, and made predictions as well as diagnoses from feces examination, resembling today's medical professionals and laboratories.
