= Onomancy =

Fortune-telling based on a person's name

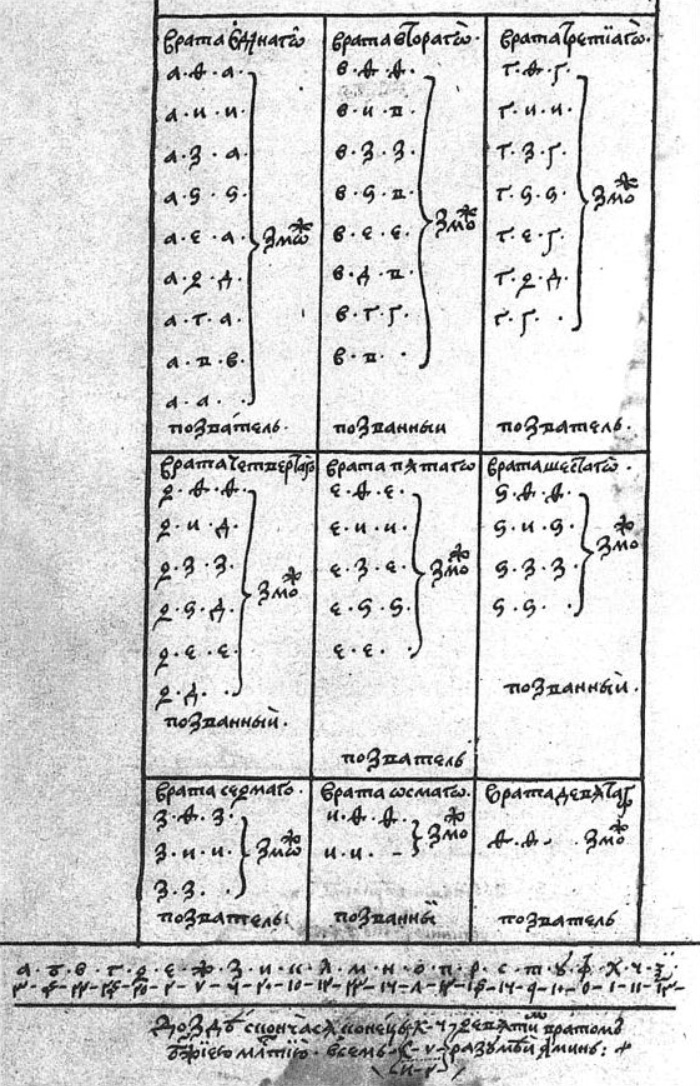
Onomantic table from the Russian version of the Secretum Secretorum

Onomancy (or nomancy) is divination based on a subject's name. Onomancy gained popularity in Europe during the Late Middle Ages, but is said to have originated with the Pythagoreans in antiquity. Several methods of analyzing a name are possible, some of which are based on arithmancy or gematria.

An early example of onomancy is found in the Secretum Secretorum. The system given there involves adding up the numerical values of the letters in the names of two antagonists, dividing the total for each person by 9, and comparing the remainders with a table which predicts the victor. (Note: Most European versions of the Secretum Secretorum omit the onomancy, but it is present in the Russian translation, a Spanish translation from the 13th century, and one English version which may have been derived from the Spanish.)

In China and Taiwan, onomancy is known as 姓名學 (Chinese: xìngmíngxué), and in Japan, onomancy is known as 姓名判断 (Japanese: seimei handan). They are similar, and can take several forms, but the most popular is based on the character strokes in the subject's written name, and the result number will be modulo 81, the remainders 0, 1, 3, 5, 6, 7, 8, 11, 13, 15, 16, 17, 18, 21, 23, 24, 25, 29, 31, 32, 33, 35, 37, 38, 39, 41, 45, 47, 48, 52, 57, 58, 61, 63, 65, 67, 68 are “lucky” numbers.
