= Axinomancy =

Method of divination using an axe

Axinomancy is an obscure method of divination using an axe, hatchet, or (rarely) a saw. Most methods involve throwing an axe into the ground, or swinging it into a tree, and interpreting the direction of the handle or the quivering of the blade. A form of this is axiomancy; this is when the quivering of the blade of an axe that has been thrust into a wooden table is interpreted by the diviner.

Another interesting method is heating an axe-head in a fire until it glows, and then interpreting the colors and shapes. A variant, attributed to the ancient Greeks, who held it in good repute, is to balance a spherical piece of agate on the edge of the axe (held sharp edge up). The direction in which the agate rolls can be interpreted as needed.

Some sources claim that Psalm 74 refers to the use of axinomancy to predict the fall of Jerusalem, although in the text the reference to upright axes is not specifically for divination.
