= Cephalonomancy =

Form of divination involving skulls

Cephalonomancy (also known as cephaleonomancy or kephalonomancy) is an ancient form of divination which used two different methods; one was concerned with the shape of the skull, somewhat like extispicy or phrenology. The other involved heating the skull of a donkey or goat while reciting various phrases, often the names of criminal suspects. If the skull crackled or the jaw moved while a name was spoken, this was taken to identify the guilty party.
