= Dōbutsu uranai =

Dōbutsu uranai (動物占い in Japanese) or zoological fortune-telling is a recent Japanese divination trend based on an animal horoscope. Each person is categorized into an animal-type based on their birthdate, and based on their animal-type they are supposed to have certain personality traits. There are four categories of animals, each representing a position on two axes: self-centered vs. mindful of others and focused vs. easily distracted. The animals are distinctly different from those in the Chinese zodiac.

== Animal groups ==
- Earth group: (self-centered, focused)
  - Tiger
  - Wolf
  - Monkey
  - Koala
- Sun group: (self-centered, easily distracted)
  - Pegasus
  - Elephant
  - Lion
  - Cheetah
- Full moon group: (mindful of others, focused)
  - Sheep
  - Panther
- New moon group: (mindful of others, easily distracted)
  - Fawn
  - Tanuki (raccoon dog)
