= Capnomancy =

Divination by examining smoke

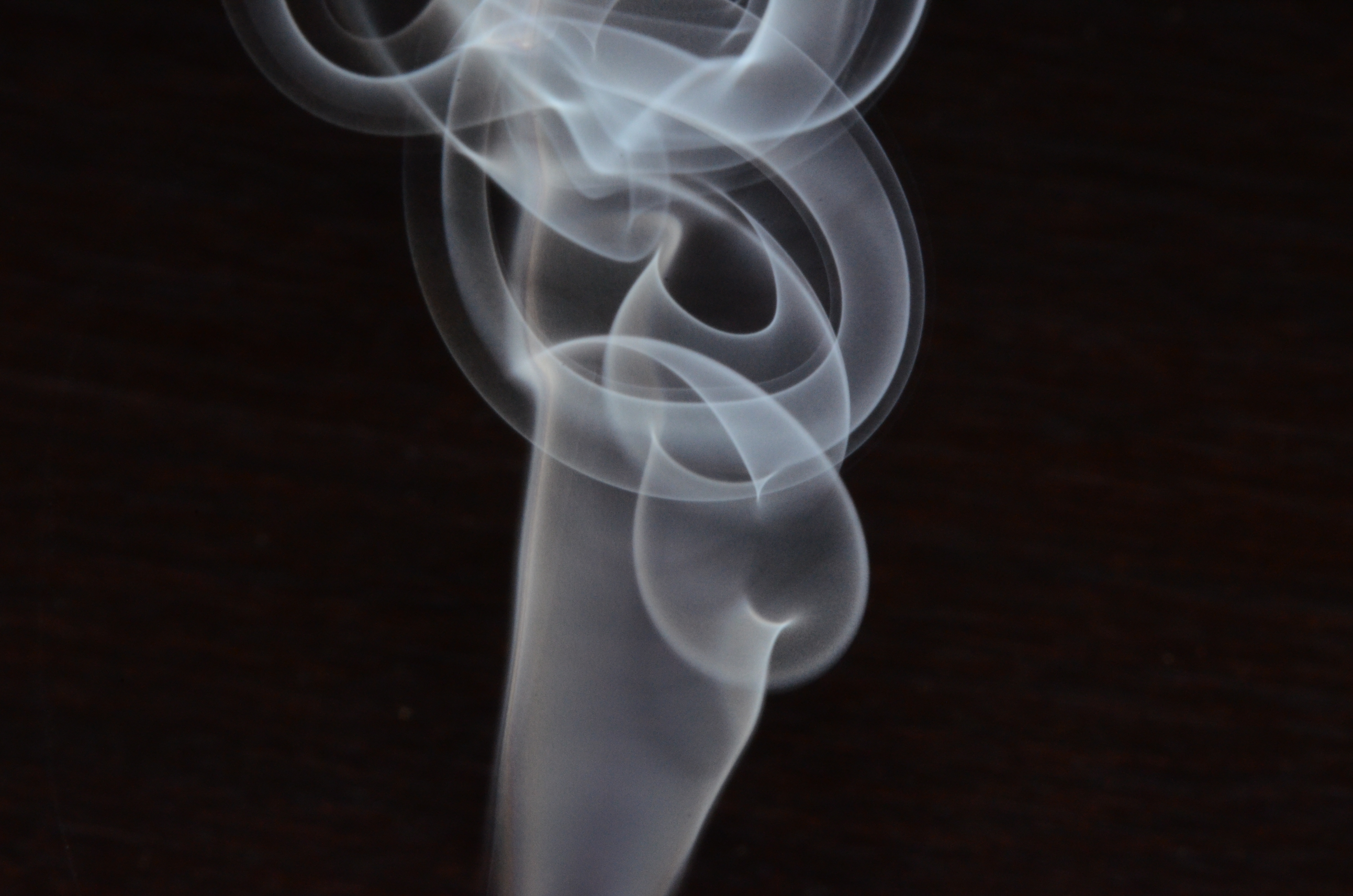
Some people believe that patterns in smoke can be examined to predict the future

Capnomancy is divination by examining smoke. This is done by looking at the movements of the smoke after a fire has been made. A thin, straight plume of smoke is thought to indicate a good omen whereas the opposite is thought of large plumes of smoke. If the smoke touches the ground, this is thought to be a sign that immediate action must be taken to avoid catastrophe.

When capnomancy involves the smoke from incense, then it is called libanomancy.

== Etymology ==
The word capnomancy comes from two Greek words: καπνός (kapnós), meaning smoke, and μαντεία (manteía), meaning divination or to see.

== History ==
The first recorded use of capnomancy was in ancient Babylonia, where the ceremony was performed at religious dates throughout the year, using cedar branches or shavings. In ancient Greece, priests would burn animal sacrifices and then perform capnomancy over the smoke that was produced by the fire.

The Celts were thought to practice dendromancy, a form of capnomancy, using oak and mistletoe branches.

It was also used by the Semang of Malaysia, who would use the ritual to determine whether a camp was safe for the night. There is reference made to the practice in both 17th and 19th century religious texts, although these do not describe how the practice was performed.

== Modern usage ==
Capnomancy has been reportedly used as late as 2003 in New England, where citizens would practice the ritual by using smoke plumes from chimneys. Other modern variations of the ritual involve burning cedar sticks, incense, or candles with ribbons tied around them. Hands are sometimes used to manipulate the smoke, with practitioners reading the shapes that are then produced.
