= Oculomancy =

Form of scrying

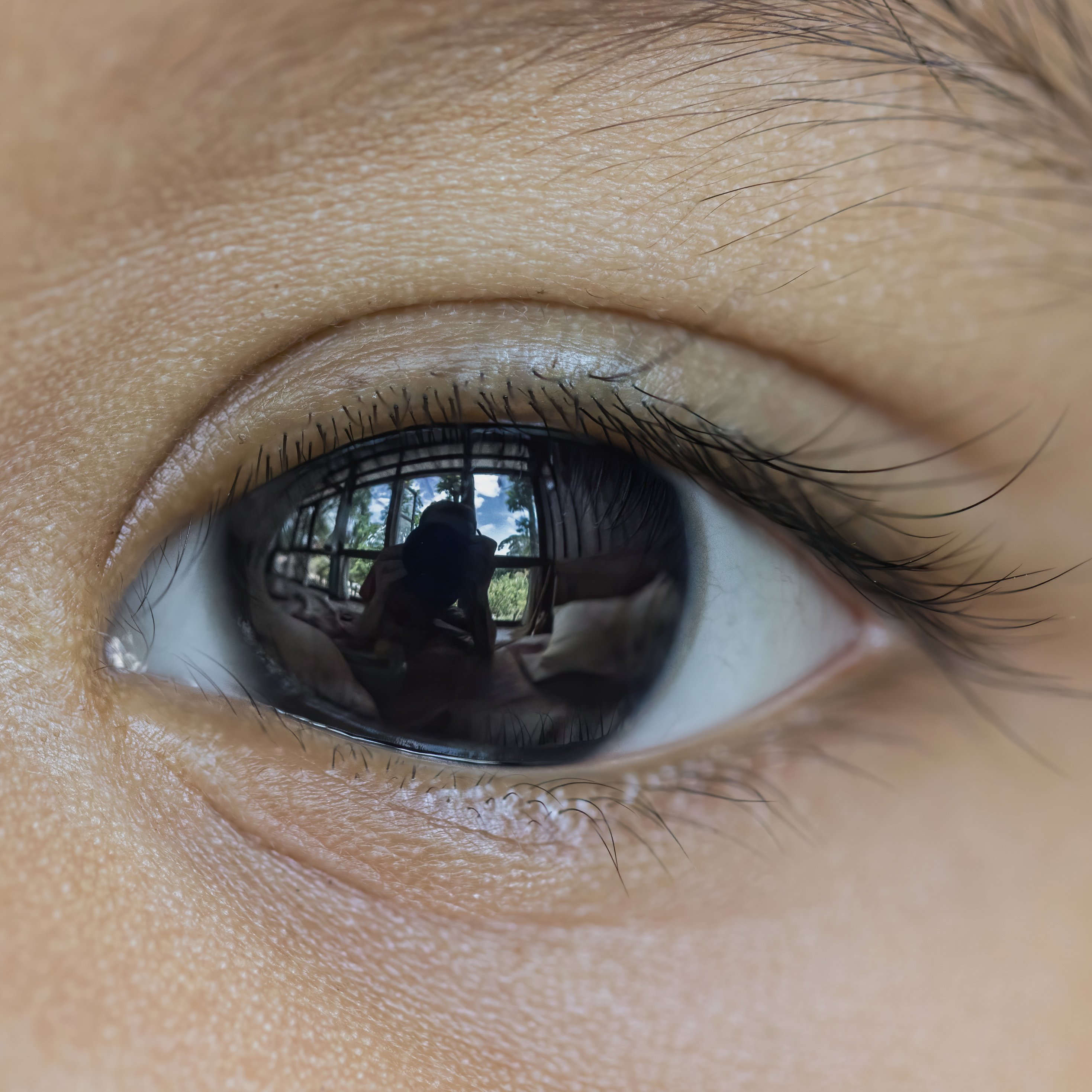
When looking closely at someone's eye many reflections are visible

Oculomancy (from the Latin oculus, "eye") is a form of scrying where the diviner gazes into the questioners' eyes and reads the reflections. It is a form of nacromancy that involves a diviner using witchcraft or dark magic to connect using dark magic means which Christians categorize as witchcraft and manipulation and take over control and manipulation of the victims vision to include the whole ocular unit and its muscles. The nacromancer using ocularmancy has complete control over the victims eyes in a way that it can cause them to move their eyes and any direction against their will and beyond their control as well as cause blindness and The necromancer using ocularmancy imposed there on ocular sensations such as color of the whites of their eyes if they're not white other vision problems as well as overall health problems because it changes the pressure in the victim's eyes.
