= Libanomancy =

Divination through observing incense smoke

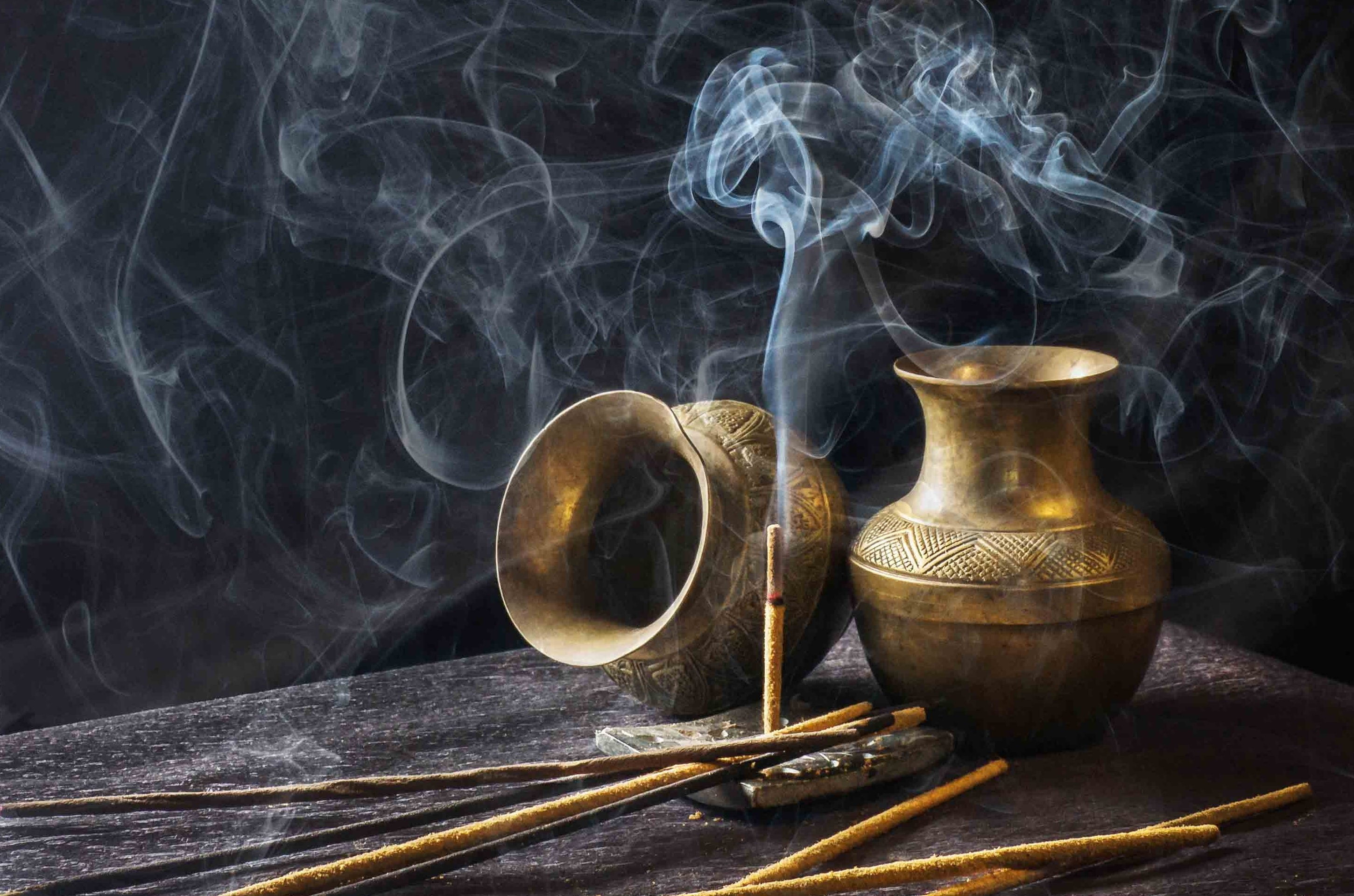
Burning incense gives off complex patterns of smoke

Libanomancy (also known as livanomancy and knissomancy) is a divination primarily through observing and interpreting burning incense smoke, but which may include the way incense ash falls as well. Like most other methods of divination, during libanomancy a specific question must be asked. The incense smoke provides an answer, but the smoke must be interpreted by a diviner.

The "libano-" in the word "libanomancy" is taken from the greek word "libanos", which means "frankincense". That is because frankincense was burned for the purpose of incense-divination.

== History of libanomancy ==
The original libanomancy manuals come from the Old Babylonian period, which is roughly dated to 2,000-1,600 BCE. Obviously popular at that time, this method of divination began to decline later, but the knowledge was preserved by trained diviners. From Mesopotamia, libanomancy traveled to Egypt, and later became known in Europe.

== Interpretation of the smoke ==
Libanomantic texts mention the possible interpretation of some of the signs in the smoke. For example, the Three Collated Libanomancy Texts say that if incense is sprinkled over an open flame and the smoke drifts to the right, you will defeat your enemy. If the smoke clusters, it means financial success. Rising smoke that forms two columns means the loss of one's sanity.

== See also ==
- Divination
- Methods of divination
