= Aleuromancy =

Use of flour for divination

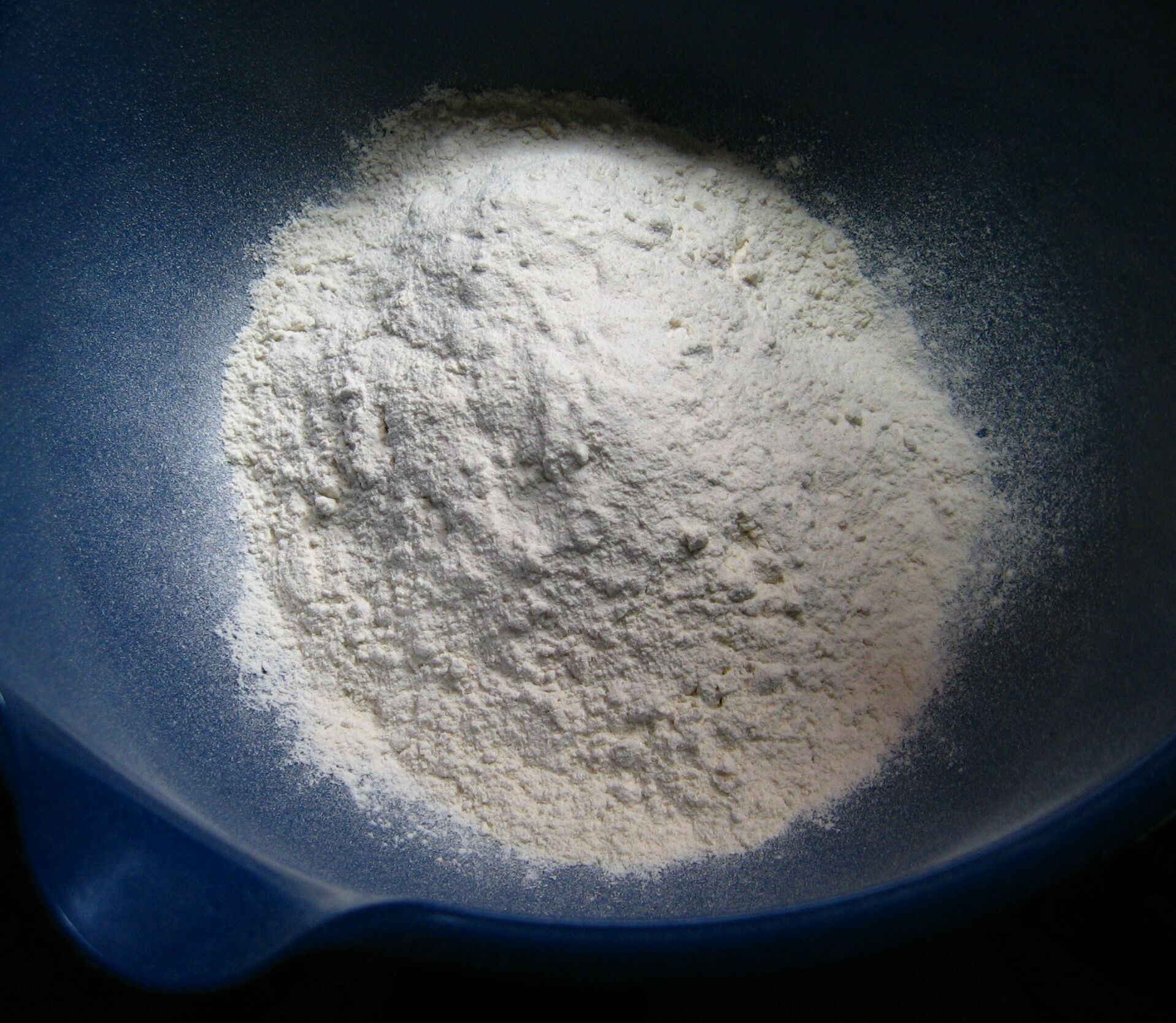
Unsifted wheat flour

Aleuromancy is the use of flour for divination. The word comes from the Greek aleuron, meaning flour, and manteia, meaning divination.

== Description ==
Divination with flour is attested in cuneiform tablets from the 2nd millennium BCE. Flour was poured out in small heaps and the interpretation was based on the observation of their shapes and orientation.

In its original form, slips of paper containing words of warning would be baked inside of cakes or cookies, which would then be distributed to those wishing their fortunes to be told. Similarly, the Greeks would bake slips of paper with sentences on them inside of balls of flour, mix the balls nine times, and distribute them. Modern fortune cookies are a variant on these forms of divination.

Another form of aleuromancy consisted of interpreting patterns of flour left in a bowl after a flour and water slurry had been mixed in it and poured away.

== See also ==
- Mola salsa, an ancient Roman religious use of flour
