= Oinomancy =

Oinomancy (or oenomancy or œnomancy) is a form of divination conducted by examining patterns in wine. An ancient technique, oinomancy was performed by a priestess known as a Bacchante, and protected by Bacchus, the Roman god of wine. Oinomancy is still practiced today, but is rare in the United States.

Oinomancy could be performed in a number of ways:

- Wine is spilled on cloth or paper, and the resulting stains are studied.
- Cloth or paper is soaked or boiled in wine, and the resulting appearance of the material is studied.
- The appearance of wine being poured as an offering during a libation is studied.
- The sediment in the bottom of a glass or bottle of wine is studied.
- The physical features (color, taste, etc.) of wine are studied.
