= Omphalomancy =

Method of divination

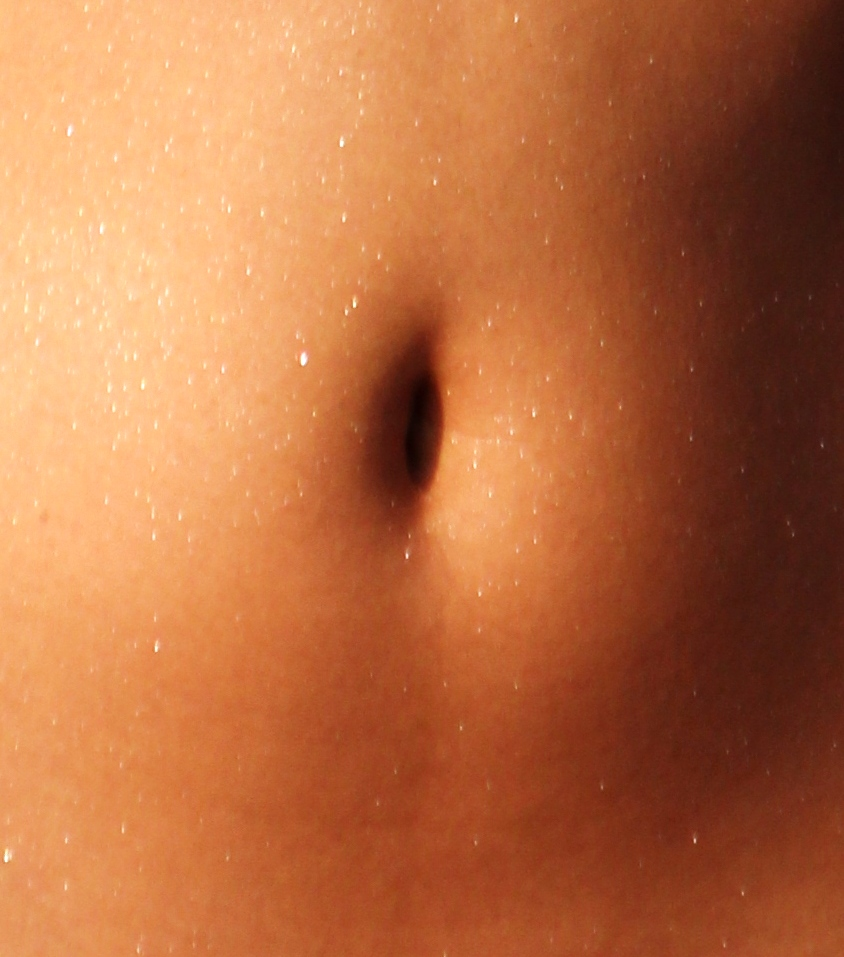
Human female navel

Omphalomancy is a method of divination used to determine an individual's character or fate by interpreting the size, shape and peculiarities of their navel (belly button).

In Buddhist tradition, the shape of the navel is classified and associated with certain types of behaviour. In ancient Chinese culture this was developed into a science.

Omphalomancy is also used to determine the number of future children a mother may have, based on the number of knots in a child's umbilical cord or the number of marks or bands on the navel.
