= Papyromancy =

Papyromancy is a way of divination through folding paper. Some say a true papyromancer can crumple up any piece of paper, unfold it, and predict the future from the creased lines reading the creased paper the way that a palm reader would read a person's palm. Another form of papyromancy is done by folding an illustrated piece of paper and interpreting the resulting image.

== Etymology ==
Derived from the Greek papuros (‘paper’) and manteia (‘prophecy’)

== Methods ==
A paper fortune teller is a form of origami. A player asks a question and the operator uses an algorithm to manipulate the fortune teller's shape. Questions, answers, colors or numbers may be written on the fortune teller. Manipulations are done by various methods. The holder asks for a number or color. Once the number or color is chosen, the holder uses their fingers to switch between the two groups of colors and numbers inside the paper fortune teller. The holder switches these positions several times determined by the number of letters in the color, the number chosen, or the sum of both. Once the holder has finished switching positions, the player chooses one of the flaps revealed. These flaps often have colors or numbers on them as well. The fortune is under the flap. Steps may be repeated and changed to suit the users.

== Criticisms ==
The paper fortune telling devices can be “rigged” by the placement of only even numbers on one “position” and only odd numbers on the other, causing forced placement to an even position. This will generate only good or bad fortunes.

== Examples ==
An urban legend where a specifically folded $20 American bill will reveal the September 11, 2001 attacks.

== Pictures ==
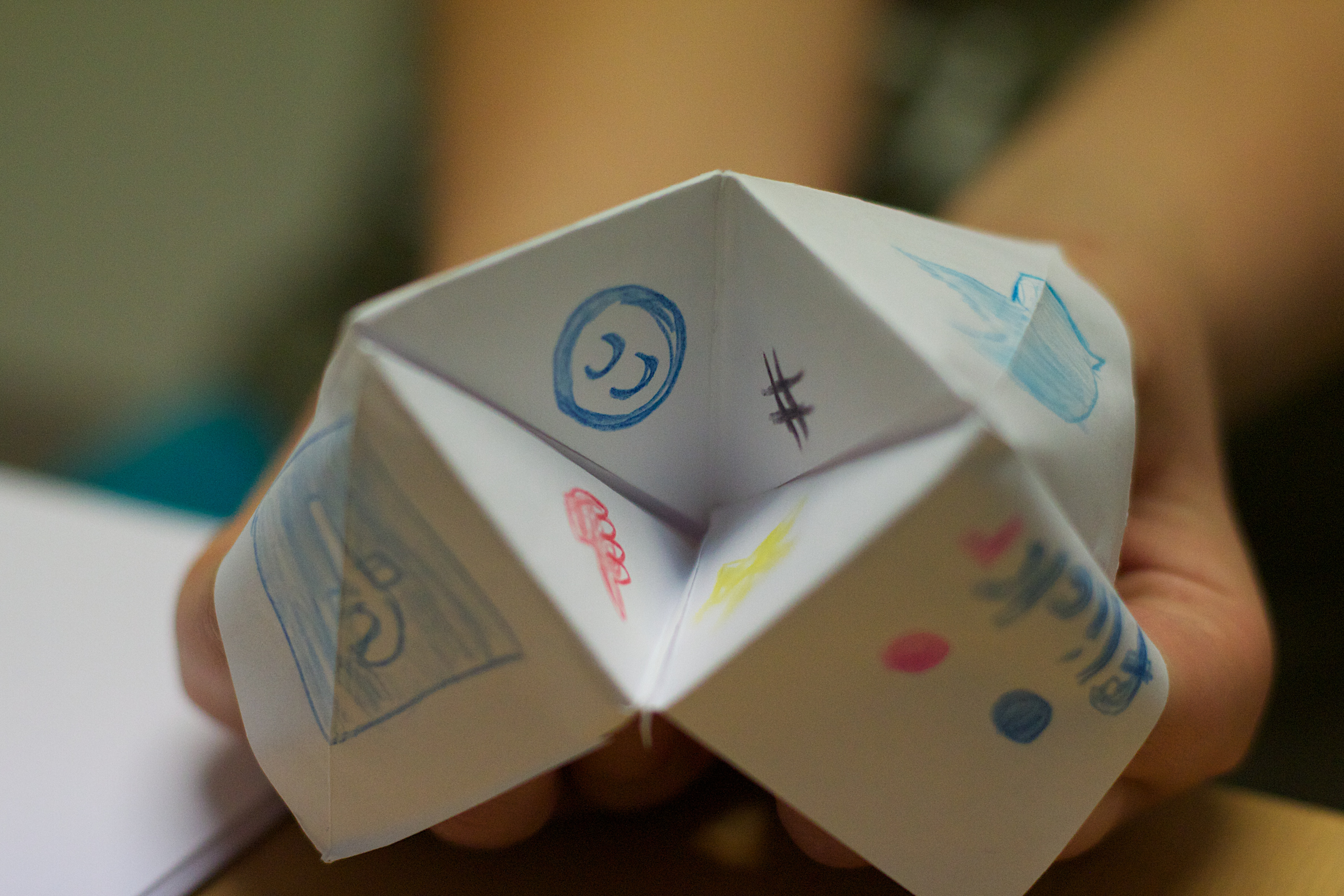

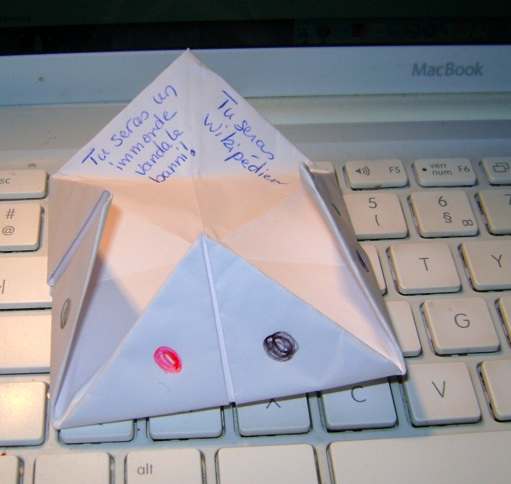

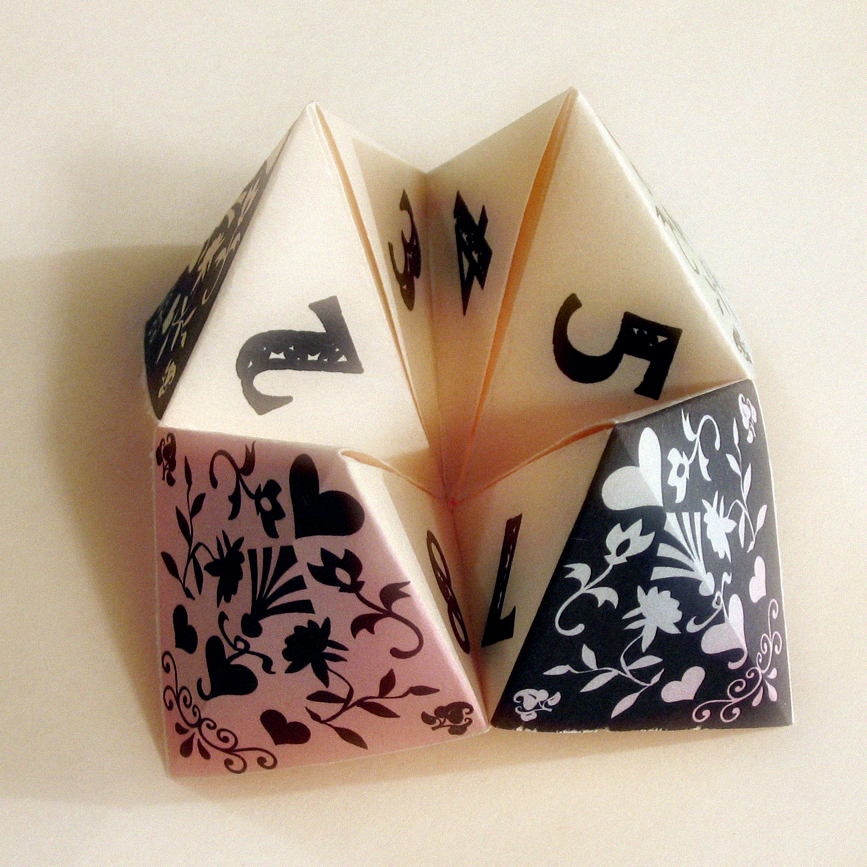

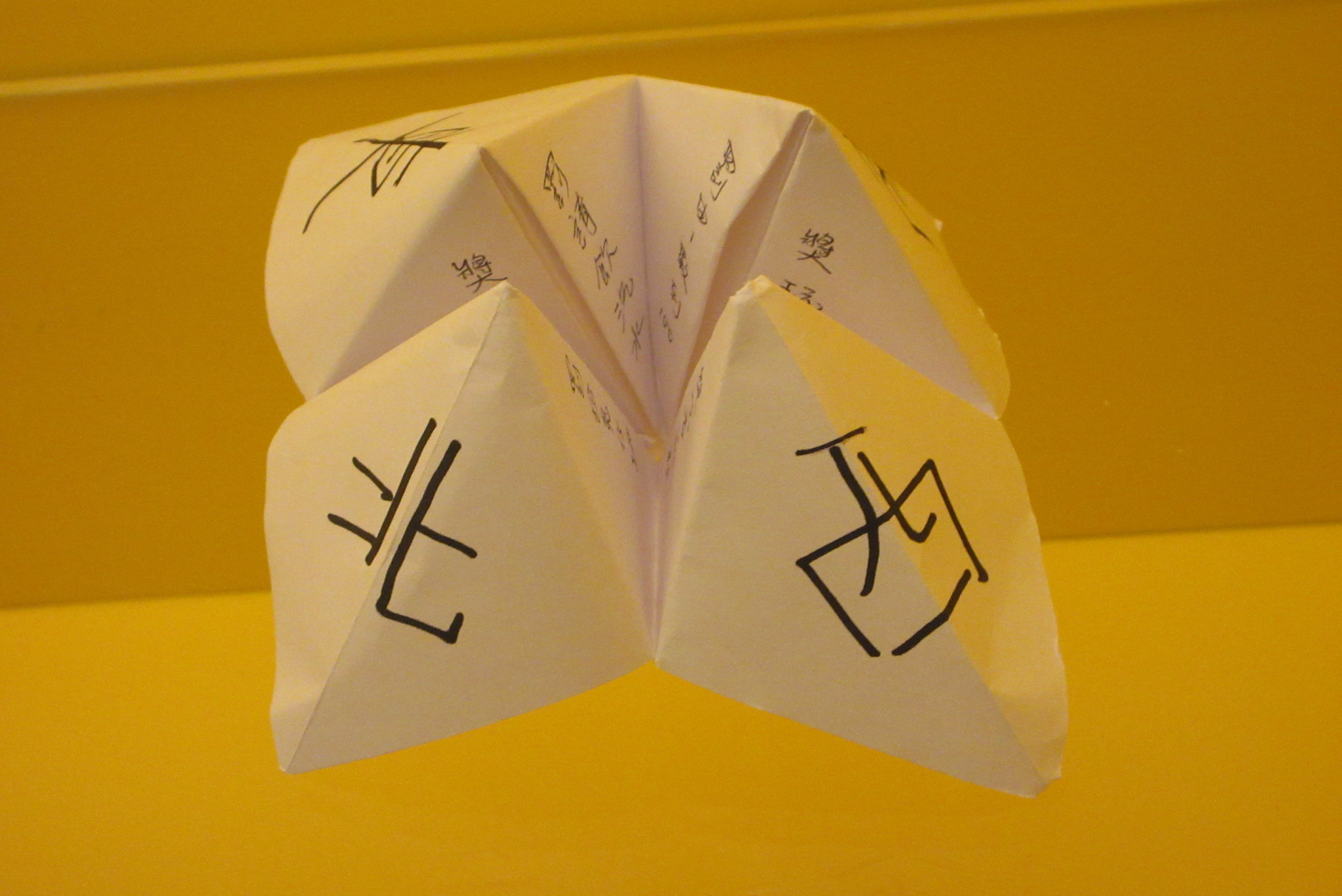
