= Ailuromancy =

Method of divination using cats

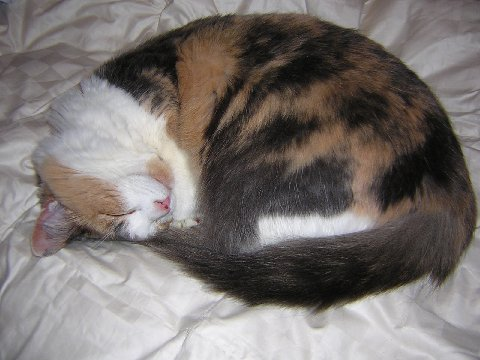
A curled up cat with its head touching the ground could, for some, portend storms

Ailuromancy or aeluromancy (from Greek: αἴλουρος, romanized: aílouros, lit. 'cat'), also known as felidomancy, is a form of theriomancy. It is divination using cats' movements or jumps to predict future events, especially the weather.

One of the most common methods of ailuromancy utilizes the movements and behaviours of a cat to predict upcoming weather patterns. For example, if the cat turns its tail to a fire or any substituting heat source, it foretells a possible change in weather, particularly the coming of heavy rain or hard frost. Another example is if a cat curls up with its forehead touching the ground, it indicates that storms will happen in the near future.

== See also ==
- Cultural depictions of cats
