= Nggam =

Cameroonian divination using spiders or crabs

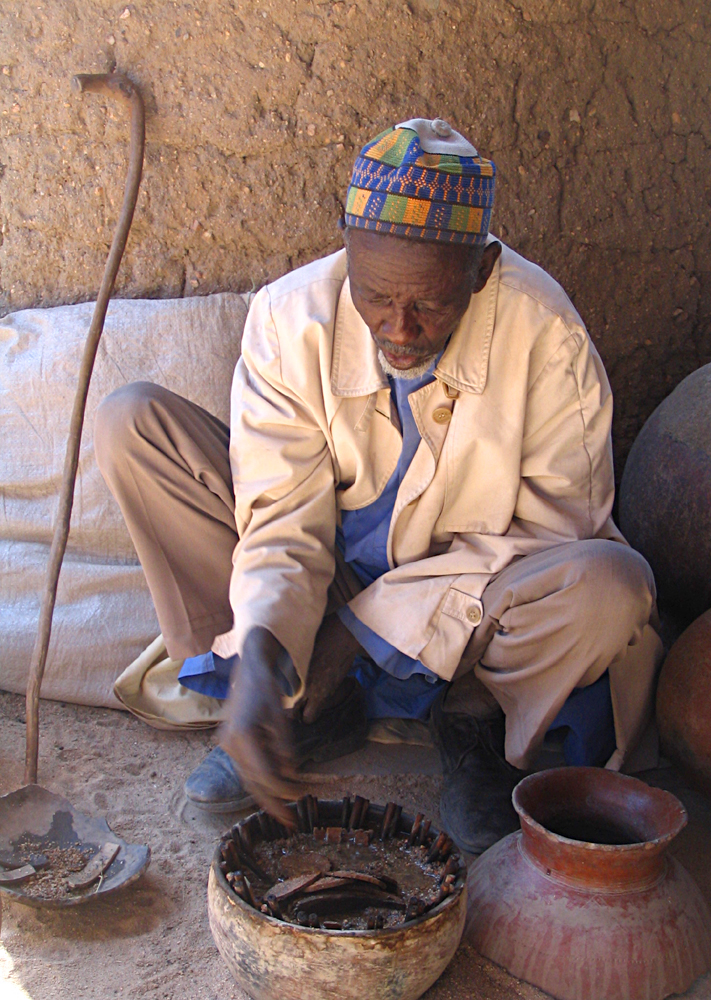
A man practicing Nggam with a crab

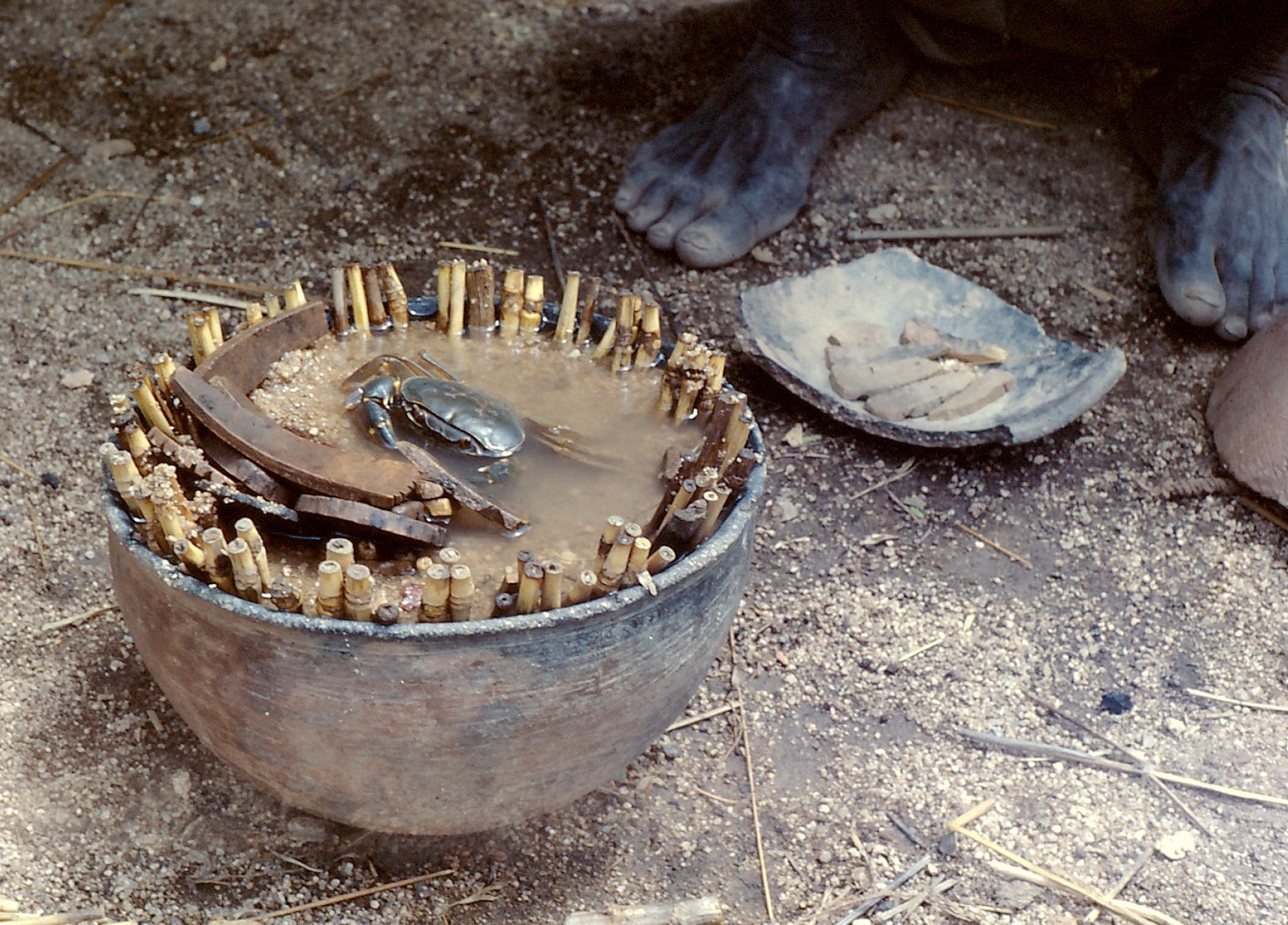
A crab in a divination pot

Nggam ([ŋgam]) is a type of divination found among many groups in western Cameroon. Among the best documented is its practice by the Mambila people of Cameroon and Nigeria, in which the actions of spiders or crabs are interpreted by the diviner. The form used by the neighbouring Yamba people was described by Gebauer, in 1964 based on experience in Mbem, going back to before 1939, and more recently by Hermann Gufler (1996 and 2003). Good documentation of Nggam has also been published for the Bekpak (Bafia) people by Dugast and Leiderer and for the Bamileke people by Pradeles de Latour. The crab form has been studied in north Cameroon by Walter van Beek (2013, 2015).

The comparative linguistics of spider divination in Cameroon was surveyed by Blench and Zeitlyn in 1989/1990.

In 2021, Argentinian artist Tomás Saraceno developed a project and website where you can learn about the practices of the Nggam dù spider diviners. On the website, videos show the methods the diviners use to answer people’s questions; it also shows interviews with diviners who all live in the village of Somié, Cameroon.

The Mambila form of nggam featured in the 2024-2025 exhibition, "Oracles, Omens and Answers" at the Weston Library, the University of Oxford, and there is a chapter about it in the related book. In August 2025 an article on Mambila Spider Divination was published in Aeon

== See also ==
- African divination
