= Cromniomancy =

Divination by onions

Cromniomancy is divination by onions. It is usually done by interpreting their sprouting behavior, after some kind of ritual to state the topic of the divination. This often involves inscribing the onions, dedicating them on an altar or something similar. But cromniomancy is/was also done in idiosyncratic way not involving sprouting them.

It is not known why the onion was chosen for that kind of divination, as opposed to other fast-sprouting plants. Comparing other divination methods shows that plants used for divination have or had some significance as important food source and/or as medicinal herbs. The onion is rich in vitamin C and was important because of this, and it was widely used as medicinal herb against colds and other infections.

== Etymology ==
The word is derived from the Ancient Greek word for onion = κρόμμυον(phonetically crom-mee-on) and oracle = μαντεία (phonetically man-dee-ah).

== History ==
Cromniomancy was historically performed across Europe, Africa and northern Asia. The sphere within a sphere of the onion made it a much-revered symbol of spirituality and eternity, to the extent that the ancient Egyptians took their sacred oaths with their right hand on an onion. There are many forms of cromniomancy, from divining the weather by the thickness of the skin, to gaining inside information.

The earliest written mention occurs in Burton's The Anatomy of Melancholy, referring to cromniomancies as a custom of laying onions on an altar on Christmas Eve in order to divine when someone will be married.

== Specific methods ==
One method is to place onions on a sacred altar to learn about friends and family far away and out of contact. The names of the beloved are inscribed on individual onions and left undisturbed until they began to sprout. The faster the sprouting, the better health and happiness was enjoyed by the friend named on the onion.

Onions also provided romantic advice for the love-lorn. A woman trying to choose between lovers would carve out their names on separate onions. According to tradition, the onion that sprouted first was believed to unveil the suitor deemed most deserving of her affections. The one that sprouted first would reveal the suitor most worthy of her affections. Some sources have it that this should best be done on December 1.

Answers to any question could be sought by inscribing yes and no on two separate onions and planting them to see which sprouted first.

A method practiced in southern Germany to predict the weather for the following year goes like this: At Silvester evening twelve big, sphere-like pieces of onion are taken and put on a wooden board in a row. They represent the months from January to December. Then a grain of salt is put into every piece of onion, and the whole thing is left overnight in a room without heating, but without frost. The amount of liquid in every onion piece tells how much rain/snow there will be in the respective month.
