= Molybdomancy =

Divination technique using molten metal

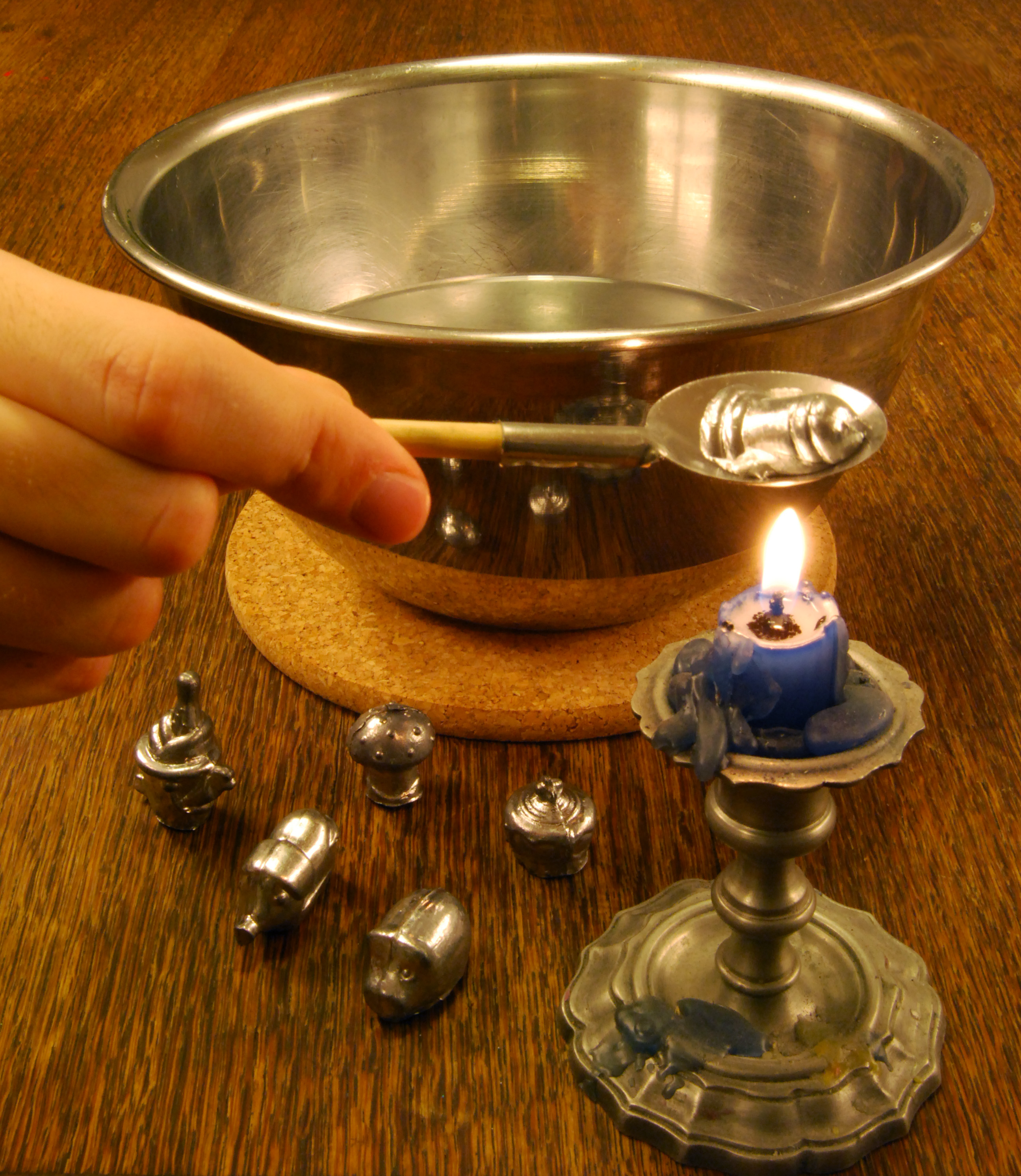
A molybdomancy kit includes a set of shaped lead ingots, to be melted over a candle flame in a spoon.

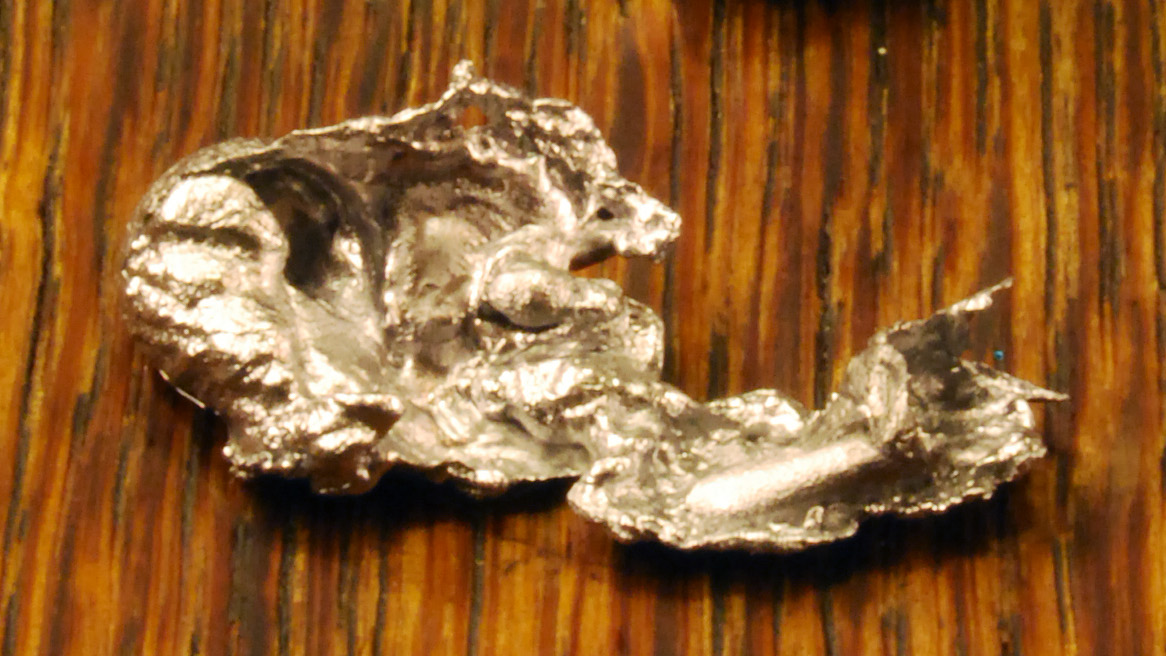
A piece of molten lead after immersion in cold water

Molybdomancy (from Ancient Greek: μόλυβδος, romanized: molybdos, lit. 'lead' and -mancy) is a technique of divination using molten metal. Typically, molten lead or tin is dropped into water. It can be found as a tradition in various cultures, including Austria, Bosnia and Herzegovina, Bulgaria, Germany, Finland, Estonia, Latvia, Switzerland, the Czech Republic, and Turkey. Some versions have been found to have potentially harmful effects on human health.

== Method ==
Lead (or more recently tin) shapes are melted in a ladle over a flame, and the molten liquid is then poured into the water. The resulting shape is either directly interpreted as an omen for the future, or is rotated in a candlelight to create shadows, whose shapes are then interpreted. The shapes are interpreted symbolically, for example a bubbly surface signifying money, a fragile or broken shape misfortune. The shape of the lead before melting can refer to a specific area of one's life. For example, ships for traveling, keys for career advancement, etc.

== Finland ==
In Finland, the tradition is to tell the fortunes on New Year's Eve by melting "tin" in a ladle on the stove and throwing it quickly in a bucket of cold water. The practice is known as uudenvuodentina. Shops sell ladles and small bullions in the shape of a horseshoe for this express purpose. The shapes are often interpreted not only literally, but also symbolically: a bubbly surface refers to money, a fragile or broken shape misfortune. Ships refer to travelling, keys to career advancement, a basket to a good mushroom year, and a horse to a new car.

Originally made from lead and tin, since 2018 the bullion have been mostly made from lead free tin, after Tukes (Safety and chemicals agency) banned the use of lead in "uudenvuodentina".

The world's largest uudenvuodentina, 41 kilograms (90 lb), was cast by members of the Valko volunteer fire department in Loviisa, Finland, in New Year 2010.

== Germany, Austria, and Switzerland ==
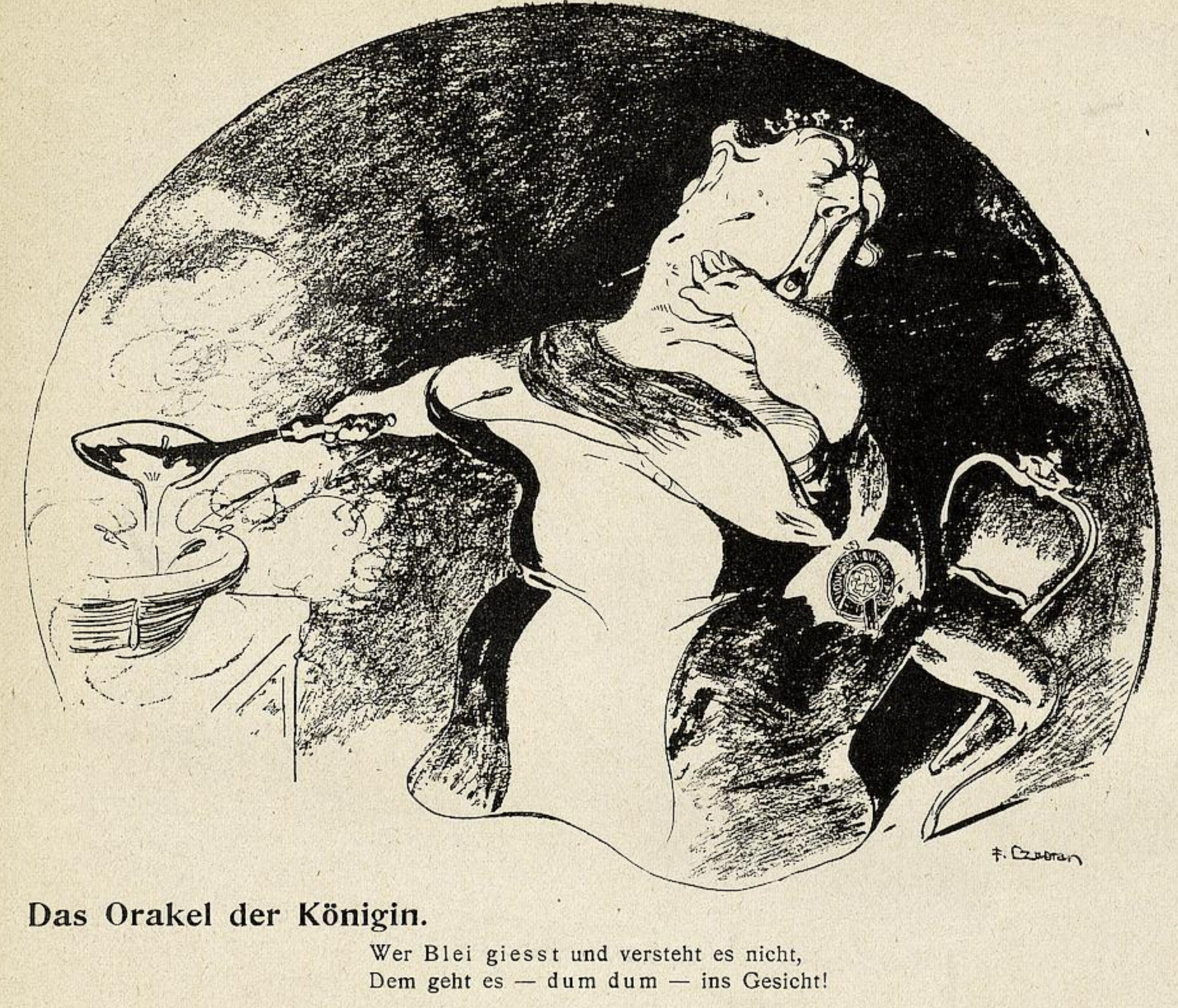
A cartoon depicting Bleigießen (1900)

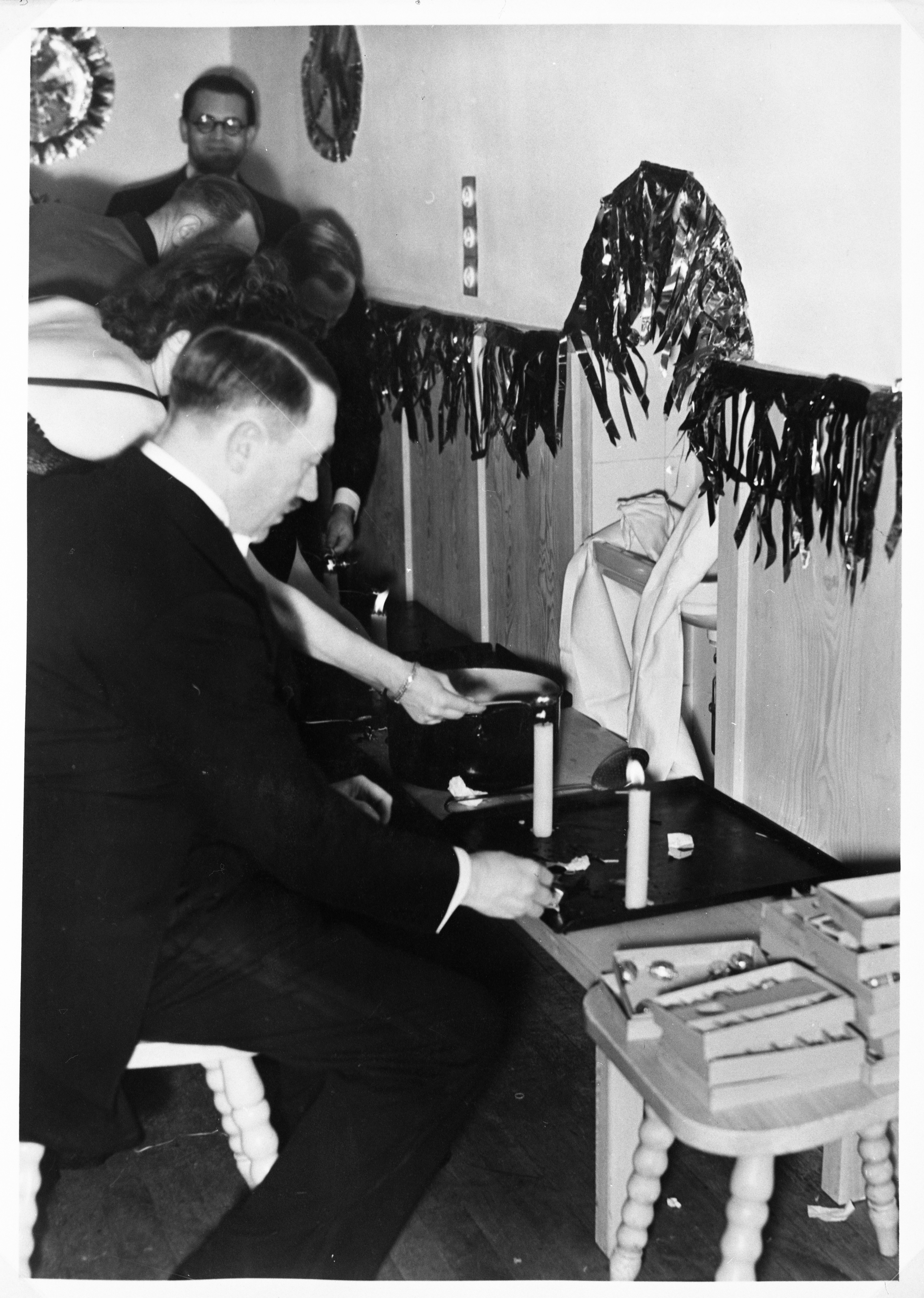
Adolf Hitler tries the Bleigießen at the Berghof on New Year's Eve 1938/1939.

Bleigießen (literally "lead pouring") is a traditional activity held at the New Year to predict the fortune of the coming year. The different resulting shapes are identified based on their resemblance to any of various objects, animals, and structures, each with its own interpretation. EU regulations passed in 2018 limit the sale of toxic lead-containing products, including molybdomancy kits. Tin may be substituted for lead. Carromancy, or dripping molten wax into water, is also a substitute. In the Czech Republic molybdomancy is one of the traditional Christmas traditions.

== Turkey ==
The tradition of molybdomancy is called kurşun dökme in Turkish (literally, "lead casting", "lead pouring") which is intended to help with various spiritual problems or predict the future. The rituals vary, but they involve pouring molten lead into water. Researchers from Ankara University performed a study of the effects of this tradition on the health of women. They reported risks of antimony poisoning and lead poisoning.

A similar traditional practice is used in Bosnia and Herzegovina.

== Jewish folk medicine ==
In Yiddish folk medicine, the segula of Bley-gisn (Yiddish: בּליי־גיסן) involves a practitioner, usually female, reciting a psalm or an incantation, and then pouring molten lead into a vessel full of water. It has been used for divination, the removal of the evil eye, and in cases of illness in pregnant women and children which are believed to be due to fright to determine the cause of fear.

"According to instructions scattered across various ethnographic collections, a bowl of water would be placed by the patient’s head or on their belly, and the substance would be melted on a teaspoon and poured over the twigs of a besom onto the surface of the water three times. The pouring action would be accompanied by a variety of magical formulas, often derived from the local language."

== See also ==
- Methods of divination
