= Botanomancy =

Botanomancy is the art of divination by burning branches of trees or herbs. The most common branches used are vervain and briar. The fire and the smoke are both read to indicate which course of action should be taken.
