= Gyromancy =

Method of divination

Gyromancy is a method of divination in which a person spins around inside or walks the circumference of a circle drawn on the ground, the perimeter of which is marked with the letters of an alphabet. The divination is inferred from the letter at the position where the person either stumbles or falls across the circle's edge. The person would repeat the practice "till he evolved an intelligible sentence, or till death or madness intervened." The dizziness brought on by spinning or circling is intended to introduce randomness or to facilitate an altered state of consciousness.

The word is derived from Medieval Latin, gyromantia, which is derived from Greek gyros (circle) and manteia (oracle).

Gyromancy is mentioned in the PlayStation video game Silent Hill.
