= List of occult terms =

The occult is a category of supernatural beliefs and practices, encompassing such phenomena as those involving mysticism, spirituality, and magic in terms of any otherworldly agency. It can also refer to other non-religious supernatural ideas like extra-sensory perception and parapsychology.

The occult (from the Latin word occultus "clandestine, hidden, secret") is "knowledge of the hidden". In common usage, occult refers to "knowledge of the paranormal", as opposed to "knowledge of the measurable", usually referred to as science. The term is sometimes taken to mean knowledge that "is meant only for certain people" or that "must be kept hidden", but for most practicing occultists it is simply the study of a deeper spiritual reality that extends beyond pure reason and the physical sciences. The terms esoteric and arcane can also be used to describe the occult, in addition to their meanings unrelated to the supernatural. The term occult sciences was used in the 16th century to refer to astrology, alchemy, and natural magic, which today are considered pseudosciences.

The term occultism emerged in 19th-century France, where it came to be associated with various French esoteric groups connected to Éliphas Lévi and Papus, and in 1875 was introduced into the English language by the esotericist Helena Blavatsky. Throughout the 20th century, the term was used idiosyncratically by a range of different authors, but by the 21st century was commonly employed – including by academic scholars of esotericism – to refer to a range of esoteric currents that developed in the mid-19th century and their descendants. Occultism is thus often used to categorise such esoteric traditions as Spiritualism, Theosophy, Anthroposophy, the Hermetic Order of the Golden Dawn, and New Age.

It also describes a number of magical organizations or orders, the teachings and practices taught by them, and to a large body of current and historical literature and spiritual philosophy related to this subject.

== A ==
- Abacomancy
- Abracadabra, an ancient word in an unknown language popularly carved onto amulets in antiquity
- Abramelin oil
- Acultomancy, divination by the use of needles
- Adept
- Aeon (Thelema)
- Aeromancy
- Air (classical element), one of the four classical elements that play a role in alchemy
- Agalmatomancy
- Agartha, a land at the center of the Earth
- AGLA
- Aichmomancy
- Ailuromancy, divination by the movements of cats
- Akasha, thought to be the fifth element in many forms of Neopaganism
- Akashic records
- Alchemical elements
- Alchemical symbols
- Alchemy
- Alectryomancy
- Alembic
- Alkahest
- Alomancy
- Alphabet of Desire
- Alphitomancy
- Alveromancy
- Aludel
- Ambix
- Ambulomancy
- Amniomancy
- Amulet, see also New Testament amulet
- Anachitis, a form of divination stone
- Anemomancy
- Angel number, repeating numbers believed to have special meaning by numerologists.
- Anthomancy, divination using flowers
- Anthracomancy
- Anthropomancy
- Anthroposcopy
- Anthroposophy
- Apantomancy
- Apotropaic magic
- Apotropaic mark
- Apparitions - See Ghost
- Aqua fortis - Old alchemical term for nitric acid.
- Aqua ragia - Old alchemical term for turpentine.
- Aqua regia - Mixture of aqua fortis and spirit of salt.
- Aquarius, an astrological sign
- Aqua vitae - Old alchemical term for ethanol.
- Arachnomancy
- Arcandam
- Archaeomancy, divination through the use of special relics
- Archdemon, a powerful demon in some spiritual writings
- Argenteum Astrum
- Aries, an astrological sign
- Ariolation, soothsaying or prophecy
- Ariosophy
- Arithmancy
- Armanen runes, runes created by the Austrian occultist Guido von List, which he claimed to represent a series of alleged Aryan mythical kings
- Armomancy, divination through a person's arm or shoulders
- Ascendant (astrology)
- Ascended master
- Aspidomancy
- Astragalomancy
- Astragyromancy, divination by dice or characters marked for special purposes
- Astrapomancy, divination by lighting
- Astral projection, see also Soul flight
- Astral religion
- Astrological age
- Astrological aspect
- Astrological progression
- Astrological symbols
- Astrological transit
- Astrology
- Athame
- Athanor
- Atlantis
- Augury
- Aura
- Auramancy, divination using the aura
- Austromancy, divination using the wind
- Automatic writing
- Avimancy, divination by birds
- Axinomancy
- Axiom of Maria

== B ==
- Banishing
- Baphomet
- Bibliomancy
- Black magic
- Black Mass
- Black Sun
- Body of light
- Boline
- Book of shadows

== C ==
- Cartomancy (divination using playing cards)
- Centiloquium
- Ceremonial magic (or magick) (sometimes seen as "high magic", and set in contrast to "sorcery" or "low magic")
- Chaos magic
- Charmstone
- Chinese astrology
- Chromotherapy
- Clairaudience (ability to hear voices & sounds super-normally- spirited voices alleging to be those of dead people giving advice or warnings)
- Clairsentience (supernormal sense perception)
- Clairvoyance (ability to see objects or events spontaneously or supernormally above their normal range of vision- second sight)
- Classical elements (astrology) - The classical Greek elements as used in astrology. Other occult uses of the classical elements include their uses in alchemy.
- Cleromancy
- Coco (folklore)
- Color therapy see Chromotherapy
- Cone of power
- Conjuration (summoning up a spirit by incantation)
- Coven (a community of witches)
- Crossroads (folklore)
- Crystal gazing, see also Scrying
- Cult
- Cunning folk traditions and the Latter Day Saint movement
- Curse

== D ==
- Deal with the Devil
- Demonology
- Devil, see also Satan
- Divination
- Dowsing
- Dream interpretation
- Dybbuk (Hebrew)

== E ==
- Earth mysteries
- Esbat
- Ectoplasm (unknown substance from body of a medium)
- Egyptian gods
- Elemental
- Enchantment
- Energy (esotericism)
- English Qaballa
- Enochian
- E.S.P. (extra sensory perception)
- Esoteric cosmology
- Esotericism
- Evil eye
- Evocation
- Exorcism

== F ==
- Fama Fraternitatis
- Familiar spirit
- Feng shui (Chinese)
- Feri Tradition
- Florida Water
- Flying ointment
- Folk belief
- Folk religion
- Four-leaf clover
- Fortune-telling

== G ==
- Galdr (Old Norse)
- Gematria, see also Numerology
- Geomancy
- Geomantic figures
- Ghouls (Arabian)
- Ghost hunting
- Gnome
- Gnosis (chaos magic)
- Goetia
- Golem (Hebrew)
- Gradobranitelj
- Graphology
- Gray magic
- Great Work (alchemy)
- Great Work (Hermeticism)
- Greater and lesser magic
- Grimoire

== H ==
- Hadit
- Hamingja (Norse)
- Hamsa
- Hand of Glory
- Haruspex
- Haunted
- Hedgewitch
- Hermeticism
- Hexagram
- Hex
- Holy anointing oil, see also Anointing
- Homunculus
- Hoodoo
- Huaychivo, (Mayan)
- Huna

== I ==
- I Ching
- Ifa
- Imp
- Incantation
- Incubus, see also Succubus
- Initiation

== J ==
- Jinx
- Jumbee (Colombian, Venezuela, Caribbean)
- Juju

== K ==
- Kabbalah
- Karzełek (Slavic)
- Kia (magic)
- Kirlian photography

== L ==
- Lamen (magic)
- Lampadomancy
- Law of contagion
- Left-hand path and right-hand path
- Ley line
- Lesser banishing ritual of the pentagram
- Literomancy
- Lithomancy
- Lemures (Roman)
- Lucifer
- Luciferianism
- Lycanthrope

== M ==
- Magic (supernatural)
- Magic circle
- Magic spell
- Magic square
- Magic word
- Magical formula
- Magical thinking
- Major Arcana
- Mathers table
- Mediumship
- Mephistopheles
- Mesmerism
- Metoposcopy; see also Phrenology, Physiognomy
- Mojo (African-American culture), see also Sachet
- Molybdomancy

== N ==
- Nagual
- Native American traditions
- Necromancy
- Necronomicon
- Neopaganism
- Neotantra, see also tantra
- Noa-name (Polynesian)
- Nuit
- Numen (Latin)
- Numerology, see also Gematria

== O ==
- Obeah and wanga
- Obsession (Spiritism), see also Spirit possession
- Omen
- Oneiromancy
- Oneironautics
- Onychomancy
- Osculum infame
- Ouija
- Ouroboros

== P ==
- Palmistry
- Paranormal
- Parapsychology
- Pentacle
- Pharaoh
- Philosopher's stone
- Phrenology, see also Metoposcopy
- Physiognomy, see also Metoposcopy
- Planetary hours
- Planchette
- Poltergeist
- Poppet
- Potion
- Power animal
- Pow-wow (folk magic)
- Precognition, see also Retrocognition
- Psionics
- Psychic
- Psychic surgery
- Psychic vampire
- Psychopomp
- Psychonautics
- Psychometry
- Pyramid power

== Q ==
- Qabalah
- Qareen
- Qlippoth

== R ==
- Radiesthesia
- Radionics
- Reiki
- Renaissance magic
- Retrocognition, see also Precognition
- Rhabdomancy
- Rose Cross
- Rosicrucianism
- Rougarou, see also Werewolf
- Runecasting
- Runestone
- Runic magic
- Rusalka (Slavic)

== S ==
- Salamander, see Cultural depictions of salamanders
- Satan, see also Devil
- Satanic panic
- Satanism
- Scrying, see also Crystal gazing
- Séance
- Secret Chiefs
- Seer stone (Latter Day Saints)
- Seeress (Germanic)
- Seidr (Old Norse)
- Selkie (Celtic & Norse)
- Sefirot
- Seven rays
- Sex magic
- Shachihoko (Japanese)
- Shadow person
- Shamanic practices
- Shem HaMephorash (Hebrew)
- Sidereal and tropical astrology
- Sigil
- Sigil of Baphomet
- Sigillum Dei
- Simiyya (Islamic)
- Simurgh (Persian)
- Skin-walker
- Soul flight, see also Astral projection
- Spell
- Spirit possession, see also Obsession (Spiritism)
- Stregheria
- Subtle body
- Succubus, see also Incubus
- Supernatural
- Sylph
- Sympathetic magic
- Synchromysticism

== T ==
- Table of correspondences
- Talisman
- Tantric religion
- Taoism and death
- Tau robe
- Tarot divination
- Tattva vision
- Thaumaturgy
- Theurgy
- Tools, see Magical tools in Wicca
- Tree of Life

== U ==
- Underworld
- Undine
- Unicursal hexagram
- Ukehi (Jap.)

== V ==
- Valkyrie (Norse)
- Vampire
- Vastu shastra, East Indian version of Feng Shui (geomancy)
- Vision (spirituality)
- Vitalism
- Vlach (Balkan)
- Voodoo death
- Voodoo doll
- Vril

== W ==
- Wand
- White magic
- Wicca
- Witchcraft
- Witches' Sabbath
- Witch ball
- Witchcraft and divination in the Hebrew Bible
- Will-o'-the-wisp
- Werewolf, see also Rougarou
- Wendigo

== Y ==
- Ya sang
- Yowie (Aust. abor.)

== Z ==
- Zener cards
- Zodiac
- Zombie (Hatian)
- Zos Kia Cultus

== See also ==
- Astrology and alchemy
- Astrology and numerology
- List of alchemists
- List of astrologers
- List of channelers
- List of lucky symbols
- List of occultists
- List of occult symbols
- List of psychic abilities
- List of theological demons
- Methods of divination
- Outline of alchemy
