= Bārû =

Mesopotamian form of divination

A bārû, in ancient Mesopotamian religion, is a practitioner of a form of divination based on hepatoscopy, reading of omens from a liver of a sacrificial animal, known as bārûtu. Baru began the divination ceremony by first addressing the oracle gods, Šamaš and Adad, with prayers and benedictions, requesting them to "write" their message upon the entrails of the sacrificial animal. During the Sumerian period, the predictions offered by the divination ceremony were in a form of binary, yes or no answers. In the late Assyrian period, the method evolved to predict specific events, that were in turn considered to be either favorable or unfavorable. The totals of favorable and unfavorable events were tallied to generate either a positive or a negative verdict. Divinations of baru were not universally trusted and there is evidence that Sennacherib separated baru into groups to avoid collusion in situations that necessitated reliable reports to important questions.

== See also ==
- Haruspex
