= Ancient Mesopotamian religion =

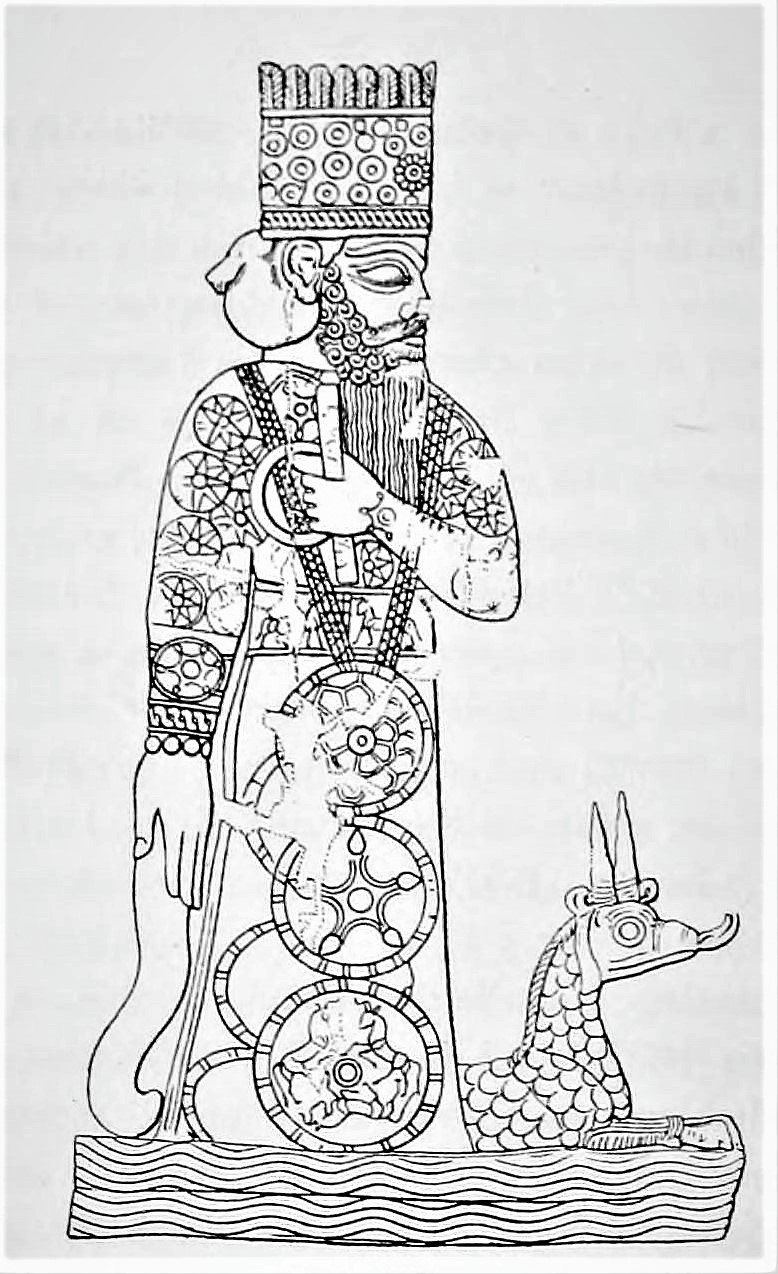
The god Marduk and his dragon Mušḫuššu

Ancient Mesopotamian religion encompasses the religious beliefs (concerning the gods, creation and the cosmos, the origin of humanity, and so forth) and practices of the civilizations of ancient Mesopotamia, particularly Sumer, Akkad, Assyria and Babylonia between circa 6000 BC and 500 AD. The religious development of Mesopotamia and Mesopotamian culture in general, especially in the south, were not particularly influenced by the movements of the various peoples into and throughout the general area of West Asia. Rather, Mesopotamian religion was a consistent and coherent tradition, which adapted to the internal needs of its adherents over millennia of development.

The earliest undercurrents of Mesopotamian religious thought are believed to have developed in Mesopotamia in the 6th millennium BC, coinciding with when the region began to be permanently settled with urban centres. The earliest evidence of Mesopotamian religion dates to the mid-4th millennium BC, coincides with the invention of writing, and involved the worship of forces of nature as providers of sustenance. Although, Sumerian and Akkadian peoples in ancient Mesopotamia had been worshipping some form of a mother goddess (Ninhursag) starting in the Ubaid Period (c. 5500–3700 BCE) In the 3rd millennium BC, objects of worship were personified and became an expansive cast of divinities with particular functions. The last stages of Mesopotamian polytheism, which developed in the 2nd and 1st millennia BC, introduced greater emphasis on personal religion and structured the gods into a monarchical hierarchy, with the national god of each state being the head of the pantheon. Mesopotamian religion finally declined with the Christianization of Mesopotamia between the 1st and 5th centuries AD.

== History ==
Overview map of ancient Mesopotamia.

The earliest undercurrents of Mesopotamian religious thought are believed to have developed in the first half of the 6th millennium BC, at the time people first began to permanently settle in Mesopotamia owing to improved irrigation. The religious developments of the region are unknown since they preceded the invention of writing. The first evidence for what is recognisably Mesopotamian religion can be seen with the invention in Mesopotamia of writing circa 3500 BC.

The people of Mesopotamia originally consisted of two groups, East Semitic speakers of Akkadian and the people of Sumer, who spoke Sumerian, a language isolate. These peoples were members of various city-states and small kingdoms. The Sumerians left the first records and are believed to have been the founders of the civilization of the Ubaid period (6500 BC to 3800 BC) in Upper Mesopotamia. By historical times they resided mostly in southern Mesopotamia, which was known as Sumer (and much later, Babylonia), and had considerable influence on the Akkadian speakers and their culture. Akkadian speakers are believed to have entered the region at some point between 4000 BC and 3000 BC, with Akkadian names first appearing in the regnal lists of these states c. 29th century BC.

The Sumerians were advanced: as well as inventing writing, they developed early forms of mathematics, early wheeled vehicles/chariots, astronomy, astrology, written code of law, organised medicine, advanced agriculture and architecture, and the calendar. They created the first city-states such as Uruk, Ur, Lagash, Isin, Kish, Umma, Eridu, Adab, Akshak, Sippar, Nippur and Larsa, each of them ruled by an ensí.

The Sumerians remained largely dominant in this synthesised culture until the rise of the Akkadian Empire under Sargon of Akkad circa 2335 BC, which united all of Mesopotamia under one ruler and conquered areas of Anatolia, Levant and Ancient Iran. There was increasing syncretism between the Sumerian and Akkadian cultures and deities, with the Akkadian speakers typically preferring to worship fewer deities but elevating them to greater positions of power.

=== Effect on political structure ===
Like many nations in Mesopotamian history, Akkadian-speaking Assyria was originally, to a great extent, an oligarchy rather than a monarchy. From the 21st century BC authority was considered to lie with "the city", and the polity had three main centres of power—an assembly of elders, a hereditary ruler, and an eponym. The ruler presided over the assembly and carried out its decisions. He was not referred to with the usual Akkadian term for "king", šarrum; that was instead reserved for the city's patron deity Ashur, of whom the ruler was the high priest. The ruler was only designated as "steward of Assur" (iššiak Assur), where the term for steward is a borrowing from Sumerian ensí. The third centre of power was the eponym (limmum), who gave the year his name, similarly to the eponymous archon and Roman consuls of classical antiquity. He was annually elected by lot and was responsible for the economic administration of the city, which included the power to detain people and confiscate property. The institution of the eponym as well as the formula iššiak Assur lingered on as ceremonial vestiges of this early system throughout the history of the Assyrian monarchy.

=== Neo-Assyrian Empire ===
The religion of the Neo-Assyrian Empire centered around the Assyrian king as the king of their lands as well. However, kingship at the time was linked very closely with the idea of divine mandate. The Assyrian king, while not a god, was acknowledged as the chief servant of the chief god, Ashur. In this manner, the king's authority was seen as absolute so long as the high priest reassured the peoples that the gods—or in the case of the henotheistic Assyrians, the god—were pleased with the current ruler. For the Assyrians who lived in Assur and the surrounding lands, this system was the norm. For the conquered peoples, however, it was novel, particularly to the people of smaller city-states. In time, Ashur was promoted from being the local deity of Assur to the overlord of the vast Assyrian domain, which spread from the Caucasus and Armenia in the north to Egypt, Nubia and the Arabian Peninsula in the south, and from Cyprus and the eastern Mediterranean Sea in the west to central Iran in the east. Ashur, the patron deity of the city of Assur from the late Bronze Age, was in constant rivalry with the patron deity of the fellow Akkadian speaking state of Babylonia, Marduk. Worship was conducted in his name throughout the lands dominated by the Assyrians. With the worship of Ashur across much of the Fertile Crescent, the Assyrian king could command the loyalty of his fellow servants of Ashur.

=== Later Mesopotamian history ===
In 539 BC, Mesopotamia was conquered by the Achaemenid Empire (539–332 BC), then ruled by Cyrus the Great. This brought to an end over 3,000 years of Mesopotamian dominance of the Near East. The Persians maintained and did not interfere in the native culture and religion and Assyria and Babylon continued to exist as entities (although Chaldea and the Chaldeans disappeared), and Assyria was strong enough to launch major rebellions against the Achaemenids in 522 and 482 BC. During this period the Syriac language and Syriac alphabet evolved in Assyria among the Assyrian people, and were centuries later to be the vehicle for the spread of Syriac Christianity throughout the near east.

Then, two centuries later in 330 BC, the Macedonian emperor Alexander the Great overthrew the Persians and took control of Mesopotamia. After Alexander's death, increased Hellenistic influence was brought to the region by the Seleucid Empire. Assyria and Babylonia later became provinces under the Parthian Empire (Achaemenid Assyria and province of Babylonia), Rome (province of Assyria) and Sasanian Empire (province of Asoristan). Babylonia was dissolved as an entity during the Parthian Empire, though Assyria endured as a geopolitical entity until the Muslim conquest of Persia in the 7th century AD, while the Assyrian people are still present today.

During the Parthian Empire there was a major revival in Assyria between the 2nd century BC and 4th century AD, with temples once more being dedicated to gods such as Ashur, Sin, Shamash, Hadad, Bel and Ishtar in various Assyrian vassal states in Mesopotamia, while Christianity was introduced from the 2nd century AD and Assyria became the centre of the Assyrian founded Church of the East and a major centre of the Syriac Orthodox Church.

In the third century AD, Manichaeism developed, which incorporated elements of Christianity, Judaism, Buddhism, Zoroastrianism, and local Mesopotamian religion.

== Mythology ==
=== Cosmology ===
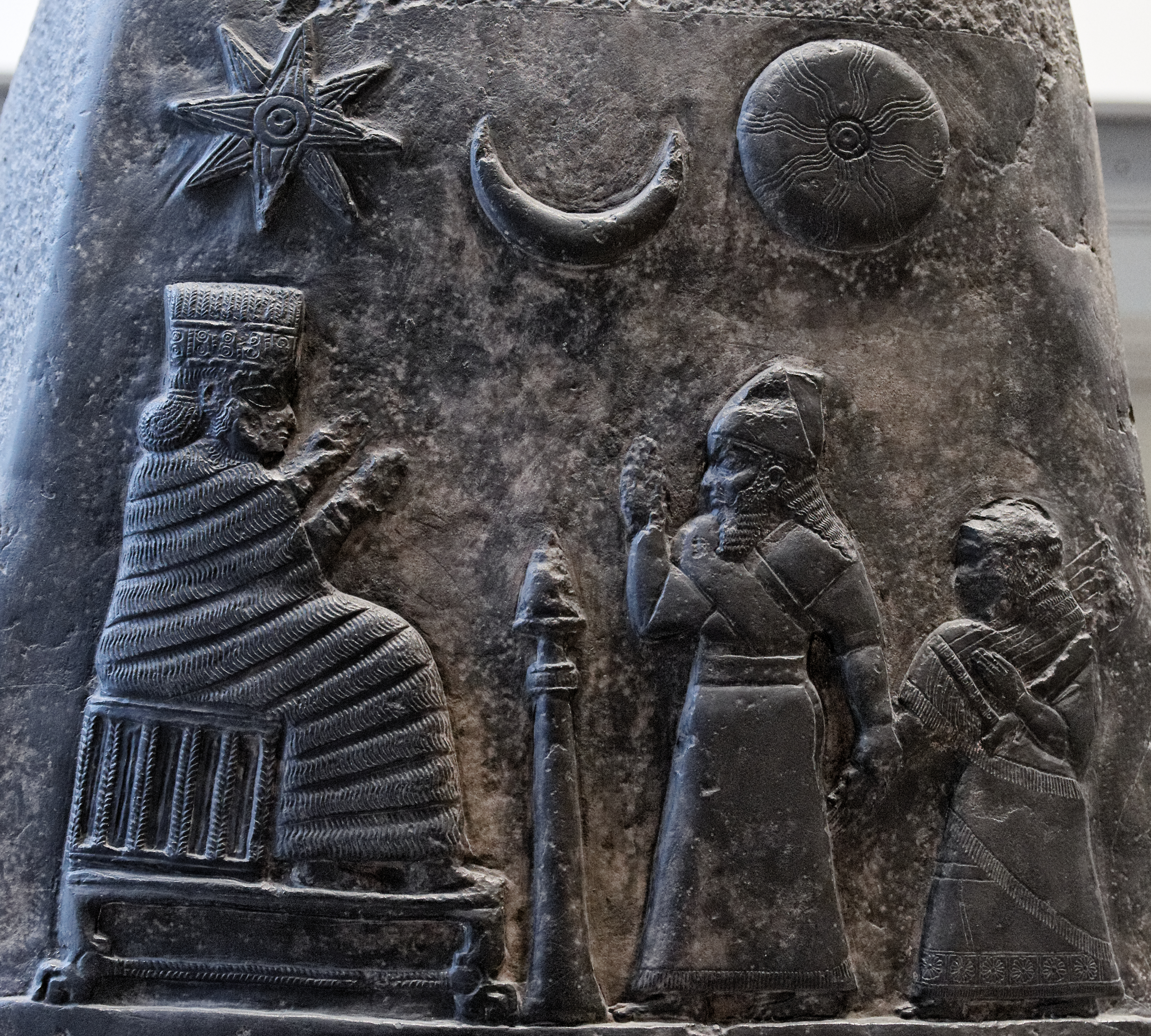
Meli-Shipak II presenting his daughter Ḫunnubat-Nanaya to the goddess Nanaya. The eight-pointed star represents Inanna-Ishtar, alongside the solar disk of her brother Shamash and the crescent of her father Sin. Boundary stone of Meli-Shipak II, dating to the twelfth century BC.

With the exception of the Enuma Elish, there are no surviving records that systematically explain Mesopotamian cosmology. Nonetheless, modern scholars have reconstructed a roughly accurate depiction from the surviving evidence, including Sumerian and Akkadian cuneiform and the Hebrew Bible. In the Enuma Elish (c. 12th century BCE), the god Marduk kills Tiamat, the mother of the gods, and from the two halves of her carcass, he constructs the heavens and the earth to shape the modern observable cosmos. A document from a similar period stated that the heavens and the earth can each be divided into three layers. The gods dwell in the higher levels of heaven, with the stars being fixed into the lowermost heavenly layer.

=== Deities ===
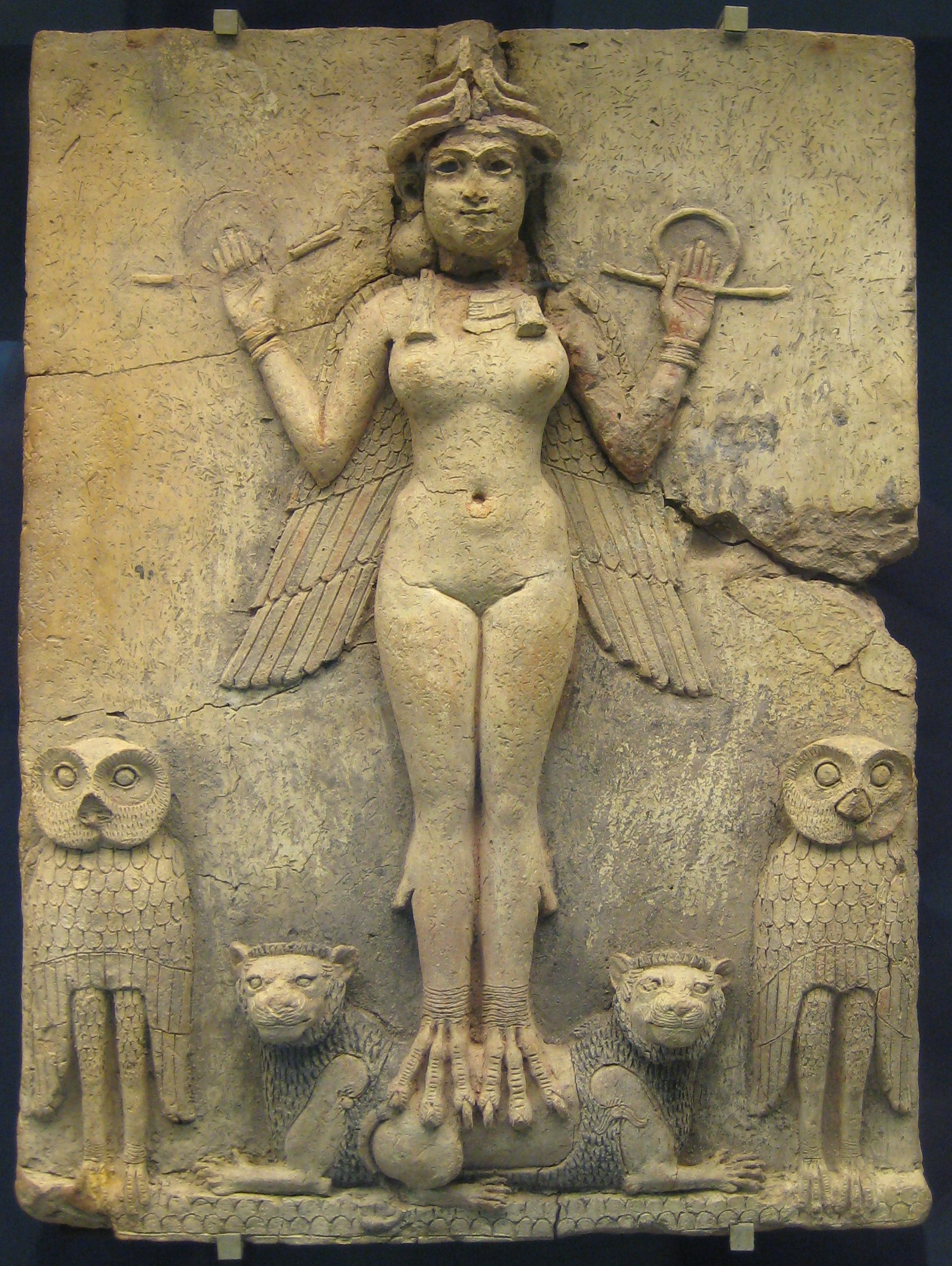
The "Burney Relief", which is speculated to represent either Ishtar or her older sister Ereshkigal (c. 19th or 18th century BCE)

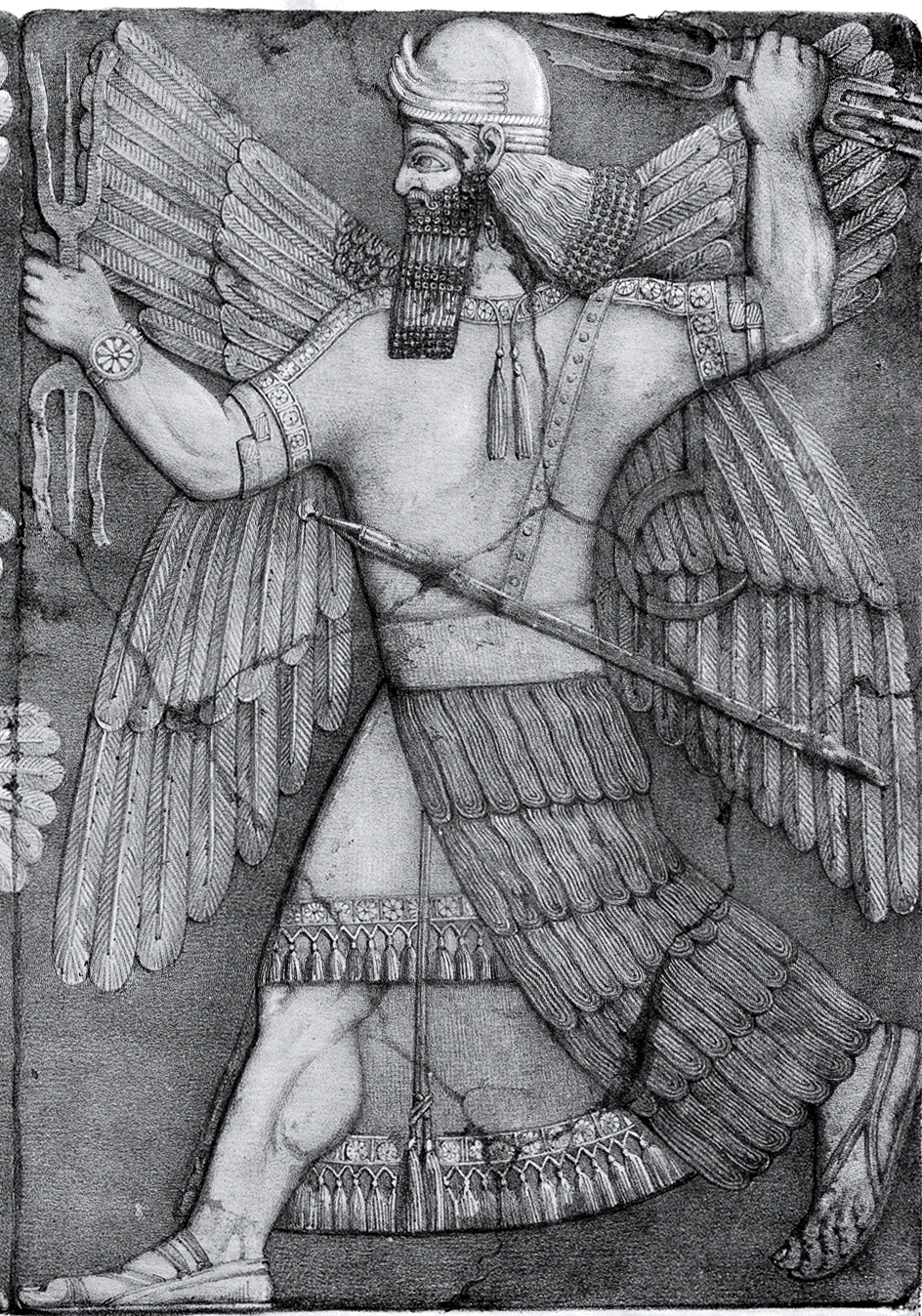
Monumental stone relief from the temple of Ninurta at Kalhu, depicting the god Ninurta, (c. 883–859 BCE)

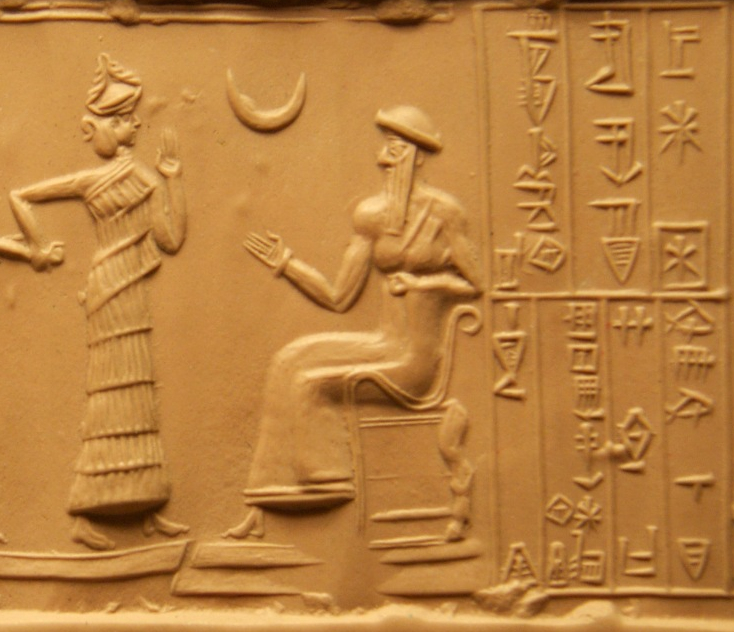
Impression of the cylinder seal of Ḫašḫamer, ensi. The seated figure is probably king Ur-Nammu, bestowing the governorship on Ḫašḫamer, who is led before him by the goddess Lamma. Nanna himself is indicated in the form of a crescent (c. 2100 BCE)

Mesopotamian religion was polytheistic, thereby accepting the existence of many different deities, both male and female, though it was also henotheistic, with certain gods being viewed as superior to others by their specific devotees. These devotees were often from a particular city or city-state that held that deity as its tutelary deity; for instance, Enki was often associated with the city of Eridu in Sumer, Assur with Assur and Assyria, Enlil with the Sumerian city of Nippur, Ishtar with the Assyrian city of Arbela, and the god Marduk with Babylon. Though the full number of gods and goddesses found in Mesopotamia is not known, K. Tallqvist in his Akkadische Götterepitheta (1938) counted around 2,400 that scholars know, most of which had Sumerian names. In the Sumerian language, the gods were referred to as dingir, while in the Akkadian language they were known as ilu and it seems that there was syncretism between the gods worshipped by the two groups, adopting one another's deities.

The Mesopotamian gods bore many similarities with humans. They were anthropomorphic, having humanoid form and often acting like humans, requiring food and drink, as well as drinking alcohol and subsequently suffering the effects of drunkenness, but were thought to have a higher degree of perfection than common people. They were thought to be more powerful, all-seeing and all-knowing, unfathomable, and, above all, immortal. One of their prominent features was a terrifying brightness (melammu) which surrounded them, producing an immediate reaction of awe and reverence among humanity. In many cases, the various deities were family relations of one another, a trait found in many other polytheistic religions. Historian J. Bottéro was of the opinion that the gods were not viewed mystically but were instead seen as high-up masters who had to be obeyed and feared, as opposed to loved and adored. Nonetheless, many Mesopotamians of all classes often had names that were devoted to a certain deity; this practice appeared to have begun in the 3rd millennium BCE among the Sumerians and was later adopted by the Akkadians, Assyrians and Babylonians.

Initially, the pantheon was not ordered, but later Mesopotamian theologians came up with the concept of ranking the deities in order of importance. A Sumerian list of around 560 deities that did this was uncovered at Farm and Tell Abû Ṣalābīkh and dated to c. 2600 BCE, ranking five primary deities as being of particular importance.

One of the most important of these early Mesopotamian deities was Enlil, who was originally a Sumerian divinity viewed as a king of the gods and a controller of the world, who was later adopted by the Akkadians. Another was the Sumerian god An, who served a similar role to Enlil and became known as Anu among the Akkadians. The Sumerian god Enki was also adopted by the Akkadians, initially under his original name and later as Éa. Similarly the Sumerian moon god Nanna became the Akkadian Sîn while the Sumerian sun god Utu became the Akkadian Shamash. One of the most notable goddesses was the Sumerian sex and war deity Inanna. With the later rise to power of the Babylonians in the 18th century BCE, King Hammurabi declared Marduk, a deity who had not been of significant importance, to a position of supremacy alongside Anu and Enlil in southern Mesopotamia, although Marduk may have been modelled after the Sumerian storm-god Ninurta, whose exploits share great similarity.

Perhaps the most significant legend to survive from Mesopotamian religion is the Epic of Gilgamesh, which tells the story of the heroic king Gilgamesh and his wild friend Enkidu, and the former's search for immortality which is entwined with all the gods and their approval. It also contains the earliest reference to the Great Flood.

Akkadian religion sometimes took inspiration from influential Sumerian religious leaders and beliefs, and deified Sumerian kings at some points.

=== Methodological Approaches ===
A newly developed scientific discipline in the field of narrative studies, known as Hylistics, enables the systematic reconstruction of these and various hitherto unknown ancient Mesopotamian myths, along with their various historic layers and local variants. A recent comprehensive study of ancient Mesopotamian rituals and their correlations with myths reveals that a recurrent topic of Mesopotamian myths is that specific rituals are in the possession of certain gods and how these rituals came into the possession of other gods or how they were given by the gods to humankind.

== Rituals ==
From a Mesopotamian perspective, rituals (𒈨; Sumerian: me; Akkadian: parṣu) were considered to be the property of the deities. Only selected humans, who primarily served as priests or cultic experts at the temples, were entrusted with the knowledge of these rituals by the gods. When such rituals were performed, the respective deity was believed to be embodied in the person performing the ritual.

== Cultic practice ==
"Enlil! his authority is far-reaching; his word is sublime and holy. His decisions are unalterable; he decides fate forever! His eyes scrutinize the entire world!"

— A prayer to the god Enlil.

=== Public devotions ===
Each Mesopotamian city was home to a deity, and each of the prominent deities was the patron of a city, and all known temples were located in cities, though there may have been shrines in the suburbs. Temples were constructed of mud brick in the form of a ziggurat, which rose to the sky in a series of stairstep stages. Temple significance and symbolism have been the subject of much discussion, but most regard the tower as a kind of staircase or ladder for the god to descend from and ascend to the heavens, though there are signs which point towards an actual cult having been practiced in the upper temple, so the entire temple may have been regarded as an altar. Other theories treat the tower as an image of the cosmic mountain where a dying and rising god "lay buried." Some temples, such as the temple of Enki in Eridu contained a holy tree (kiskanu) in a sacred grove, which was the central point of various rites performed by the king, who functioned as a "master gardener."

Mesopotamian temples were originally built to serve as dwelling places for the god, who was thought to reside and hold court on earth for the good of the city and kingdom. His presence was symbolized by an image of the god in a separate room. The god's presence within the image seems to have been thought of in a very concrete way, as instruments for the presence of the deity. This is evident from the poem How Erra Wrecked the World, in which Erra deceived the god Marduk into leaving his cult statue. Once constructed, idols were consecrated through special nocturnal rituals where they were given "life", and their mouth "was opened" (pet pî) and washed (mes pî) so they could see and eat. If the deity approved, it would accept the image and agree to "inhabit" it. These images were also entertained, and sometime escorted on hunting expeditions. In order to service the gods, the temple was equipped with a household with kitchens and kitchenware, sleeping rooms with beds and side rooms for the deity's family, as well as a courtyard with a basin and water for cleansing visitors, as well as a stable for the god's chariot and draft animals.

Generally, the god's well-being was maintained through service, or work (dullu). The image was dressed and served banquets twice a day. It is not known how the god was thought to consume the food, but a curtain was drawn before the table while he or she "ate", just as the king himself was not allowed to be seen by the masses while he ate. Occasionally, the king shared in these meals, and the priests may have had some share in the offerings as well. Incense was also burned before the image, because it was thought that the gods enjoyed the smell. Sacrificial meals were also set out regularly, with a sacrificial animal seen as a replacement (pūhu) or substitute (dinānu) for a human, and it was considered that the anger of the gods or demons was then directed towards the sacrificial animal. Additionally, certain days required extra sacrifices and ceremonies for certain gods, and every day was sacred to a particular god.

The king was thought, in theory, to be the religious leader (enu or šangū) of the cult and exercised a large number of duties within the temple, with a large number of specialists whose task was to mediate between humans and gods: a supervising or "watchman" priest (šešgallu), priests for individual purification against demons and magicians (āšipu), priests for the purification of the temple (mašmašu), priests to appease the wrath of the gods with song and music (kalū), as well as female singers (nāru), male singers (zammeru), craftsmen (mārē ummāni), swordbearers (nāš paṭri), masters of divination (bārû), penitents (šā'ilu), and others.

=== Private devotions ===
Besides the worship of the gods at public rituals, individuals also paid homage to a personal deity. As with other deities, the personal gods changed over time and little is known about early practice as they are rarely named or described. In the mid-third millennium BC, some rulers regarded a particular god or gods as being their personal protector. In the second millennium BC, personal gods began to function more on behalf of the common person, with whom they had a close, personal relationship, maintained through prayer and maintenance of the god's statue. A number of written prayers have survived from ancient Mesopotamia, each of which typically exalt the god that they are describing above all others. The historian J. Bottéro stated that these poems display "extreme reverence, profound devotion, [and] the unarguable emotion that the supernatural evoked in the hearts of those ancient believers" but that they showed a people who were scared of their gods rather than openly celebrating them. They were thought to offer good luck, success, and protection from disease and demons, and one's place and success in society was thought to depend on their personal deity, including the development of their certain talents and even their personality. This was even taken to the point that everything the person experienced was considered a reflection of what was happening to their personal god. When a person neglected their god, it was assumed that the demons were free to inflict misery on them, and when they revered their god, that god was like a shepherd seeking food for them.

There was a strong belief in demons in Mesopotamia, and private individuals, like the temple priests, also participated in incantations (šiptu) to ward them off. Although there was no collective term for these beings either in Sumerian or Akkadian, they were merely described as harmful or dangerous beings or forces, and they were used as a logical way to explain the existence of evil in the world. They were thought to be countless in number, and were thought to even attack the gods as well. Besides demons, there were also spirits of the dead, (etimmu) who could also cause mischief. Amulets were occasionally used, and sometimes a special priest or exorcist (āšipu or mašmašu) was required. Incantations and ceremonies were also used to cure diseases which were also thought to be associated with demonic activity, sometimes making use of sympathetic magic. Sometimes an attempt was made to capture a demon by making an image of it, placing it above the head of a sick person, then destroying the image, which the demon was somehow likely to inhabit. Images of protecting spirits were also made and placed at gates to ward off disaster.

Divination was also employed by private individuals, with the assumption that the gods have already determined the destinies of people and these destinies could be ascertained through observing omens and through rituals (e.g., casting lots). It was believed that the gods expressed their will through "words" (amatu) and "commandments" (qibitu) which were not necessarily spoken, but were thought to manifest in the unfolding routine of events and things. There were countless ways to divine the future, such as observing oil dropped into a cup of water (lecanomancy), observing the entrails of sacrificial animals (extispicy), observation of the behavior of birds (augury) and observing celestial and meteorological phenomena (astrology), as well as through interpretation of dreams. Often interpretation of these phenomena required the need for two classes of priests: askers (sa'ilu) and observer (baru), and also sometimes a lower class of ecstatic seer (mahhu) that was also associated with witchcraft.

== Morality, virtue, and sin ==
"Do not return evil to the man who disputes with you, requite with kindness your evil-doer, maintain justice to your enemy... Let not your heart be induced to do evil... Give food to eat, beer to drink, the one begging for alms honor, clothe; in this a man's god takes pleasure, it is pleasing to Shamash, who will repay him with favour. Be helpful, do good"

— Incantation from the Šurpu series.

Although ancient paganism tended to focus more on duty and ritual than morality, a number of general moral virtues can be gleaned from surviving prayers and myths. It was believed that humanity originated as a divine act of creation, and the gods were believed to be the source of life, and held power over sickness and health, as well as the destinies of humans. Personal names show that each child was considered a gift from divinity. Humanity was believed to have been created to serve the gods, or perhaps wait on them: the god is lord (belu) and humanity is servant or slave (ardu), and was to fear (puluhtu) the gods and have the appropriate attitude towards them. Duties seem to have been primarily of a cultic and ritual nature, although some prayers express a positive psychological relationship, or a sort of conversion experience in regard to a god. Generally the reward to humankind is described as success and long life.

Every person also had duties to other people which had some religious character, particularly the king's duties to his subjects. It was thought that one of the reasons the gods gave power to the king was to exercise justice and righteousness, described as mēšaru and kettu, literally "straightness, rightness, firmness, truth". Examples of this include not alienating and causing dissension between friends and relatives, setting innocent prisoners free, being truthful, being honest in trade, respecting boundary lines and property rights, and not putting on airs with subordinates. Some of these guidelines are found in the second tablet of the Šurpu incantation series.

Sin, on the other hand, was expressed by the words hitu (mistake, false step), annu or arnu (rebellion), and qillatu (sin or curse), with strong emphasis on the idea of rebellion, sometimes with the idea that sin is a person’s wishing to "live on [their] own terms" (ina ramanisu). Sin also was described as anything which incited the wrath of the gods. Punishment came through sickness or misfortune, which inevitably lead to the common reference to unknown sins, or the idea that one can transgress a divine prohibition without knowing it—psalms of lamentation rarely mention concrete sins. This idea of retribution was also applied to the nation and history as a whole. A number of examples of Mesopotamian literature show how war and natural disasters were treated as punishment from the gods, and how kings were used as a tool for deliverance.

Sumerian myths suggest a prohibition against premarital sex. Marriages were often arranged by the parents of the bride and groom; engagements were usually completed through the approval of contracts recorded on clay tablets. These marriages became legal as soon as the groom delivered a bridal gift to his bride's father. Nonetheless, evidence suggests that premarital sex was a common, but surreptitious, occurrence. The worship of Inanna/Ishtar, which was prevalent in Mesopotamia could involve wild, frenzied dancing and bloody ritual celebrations of social and physical abnormality. It was believed that "nothing is prohibited to Inanna", and that by depicting transgressions of normal human social and physical limitations, including traditional gender definition, one could cross over from the "conscious everyday world into the trance world of spiritual ecstasy."

== Afterlife ==
Mesopotamians believed in an afterlife that took place in a region below the surface of the earth inhabited by living humans. This was the ancient Mesopotamian underworld, known by many names including Arallû, Ganzer or Irkallu ("Great Below"). It was believed everyone went to this region after death, irrespective of social status or the actions performed during their lifetime. Unlike Christian hell, the Mesopotamians considered the underworld neither a punishment nor a reward. Nevertheless, the condition of the dead was hardly considered the same as the life previously enjoyed on earth: they were considered merely weak and powerless ghosts. The myth of Ishtar's descent into the underworld relates that "dust is their food and clay their nourishment, they see no light, where they dwell in darkness." Stories such as the Adapa myth resignedly relate that, due to a blunder, all people must die and that true everlasting life is the sole property of the gods.

== Eschatology ==
There are no known Mesopotamian tales about the end of the world, although it has been speculated that they believed that this would eventually occur. This is largely because Berossus wrote that the Mesopotamians believed the world to last "twelve times twelve sars" in his Babyloniaca; with a sar being 3,600 years, this would indicate that at least some of the Mesopotamians believed that the Earth would only last 518,400 years. Berossus does not report what was thought to follow this event, however.

== Historiography ==
=== Reconstruction ===
As with most dead religions, many aspects of the common practices and intricacies of the doctrine have been lost and forgotten over time. However, much of the information and knowledge has survived, and great work has been done by historians and scientists, with the help of religious scholars and translators, to re-construct a working knowledge of the religious history, customs, and the role these beliefs played in everyday life in Sumer, Akkad, Assyria, Babylonia, Ebla and Chaldea during this time. Mesopotamian religion is thought to have been an influence on subsequent religions throughout the world, including Canaanite/Israelite, Aramean, and ancient Greek.

Mesopotamian religion was polytheistic, worshipping over 2,100 different deities, many of which were associated with a specific state within Mesopotamia, such as Sumer, Akkad, Assyria or Babylonia, or a specific Mesopotamian city.

Mesopotamian religion has historically the oldest body of recorded literature of any religious tradition. What is known about Mesopotamian religion comes from archaeological evidence uncovered in the region, particularly numerous literary sources, which are usually written in Sumerian, Akkadian (Assyro-Babylonian) or Aramaic using cuneiform script on clay tablets and which describe both mythology and cultic practices. Other artifacts can also be useful when reconstructing Mesopotamian religion. As is common with most ancient civilizations, the objects made of the most durable and precious materials, and thus more likely to survive, were associated with religious beliefs and practices. This has prompted one scholar to make the claim that the Mesopotamian's "entire existence was infused by their religiosity, just about everything they have passed on to us can be used as a source of knowledge about their religion."

=== Challenges ===
The modern study of Mesopotamia (Assyriology) is still a fairly young science, beginning only in the middle of the nineteenth century, and the study of Mesopotamian religion can be a complex and difficult subject because, by nature, their religion was governed only by usage, not by any official decision, and by nature it was neither dogmatic nor systematic. Deities, characters, and their actions within myths changed in character and importance over time, and occasionally depicted different, sometimes even contrasting images or concepts. This is further complicated by the fact that scholars are not entirely certain what role religious texts played in the Mesopotamian world.

A number of scholars once argued that defining a single Mesopotamian religion was not possible, and as such, a systematic exposition of Mesopotamian religion should not be produced. Other have rebutted that this is a mistaken approach, insofar as it would fracture the study of religion among social divisions (such as private religion, religion of the educated), individual cities and provinces (Ebla, Mari, Assyria), and time periods (Seleucid, Achaemenid, etc), and that this fracture would be counterproductive as the succession of ancient near eastern states did not impact the presence of a broadly shared religious system across them.

=== Panbabylonism ===
According to Panbabylonism, a school of thought founded by Hugo Winckler and held in the early 20th century among primarily German Assyriologists, there was a common cultural system extending over the ancient Near East which was overwhelmingly influenced by the Babylonians. According to this theory the religions of the Near East were rooted in Babylonian astral science- including the Hebrew Bible and Judaism. This theory of a Babylonian-derived Bible originated from the discovery of a stele in the acropolis of Susa bearing a Babylonian flood myth with many similarities to the flood of Genesis, the Epic of Gilgamesh. However, flood myths appear in almost every culture around the world, including cultures that never had contact with Mesopotamia. The fundamental tenets of Panbabylonism were eventually dismissed as pseudoscientific, however Assyriologists and biblical scholars recognize the influence of Babylonian mythology on Jewish mythology and other Near Eastern mythologies, albeit indirect. Indeed, similarities between both religious traditions may draw from even older sources.

=== Recent discoveries ===
In March 2020, archaeologists announced the discovery of a 5,000-year-old cultic area filled with more than 300 broken ceremonial ceramic cups, bowls, jars, animal bones and ritual processions dedicated to Ningirsu at the site of Girsu. One of the remains was a duck-shaped bronze figurine with eyes made from bark which is thought to be dedicated to Nanshe.

== Influence ==
=== General ===
While Mesopotamian religion had almost completely died out by approximately 400–500 AD after its indigenous adherents had largely become Syriac Christians, it has still had an influence on the modern world, predominantly because many biblical stories that are today found in Judaism, Christianity, Islam, and Mandaeism were possibly based upon earlier Mesopotamian myths, in particular that of the creation myth, the Garden of Eden, the flood myth, the Tower of Babel, figures such as Nimrod and Lilith and the Book of Esther. It has also inspired various contemporary neo-pagan groups.

=== Book of Revelation ===
In the New Testament Book of Revelation, Babylonian religion is associated with religious apostasy of the lowest order, the archetype of a political/religious system heavily tied to global commerce, and it is depicted as a system which, according to the author, continued to hold sway in the first century AD, eventually to be utterly annihilated (17:5; 18:9). According to some interpretations, this is believed to refer to the Roman Empire, but according to other interpretations, this system remains extant in the world until the Second Coming.

== See also ==
- Anunnaki
- Mesopotamian prayer
- Music of ancient Mesopotamia
- Religions of the ancient Near East
- Yazdânism
