= Necromancy =

Magic involving communication with the deceased

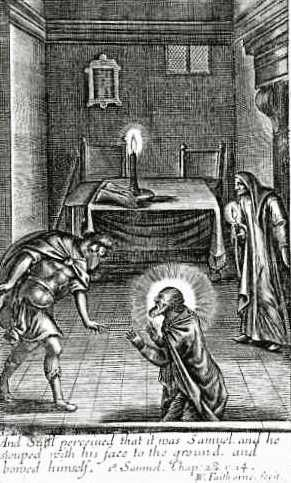
Illustration portraying a scene from the Bible wherein the Witch of Endor uses a necromantic ritual to conjure the spirit of Samuel at the behest of Saul; from the frontispiece of Sadducismus Triumphatus (1681) by Joseph Glanvill.

Necromancy (/ˈnɛkrəmænsi/) is the practice of magic involving communication with the dead by summoning their spirits as apparitions or visions for the purpose of divination; imparting the means to foretell future events and discover hidden knowledge. Sometimes categorized under death magic, the term is occasionally also used in a more general sense to refer to black magic or witchcraft as a whole.

== Etymology ==
The word necromancy is adapted from Late Latin necromantia: a loan word from the post-Classical Greek νεκρομαντεία (nekromanteía, or 'divination through a dead body'), a compound of Ancient Greek νεκρός (nekrós, or 'dead body') and μαντεία (manteía, or 'divination').

The Koine Greek compound form was first documented in the writings of Origen of Alexandria in the 3rd century AD. The Classical Greek term was ἡ νέκυια (nekyia), from the episode of the Odyssey in which Odysseus visits the realm of the dead souls, and νεκρομαντεία in Hellenistic Greek; necromantīa in Latin, and necromancy in 17th-century English.

== Antiquity ==
Early necromancy was related to – and most likely evolved from – forms of shamanism or prehistoric ritual magic that calls upon spirits such as the ghosts of deceased forebears. Classical necromancers addressed the dead in "a mixture of high-pitch squeaking and low droning", comparable to the trance-state mutterings of shamans. Necromancy was prevalent throughout antiquity with records of its practice in ancient Egypt, Babylonia, Greece, ancient Etruria, Rome, and China. In his Geographica, Strabo refers to νεκρομαντία (nekromantia), or "diviners by the dead", as the foremost practitioners of divination among the people of Persia, and it is believed to have also been widespread among the peoples of Chaldea (particularly the Hermeticists, or "star-worshipers") and Babylonia. The Babylonian necromancers were called manzazuu or sha'etemmu, and the spirits they raised were called etemmu. Traditional Chinese folk religion involves necromancy in seeking blessing from dead ancestors through ritual displays of filial piety.

The oldest literary account of necromancy is found in Homer's Odyssey. Under the direction of Circe, a powerful sorceress, Odysseus travels to the underworld (katabasis) in order to gain insight about his impending voyage home by raising the spirits of the dead through the use of spells which Circe has taught him. He wishes to invoke and question the shade of Tiresias in particular; however, he is unable to summon the seer's spirit without the assistance of others. The Odyssey's passages contain many descriptive references to necromantic rituals: rites must be performed around a pit with fire during nocturnal hours, and Odysseus has to follow a specific recipe, which includes the blood of sacrificial animals, to concoct a libation for the ghosts to drink while he recites prayers to both the ghosts and gods of the underworld.

Practices such as these, varying from the mundane to the grotesque, were commonly associated with necromancy. Rituals could be quite elaborate, involving magic circles, wands, talismans, and incantations. The necromancer might also surround himself with morbid aspects of death, which often included wearing the deceased's clothing and consuming foods that symbolized lifelessness and decay such as unleavened black bread and unfermented grape juice. Some necromancers even went so far as to take part in the mutilation and consumption of corpses. These ceremonies could carry on for hours, days, or even weeks, leading up to the eventual summoning of spirits. Frequently they were performed in places of interment or other melancholy venues that suited specific guidelines of the necromancer. Additionally, necromancers preferred to summon the recently departed based on the premise that their revelations were spoken more clearly. This timeframe was usually limited to the twelve months following the death of the physical body; once this period elapsed, necromancers would evoke the deceased's ghostly spirit instead.

While some cultures considered the knowledge of the dead to be unlimited, ancient Greeks and Romans believed that individual shades knew only certain things. The apparent value of their counsel may have been based on things they knew in life or knowledge they acquired after death. Ovid writes in his Metamorphoses of a marketplace in the underworld where the dead convene to exchange news and gossip.

=== Prohibited among Israelites ===
There are also several references to necromancers – called "bone-conjurers" among Jews of the later Hellenistic period – in the Bible. The Book of Deuteronomy (18:9–12) explicitly warns the Israelites against engaging in the Canaanite practice of divination from the dead:

^{9}When thou art come into the land which the LORD thy God giveth thee, thou shalt not learn to do according to the abominations of those nations. ^{10}There shall not be found among you any one who maketh his son or his daughter to pass through the fire, or who useth divination, or an observer of times, or an enchanter, or a witch, ^{11}or a charmer, or a consulter with familiar spirits, or a wizard, or a necromancer. ^{12}For all who do these things are an abomination unto the LORD, and because of these abominations the LORD thy God doth drive them out from before thee (KJV).

Though Mosaic Law prescribed the death penalty to practitioners of necromancy (Leviticus 20:27), this warning was not always heeded. One of the foremost examples is when King Saul had the Witch of Endor invoke the spirit of Samuel, a judge and prophet, from Sheol to divine the outcome of a coming battle (1 Samuel 28:3–25). However, the so-called witch was shocked at the presence of a familiar spirit in the image of Samuel for in I Sam 28:7 states "Behold, there is a woman that hath a familiar spirit at Endor" and in I Sam 28:12 says, "when the woman saw Samuel, she cried out in a loud voice", and the familiar spirit questioned his reawakening, asking as if he were Samuel the Prophet, "Why hast thou disquieted me?" Saul died the next day in combat, with Chronicles 10:13 implying this was due to the prohibition against necromancy.

== Early and High Middle Age ==
Many medieval writers believed that actual resurrection required the assistance of God. They saw the practice of necromancy as conjuring demons who took the appearance of spirits. The practice became known explicitly as maleficium, and the Catholic Church condemned it. Though the practitioners of necromancy were linked by many common threads, there is no evidence that these necromancers ever organized as a group. One noted commonality among practitioners of necromancy was usually the utilization of certain toxic and hallucinogenic plants from the nightshade family such as black henbane, jimson weed, belladonna or mandrake, usually in magic salves or potions.

Medieval necromancy is believed to be a synthesis of astral magic derived from Arabic influences and exorcism derived from Christian and Jewish teachings. Arabic influences are evident in rituals that involve moon phases, sun placement, day and time. Fumigation and the act of burying images are also found in both astral magic and necromancy. Christian and Jewish influences appear in the symbols and in the conjuration formulas used in summoning rituals.

Practitioners were often members of the Christian clergy, though some nonclerical practitioners are recorded. In some instances, mere apprentices or those ordained to lower orders dabbled in the practice. They were connected by a belief in the manipulation of spiritual beings – especially demons – and magical practices. These practitioners were almost always literate and well educated. Most possessed basic knowledge of exorcism and had access to texts of astrology and of demonology. Clerical training was informal and university-based education rare. Most were trained under apprenticeships and were expected to have a basic knowledge of Latin, ritual and doctrine. This education was not always linked to spiritual guidance and seminaries were almost non-existent. This situation allowed some aspiring clerics to combine Christian rites with occult practices despite its condemnation in Christian doctrine.

Medieval practitioners believed they could accomplish three things with necromancy: will manipulation, illusions, and knowledge:

- Will manipulation affects the mind and will of another person, animal, or spirit. Demons are summoned to cause various afflictions on others, "to drive them mad, to inflame them to love or hatred, to gain their favor, or to constrain them to do or not do some deed."
- Illusions involve reanimation of the dead or conjuring food, entertainment, or a mode of transportation.
- Knowledge is allegedly discovered when demons provide information about various things. This might involve identifying criminals, finding items, or revealing future events.

The act of performing medieval necromancy usually involved magic circles, conjurations, and sacrifices such as those shown in the Munich Manual of Demonic Magic:

- Circles were usually traced on the ground, though cloth and parchment were sometimes used. Various objects, shapes, symbols, and letters may be drawn or placed within that represent a mixture of Christian and occult ideas. Circles were usually believed to empower and protect what was contained within, including protecting the necromancer from the conjured demons. A text known as the Heptameron explain the function of the circle thusly: "But because the greatest power is attributed to the Circles; (For they are certain fortresses to defend the operators safe from the evil Spirits;)..."
- Conjuration is the method of communicating with the demons to have them enter the physical world. It usually employs the power of special words and stances to call out the demons and often incorporated the use of Christian prayers or biblical verses. These conjurations may be repeated in succession or repeated to different directions until the summoning is complete.
- Sacrifice was the payment for summoning; though it may involve the flesh of a human being or animal, it could sometimes be as simple as offering a certain object. Instructions for obtaining these items were usually specific. The time, location, and method of gathering items for sacrifice could also play an important role in the ritual.

The rare confessions of those accused of necromancy suggest that there was a range of spell casting and related magical experimentation. It is difficult to determine if these details were due to their practices, as opposed to the whims of their interrogators. John of Salisbury is one of the first examples related by Richard Kieckhefer, but as a Parisian ecclesiastical court record of 1323 shows, a "group who were plotting to invoke the demon Berich from inside a circle made from strips of cat skin" were obviously participating in what the Church would define as "necromancy".

Herbert Stanley Redgrove claims necromancy as one of three chief branches of medieval ceremonial magic, alongside black magic and white magic. This does not correspond to contemporary classifications, which often conflate "nigromancy" ("black-knowledge") with "necromancy" ("death-knowledge").

== Late Middle Ages to Renaissance ==
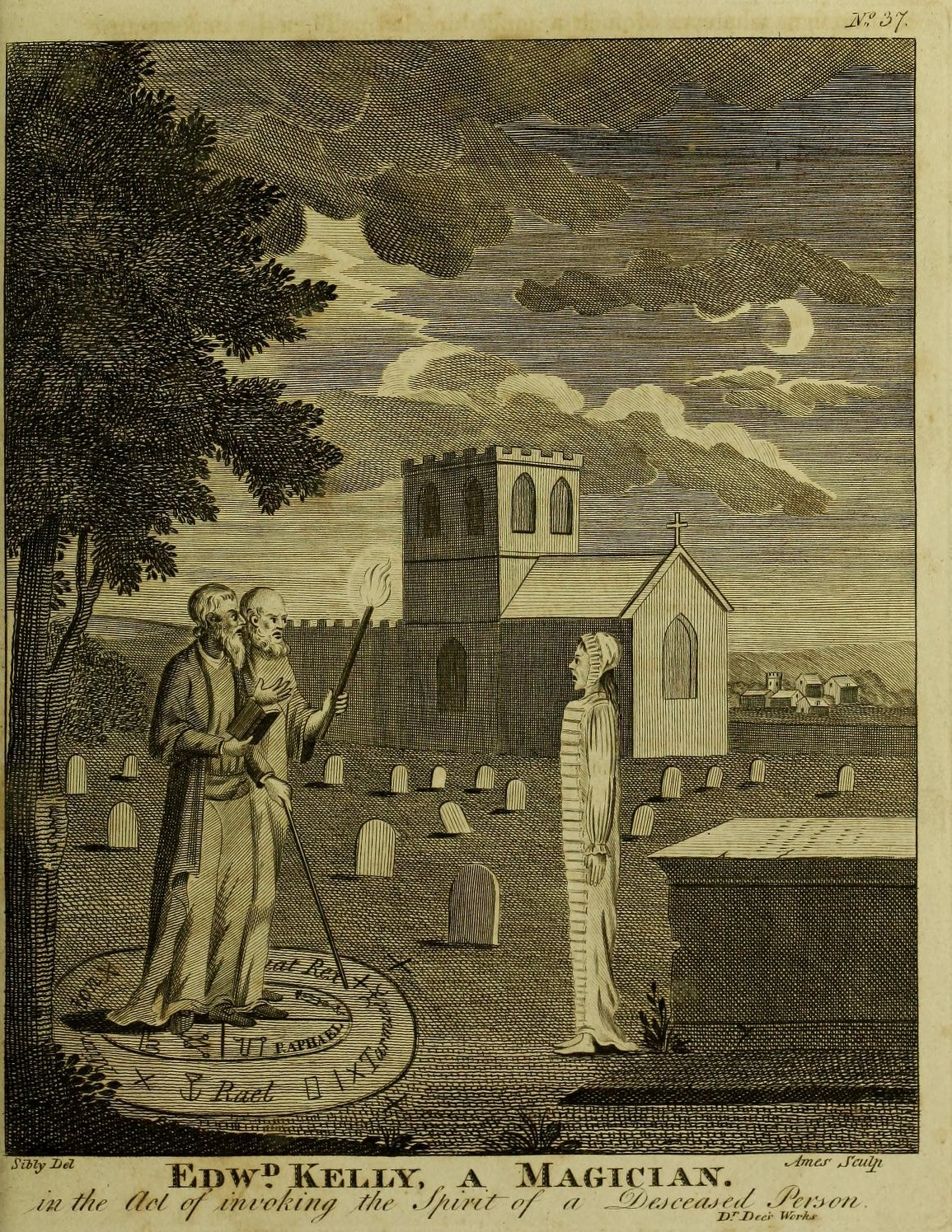
Engraving of occultists Paul Waring and Edward Kelley "in the act of invoking the spirit of a deceased person"; from Astrology (1806) by Ebenezer Sibly.

In the wake of inconsistencies of judgment, necromancers and other practitioners of the magic arts were able to utilize spells featuring holy names with impunity, as any biblical references in such rituals could be construed as prayers rather than spells. As a consequence, the necromancy that appears in the Munich Manual of Demonic Magic is an evolution of these theoretical understandings. It has been suggested that the authors of the Manual knowingly designed the book to be in discord with ecclesiastical law. The main recipe employed throughout the Manual used the same religious language and names of power alongside demonic names. An understanding of the names of God derived from apocryphal texts and the Hebrew Torah required that the author of such rites have at least a casual familiarity with these sources.

Within the tales related in occult manuals are found connections with stories from other cultures' literary traditions. For instance, the ceremony for conjuring a horse closely relates to the Arabic One Thousand and One Nights and French romances; Chaucer's The Squire's Tale also bears marked similarities. This becomes a parallel evolution of spells to foreign gods or demons that were once acceptable, and frames them into a new Christian context, albeit demonic and forbidden. As the material for these manuals was apparently derived from scholarly magical and religious texts from a variety of sources in many languages, the scholars who studied these texts likely manufactured their own aggregate sourcebook and manual with which to work spells or magic.

In the notebooks of Leonardo da Vinci, it is stated that "Of all human opinions that is to be reputed the most foolish which deals with the belief in Necromancy, the sister of Alchemy, which gives birth to simple and natural things."

== Modern era ==
In the present day, necromancy is more generally used as a term to describe manipulation of death and the dead, or the pretense thereof, often facilitated through the use of ritual magic or some other kind of occult ceremony. Contemporary séances, channeling and Spiritualism verge on necromancy when supposedly invoked spirits are asked to reveal future events or secret information. Necromancy may also be presented as sciomancy, a branch of theurgic magic.

As to the practice of necromancy having endured in one form or another throughout the millennia, An Encyclopædia of Occultism states:

The art is of almost universal usage. Considerable difference of opinion exists among modern adepts as to the exact methods to be properly pursued in the necromantic art, and it must be borne in mind that necromancy, which in the Middle Ages was called sorcery, shades into modern spiritualistic practice. There is no doubt, however, that necromancy is the touch-stone of occultism, for if, after careful preparation the adept can carry through to a successful issue, the raising of the soul from the other world, he has proved the value of his art.

== Contemporary pop-culture ==
The archvillain in J.R.R. Tolkien's Lord of the Rings fantasy, Sauron, first reappears in the environs of Middle Earth as 'the Necromancer of Dol Guldur' in The Hobbit, Tolkien's standalone prologue to the Lord of the Rings trilogy. In fictional settings such as Dungeons & Dragons or fantasy video games, necromancy is associated with the reanimation of corpses often meant to be used as weapons. This tradition appears to combine associations of conjuring the dead from European and Mediterranean traditions with elements involving Zombies that seem to derive from Caribbean folklore and practice.

Necromancy is a form of magic in the Skulduggery Pleasant series, by Irish author Derek Landy. This form of magic is mostly concerned with the manipulation of shadow, darkness and life energy. In the series the most famous Necromancer is Lord Vile. The protagonist Valkyrie Cain deals with the allure of this form of magic and its consequences for much of her adult life.

In the Diablo video games, there is a necromancer character class.

Swedish Extreme Metal band Bathory (band) released a Song called Necromancy, (Wrongly spelled Necromansy on the original release) on their 1984 album Bathory (album).

== See also ==
- Gastromancy – Performing voices through a puppet to seem independent of the speaker
- Grógaldr – Old Norse poem
- Haitian Vodou – Religion from Haiti
- List of occult terms
- Macumba – Generic term for various Afro-Brazilian religions
- Necromanteion of Acheron – Ancient Greek temple of necromancy
- Ouija – Flat board for communicating with spirits
- Spirit possession – Purported control of a human body by spirits, ghosts, demons
- Witchcraft and divination in the Hebrew Bible
- Yūrei – Figures in Japanese folklore similar to ghosts
- Islam and magic – Divination, magic, and occultism in Islam
- Lich – Undead creature from fantasy literature

== Sources ==
- Cook, D. (1989). Breault, M (ed.). Player's Handbook. Advanced Dungeons & Dragons, 2nd Edition. Lake Geneva, WI: TSR. ISBN 978-0-88038-716-3.
- Guiley, R. E. (2006). "Necromancy". The Encyclopedia of Magic and Alchemy. New York: Infobase Publishing. pp. 215–216. ISBN 978-0-8160-6048-1.
- Homer (1900) [c. 700 BCE]. The Odyssey. S. Butler, trans. London: Longmans, Green & Co. OCLC 4862683.
- Johnson, M. M. (2004). "Necromancy". In Golden, R. M (ed.). Encyclopedia of Witchcraft: The Western Tradition. Santa Barbara, CA: ABC-CLIO. pp. 808–809. ISBN 978-1-57607-243-1.
- Kieckhefer, R. (1998). Forbidden Rites: A Necromancer's Manual of the Fifteenth Century. University Park, PA: Penn State University Press. ISBN 978-0-271-01751-8.
- Kieckhefer, R. (2011). "Chapter 7: Necromancy in the Clerical Underworld". Magic in the Middle Ages (2nd ed.). Cambridge, UK: Cambridge University Press. pp. 151–175. ISBN 978-0-521-78576-1.
- Kors, A. C. & Peters, E., eds. (2001). Witchcraft in Europe 400–1700: A Documentary History (2nd ed.). Philadelphia: University of Pennsylvania Press. ISBN 978-0-8122-1751-3.
- Kurtz, S. (1995). Forbeck, M (ed.). The Complete Book of Necromancers. Advanced Dungeons & Dragons, 2nd Edition. Lake Geneva, WI: TSR. ISBN 978-0-7869-0106-7.
- Láng, B. (2010). Unlocked Books: Manuscripts of Learned Magic in the Medieval Libraries of Central Europe (New ed.). University Park: Penn State University Press. ISBN 978-0-271-03378-5.
- Leonardo da Vinci (1970) [1452–1519]. Richter, J. P (ed.). The Notebooks of Leonardo da Vinci. New York: Dover Publications. ISBN 978-0-486-22573-9.
- Lewis, J. R. (1999). Witchcraft Today: An Encyclopedia of Wiccan and Neopagan Traditions. Santa Barbara, CA: ABC-CLIO. ISBN 978-1-57607-134-2.
- Luck, G. (2006). Arcana Mundi: Magic and the Occult in the Greek and Roman Worlds—A Collection of Ancient Texts (2nd ed.). Baltimore, MD: Johns Hopkins University Press. ISBN 978-0-8018-8345-3.
- Ovid (1717) [8 CE]. Garth, S (ed.). Metamorphoses. J. Addison, W. Congreve, S. Croxall, J. Dryden, L. Eusden, J. Gay, A. Maynwaring & N. Tate, trans. London: Jacob Tonson. OCLC 85877585.
- Redgrove, H. S. (1920). "Chapter 7: Ceremonial Magic in Theory and Practice". Bygone Beliefs: Being a Series of Excursions in the Byways of Thought. London: W. Rider & Son. pp. 87–110. OCLC 2784604.
- Ruickbie, L. (2004). Witchcraft Out of the Shadows: A Complete History. London: Robert Hale. ISBN 978-0-7090-7567-7.
- Siembieda, K.; Long, K. & Rosenstein, J. (1993). Rifts World Book Four: Africa. Taylor, MI: Palladium Books. ISBN 978-0-916211-58-5.
- Siembieda, K.; Sumimoto, M. & Cartier, R. (1998). Rifts World Book 18: Mystic Russia. Taylor, MI: Palladium Books. ISBN 978-1-57457-011-3.
- Siembieda, K.; Wujcik, E.; Cartier, R.; Marciniszyn, A.; Jacques, C. & McCall, R. (1996). Palladium Fantasy Role-Playing Game Book III: Adventures on the High Seas (2nd ed.). Taylor, MI: Palladium Books. ISBN 978-0-916211-17-2.
- Spence, L. (1920). "Necromancy". An Encyclopædia of Occultism. London: Routledge. pp. 286–290. OCLC 264589119.
- Strabo (1889–1893) [20 BCE – 23 CE]. Hamilton, H. C.; Falconer, W (eds.). Geography. London: George Bell & Sons. OCLC 693763975.
- Tweet, J.; Cook, M. & Williams, S. (2003). Martin, J. & Rateliff, J (eds.). Player's Handbook: Core Rulebook I. Dungeons & Dragons v3.5. Renton, WA: Wizards of the Coast. ISBN 978-0-7869-2886-6.
