= List of channelers =

Here is a list of people who claim to be mediums or channelers in communication with beings and spirits of the deceased, through the study and practice of mediumship. Mediumship is the practice of those people known as mediums that allegedly mediate communication between spirits of the dead and living human beings.

== A ==
- Derek Acorah
- Rosemary Altea

== B ==
- Clifford Bias
- Helena Blavatsky
- Emma Hardinge Britten
- Sylvia Browne

== C ==
- Theresa Caputo
- Lee Carroll
- Edgar Cayce
- George Chapman
- Benjamin Creme
- Chip Coffey
- Florence Cook
- Aleister Crowley

== D ==
- Andrew Jackson Davis
- Jeane Dixon
- Allison DuBois

== E ==
- John Edward

== F ==
- Arthur Ford
- Colin Fry
- Divaldo Pereira Franco
- Fox sisters
- Matt Fraser (psychic)

== G ==
- Eileen J. Garrett

== H ==
- Victor Hennequin
- Tyler Henry
- Esther Hicks

== J ==
- Linda and Terry Jamison
- Thomas John

== K ==
- M. Lamar Keene
- J. Z. Knight

== L ==
- Dada Lekhraj

== M ==
- Char Margolis
- Ruth Montgomery
- Sally Morgan

== P ==
- Eusapia Palladino
- Leonora Piper
- James Van Praagh

== R ==
- Paschal Beverly Randolph
- Jane Roberts

== S ==
- Helen Schucman
- Tony Stockwell
- Doris Stokes

== T ==
- Stanisława Tomczyk

== W ==
- Neale Donald Walsch
- Lorraine Warren
- Lisa Williams
- Jeanette Wilson

== X ==
- Chico Xavier

== See also ==
- List of occult terms
