= Obeah and wanga =

Occult terminology used in Thelema

The terms obeah and wanga are African diasporic words that occur in The Book of the Law (the sacred text of Thelema, written by English author and occultist Aleister Crowley in 1904):

Also the mantras and spells; the obeah and the wanga; the work of the wand and the work of the sword; these he shall learn and teach. (AL I:37).

Obeah is a folk magic found among those of African descent in the West Indies. It is derived from the Asante people of west Africa. Its English translation is witchcraft, from the Twi dialect word 'obeyi'.

A wanga (sometimes spelled ouanga or wanger) is a magical charm packet found in the folk magic practices of Haiti, and as such it is connected to the west African religion of Vodun, which in turn derives from the Fon people of what is now Benin.

== Etymology and meaning ==
Hesketh Bell notes that obeah is likely derived from the Asante Twi word Ɔbayi, used on the west coast of Africa mean witchcraft, itself derived from the Egyptian word 'ob', meaning 'serpent'. He mentions wanga in the same context, though he does not define it or provide an etymology. Richard Allsopp mentions that Bell equates wanga with obeah, and further notes that it is more commonly spelled ouanga in Haiti. Gordon Rohlehr notes that the word wanga refers to the "obeahman's power to cast spells and the much-feared sexuality of the old woman which could 'blight' a young man."

== In Thelema ==
In his Commentaries, Crowley explains:

The obeah is the magick of the Secret Light with special reference to acts; the wanga is the verbal or mental correspondence of the same. [...] The "obeah" being the acts, and the "wanga" the words, proper to Magick, the two cover the whole world of external expression.

He goes on to say:

Magick is the management of all we say and do, so that the effect is to change that part of our environment which dissatisfies us, until it does so no longer. We "remould it nearer to the heart's desire."

Magick ceremonies proper are merely organized and concentrated attempts to impose our Will on certain parts of the Cosmos. They are only particular cases of the general law.

But all we say and do, however casually, adds up to more, far more, than our most strenuous Operations. "Take care of the pence, and the pounds will take care of themselves." Your daily drippings fill a bigger bucket than your geysers of magical effort. [...]

== See also ==
- List of magical terms and traditions
- Sex magic
