= Saturn return =

Return of Saturn to birth chart position

In horoscopic astrology, a Saturn return is an astrological transit that occurs when the planet Saturn returns to the same position that it occupied at the moment of a person's birth. While Saturnian return is most often discussed in terms of the first return, which occurs in one's late 20s, Saturn returns again in one's 50s and 80s. While the planet takes 29 years to reach the same ecliptic longitude, the influence of the Saturn return is in effect for a few years; Saturn's first return is seen as influential from ages 27 to 30.

Psychologically, Saturn return is associated with self-discovery and reevaluating one's priorities. The first Saturn return is seen as the time of reaching full adulthood, and being faced, perhaps for the first time, with adult challenges and responsibilities.

== In Western astrology ==
The phenomenon is described by Western astrologers as occurring at roughly 29.5 year intervals, as Saturn completes its revolution around the sun. As Saturn orbits the sun, it passes through each astrological sign for about 3 years. Western astrologers believe that, as Saturn "returns" to the degree in its orbit occupied at the time of birth, a person crosses over a major threshold and enters the next stage of life. With the first Saturn return, a person leaves youth behind and enters adulthood. With the second return, maturity. And with the third and usually final return, a person enters wise old age. These periods are estimated to occur at roughly the ages of 27–31, 56–60 and 84–90. A fourth return—for those who live to see the age of 114–118—is sufficiently rare that it is not given coverage in the astrological literature.

== In popular culture ==
No Doubt's 2000 album Return of Saturn explicitly referenced this astrological concept. Additionally, in the early- to mid-2020s, a number of high-profile female musicians made references to their Saturn return, bringing increased interest in the phenomenon.

== See also ==
- 27 Club
- Midlife crisis
- Quarter-life crisis
- Chūnibyō, stereotyped to occur during the Saturn opposition
