= Munich Manual of Demonic Magic =

Fifteenth century grimoire on necromancy and demonology

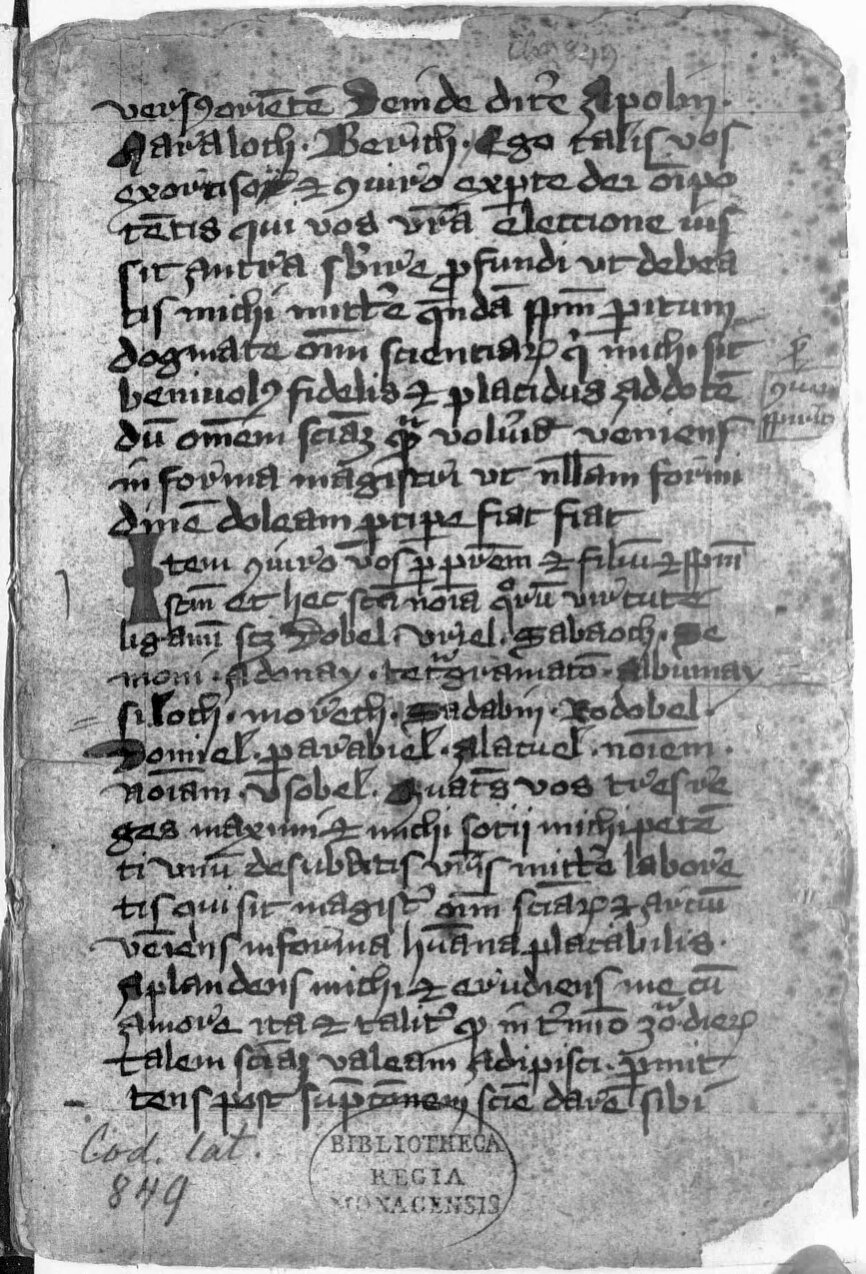
- First page of the Munich Manual
- Author: Anonymous
- Original title: Liber incantationum, exorcismorum et fascinationum variarum
- Language: Latin
- Subject: Magic, Demonology, Necromancy
- Published: 15th century

The Munich Manual of Demonic Magic or Liber incantationum, exorcismorum et fascinationum variarum (CLM 849 of the Bavarian State Library, Munich) is a fifteenth-century goetic grimoire manuscript. The text, composed in Latin, is largely concerned with demonology and necromancy.

Richard Kieckhefer edited the original Latin-text manuscript under the title Forbidden Rites: A Necromancer's Manual of the Fifteenth Century, which was published including a commentary in 1998. The author's essays and explanations—regarding the Munich Manual and grimoires in general—include English translations of portions of the text. A Russian translation of the grimoire's original Latin was published in 2019. The first comprehensive English translation was published in 2023.

== Content ==
There is only one known surviving manuscript of the Munich Manual. It is almost complete, except that it lacks the first two folios, which describe the beginning of the first ritual. The rest of the grimoire contains instructions for the invocation and control of mythical beings such as Satan, Lilith, Astaroth, Valac and Samael. Some of the spells claim to empower the caster to win the love of a woman, to become invisible, to acquire valuables and wealth, or to gain knowledge. More than forty illustrations of magic circles and symbols, to be used in the rituals described, accompany the text.

Pages 130 to 133 include a list of eleven demons, similar in part to the one from Ars Goetia.

1. Count / Duke Barbarus
2. Duke Cason
3. President / Count Otius
4. King Curson
5. Duke Alugor
6. Prince Taob
7. President Volach
8. Duke Gaeneron
9. Marquis Tuveries
10. President Hanni
11. Marquis Sucax

The manuscript seems to be a compilation of material from multiple earlier sources. Most of its text is in Latin, with the exception of two appendices of material written in German and in Italian.

One of the sections of the Munich Manual contains the Bond of Solomon, a magic ritual by which demons may supposedly be bound for the purpose of acting as guardians, supplying treasure, or answering questions on any matter. Another chapter includes instructions to create a magic mirror known as the Mirror of Floron, that would allow the practitioner to summon the demon Floron for divination purposes.

== Bibliography ==
- Kieckhefer, Richard (1998). Forbidden Rites: A Necromancer's Manual of the Fifteenth Century. Penn State Press. ISBN 0-271-01751-1.
