= Ya sang =

Black magic in Thailand

Ya Sang or Yaa Sang (Thai: ยาสั่ง) is a form of black magic said to be performed in Thailand's northeast, Isan. It is based on traditional knowledge of plant poisons, some causing stomach ailments, physical pain, and intoxication, leading to death.
