= Apantomancy =

Form of divination

Apantomancy is a form of divination using articles at hand or things that present themselves by chance. The diviner works him/herself into a state of trance until an object or event is perceived and a divination worked out. This form of divination was used in ancient Rome by the augurs. There is no set of standard interpretations in apantomancy, with the interpretations of events depending on the background of the seer.

A branch of apantomancy places special significance on chance meetings of animals. The superstition regarding black cats crossing your path comes from this form of divination. Other common superstitions based on apantomancy are the belief that seeing a buzzard is an omen of death.
