= Anachitis =

Stone used in divination

In divination, an anachitis, or anancitis, meaning "stone of necessity" is a stone used to call up spirits from water. It was described as a type of diamond by Martin Ruland the Elder.

The stone was used in classical antiquity by the Magi, being described by Pliny the Elder as one of their "dreadful lies". Its use had fallen out of favour by the Middle Ages.
