= Astrological progression =

Using horoscopes to predict the future

Astrological progressions are one of the main means used in Horoscopic astrology to forecast future trends and developments (the other means is transits, which are simply the ongoing movements of the planets across the sky). As its name implies, astrological progression involves a method of progressing the Horoscope forward from the moment of the birth or beginning of the subject into the future, and is most usually done for the birth or natal chart of a particular individual.

There are two main forms of progression: Secondary progression or 'a-day-for-a-year' progression; and Solar arc direction or 'a-degree-for-a-year' progression. In both systems, the planets, Ascendant, and Midheaven are all seen to have changed position in the progressed chart, and these changes are noted. Particular attention is paid to changes of zodiac signs and houses, and to the angles or aspects the progressed planets form with the original natal chart.

== Predictive astrology ==
Astrological progression is a part of what is usually called predictive astrology, the claim of astrology to predict or forecast future trends and developments. Most astrologers nowadays regard the term 'prediction' as something of a misnomer, as modern astrology does not claim to directly predict future events as such. Instead it is claimed that an astrological pattern with regard to the future can correspond with any one of a variety of possibilities. What is in fact foretold is the trend of circumstances and the nature of the individual's reaction to the situation In other words, progressed and transiting movements of the planets indicate phases in the individual's life when the potential shown in the natal chart will be given opportunities for development, whether through favourable or unfavourable circumstances

In addition all modern astrologers stress the role of free will. It is asserted that astrology does not reveal fate or patterns which are 'written in stone', rather it reveals a person's strengths and weakness, talents and opportunities. The horoscope does not determine the future, but shows the possible paths that lie ahead so that the individual can choose between them. Modern astrologers argue that no planetary aspect brings a fate that cannot be counteracted in some way and some benefit derived from it - what actual events happen are largely dependent upon the freedom of choice of the individual. The role of the astrologer is to create self-knowledge and awareness of the movement of the planets and their meaning, so as to give the individual an improved ability to make reasoned and sensible life choices. In short, modern astrologers do not generally predict actual future events, or claim that the future is mapped out and determined.

== Secondary progressions ==
Also called a-day-for-a-year progression, Major progression and Secondary direction. This progression involves moving the natal chart forward one day for each year of a person's life. So, for example, a person born on April 2, 1982, would have a progressed chart for 2007 drawn up based on the position of the planets on April 27, 1982 (i.e. 25 days for 25 years). The patterns formed 25 days after the person's birth are considered to be symbolic of the person's 25th year of life, and indicate potential tendencies and trends for the year. Secondary progressions are considered by the majority of astrologers to be the most important form of progression.

== Solar arc progressions ==
Also called a-degree-for-a-year progression, and Solar arc direction. This form of progression involves the whole natal chart being moved forward one degree for each year. So, for 2007, a person born on April 2, 1982, would have a progressed chart drawn up based on the position of the planets moved forward 25 degrees from their position on that birth date (this creates a chart of planetary positions that never existed in real life). The name 'solar arc progression' derives from the fact that the sun moves about one degree a day, so the rest of the planets in this method are in a sense 'made to follow' the sun. In other words, the planets are made to move the same distance as was travelled by the sun in secondary progression. Those astrologers who use solar arc progression usually regard it as an additional source of information, to be used in combination with secondary progression.

== Other progression methods ==
A variety of other methods of progression have also been used. They include the following:

- Tertiary progression (TP) - one day after birth equals one lunar month of life.
- Quaternary (Minor) progression (QP) - one lunar month after birth equals one year of life.
- Converse progression (CP) - one day before birth equals one year of life (converse secondary progression/CSP), one day before birth equals one lunar month of life (converse tertiary progression/CTP), and one lunar month before birth equals one year of life (converse quaternary progression/CQP) (and so on backwards in time).
- Symbolic arc progression - planets are moved an arbitrary amount according to some other rate established, e.g. one day in the ephemeris equals 12 year (Jupiter progression), or one month in the ephemeris equals 30 years (Saturn progression).

== Interpretation ==
Interpretation of progressions is usually fairly similar to the interpretation of transits. In general, however, progressions primarily involve psychological developments from within the individual (often of course stimulated by exterior events) while transits involve developments in the life circumstances outside the individual's control.

The most important point to remember with progressions is that the pattern of the natal chart always determines their value. So, for example, if the sun and Mars are in a difficult aspect in the natal chart, a positive or easy aspect between progressed Mars and the natal sun will not produce the same expected benefit. Also, if planets are not aspected in the natal chart, progressed aspects will in general not have the same effect. In short, each person carries the pattern of the natal chart with them all their lives, and the progressed and transiting movements of the planets indicate when the potential in the natal chart will be given opportunities for development.

Progressions are usually only important for the inner personal planets (Sun, Moon, Mercury, Venus, and Mars) as the progressed outer planets will have moved only an insignificant distance. However, the personal planets do make aspects to the transpersonal and outer planets. Significant events in the motion of a slow moving body, such as a station retrograde or direct by progression, are also considered significant by many astrologers who use progressions.

== Progressed planets' aspects ==
The main significance of progressed planets is when they form aspects with planets in the natal chart. Progressed aspects are usually limited to an orb of one degree either side of the natal planet. The following is a brief description of the effect of progressed aspects:

- Progressed Sun: A period of major importance. Psychologically, and through correlative circumstances, the time will be ripe for important adjustments, organising and integrating of the whole life pattern, as directed by the planet involved in aspect with the sun.
- Progressed Moon: A period of about one month's duration, in which affairs and psychological features associated with the planet will be emphasised and activated. The progressed moon often acts as a 'trigger' to activate patterns already set by other progressed planets.
- Progressed Mercury: Usually indicates changes and necessary readjustments, increased mental activity, travel, and literary matters of above average importance.
- Progressed Venus: Period of much importance as regards emotional, personal and creative interests. Can mean marriage, falling in love - or out of love, inspired creative work, birth of a child, or an emphasis on money matters.
- Progressed Mars: Period of increased activity, conflict, enterprise. Energy must be controlled, and impulsive action avoided. Subject is more accident prone. Can be an ideal time for taking the initiative, or tackling work that has piled up.

== Progressed Angles ==
Unless the time of birth is very accurately known, progressing the ascendant and midheaven can be disregarded. Aspects formed by the progressed ascendant suggest significant developments in self-centred interests, personal ambitions and health. Progressed midheaven suggests developments in career and business interests.

== Retrograde motion ==
The retrograde motion of a planet is its apparent backward motion through the sky caused by the earth travelling past a slower moving outer planet, or when the earth is itself passed by a faster moving inner planet. For secondary progression or the day-for-a-year method, retrograde motion means that progressing a planet forward one day in time leads to the planet's moving 'backwards' in the chart in an anti-clockwise fashion. In astrology this backward movement was traditionally thought to be unlucky or inauspicious, as it went against the 'natural' order of movement (or 'direct movement' as it is known), and a planet which was retrograde at the time of birth was considered a weak spot in the natal chart.

Most modern astrologers do consider the retrograde movement of a planet to be indicative of stress or difficulty, although this is usually mentioned only with regard to transiting planets. For example, the retrograde movement of Mercury is commonly thought to signify difficulties in communication, such as post or emails going astray, verbal misunderstandings, and travel delays and frustrations. Some astrologers however, do not regard the change from direct to retrograde motion as automatically being one to repression and limitation (nor the reverse sudden release). Rather a change in either direction of movement is regarded by them as simply indicating a shift in a person's handling of that part of their life . In fact, many astrologers do not consider retrograde movement to be of any particular significance, especially given that the outer planets are retrograde for over 40% of the time. The full implications, if any, of retrograde motion in progressed planets appears to remain relatively little understood.
