= Acultomancy =

Form of Divination

Acultomancy (from acutomancy, the type of acultomancy described below, influenced by Latin acūleus, needle) is a form of divination that uses needles for readings.

Using needles comes from the olden days where Romani people used to read people and use needles as their pointers. Readers use seven needles or up to twenty one needles in a somewhat shallow bowl with water in it. Needles may also be dropped onto a flat surface that has been coated with powder or flour. Readers then look for the designs that the needles make in the substance.

== See also ==
- Aichmomancy
- Methods of divination
