= Anthropomancy =

Method of divination

Anthropomancy (from Greek anthropos (ἄνθρωπος, man) and manteia (μαντεία, divination)) is a method of divination by the entrails of dead or dying men or women through sacrifice. This practice was sometimes also called splanchnomancy. In ancient Etruria and Rome, the usual variety of divination from entrails was haruspicy (performed by a haruspex), in which the sacrifice was an animal.

== Practitioners in fiction ==
- "Clyde Bruckman's Final Repose", an episode of The X-Files
- Nasus, the Curator of the Sands, League of Legends
- Darken Rahl
- Creatures of Light and Darkness
- Ninth House
- Voice Like a Hyacinth
