= Aichmomancy =

Form of divination

Aichmomancy (from Greek aikhmē, spearhead and manteia, prophecy) is a form of divination somewhat similar to acultomancy in that it uses sharp pointed objects to show patterns to read.

Aichmomancy readers use pins, knives, forks, nails, and handmade pieces of wood sharpened to a point. Readers drop sharp pointed objects onto a flat surface, find patterns and interpret them.

In the most ancient form of this divination a spearhead was spun in the sand. Several centuries later, during the Early Middle Ages, divinations with pins became popular in Europe. Readers used seven pins and a table covered with cloth. Pins were thrown over the table, and the patterns were read and interpreted.

The basic patterns and their interpretations:

1 – Love	5 – Danger	9 – Honesty	13 – Sickness	17 – Pleasure	21 – Break-up
2 – Money	6 – Quarrel	10 – Rudeness	14 – Wedding	18 – Encounter	22 – Health
3 – Gift	7 – Prison	11 – Joy	15 – Birth	19 – Meeting	23 – Vanity
4 – Grief	8 – Engagement	12 – Letter	16 – Resistance	20 – Success	24 - Road

== See also ==
- Divination
- Methods of divination
