= Astrological transit =

Movement of the planets through a sign

Astrological transits are one of the main means used in horoscopic astrology to forecast future trends and developments (the other means used is astrological progression, which progresses the horoscope forward in time according to set methods). As its name implies, astrological transits involve a method of interpreting the ongoing movement of the planets as they transit the horoscope. This is most often done for the birth or Natal Chart of a particular individual. Particular attention is paid to changes of sign, or house, and to the aspects or angles the transiting planets make with the natal chart.

A particularly important transit is the planetary return. This occurs when a transiting planet returns to the same point in the sky that it occupied at the moment of a person's birth. What this means is that the planet has completed a whole circuit of the sky, and signifies that a new cycle in the person's life is beginning. The most significant returns are those of the outer planets Jupiter and Saturn. The Jupiter return occurs approximately every 12 years and heralds a new phase of growth and development. The Saturn return occurs approximately every 30 years, and heralds a new phase in the aging process when new realities and responsibilities must be faced.

== Predictive astrology ==
Astrological transits are a part of what is usually called predictive astrology, the claim of astrology to predict or forecast future trends and developments. Most astrologers nowadays regard the term 'prediction' as something of a misnomer, as modern astrology does not claim to directly predict future events as such. Instead it is claimed that an astrological pattern with regard to the future can correspond with any one of a variety of possibilities. What is in fact foretold is the trend of circumstances and the nature of the individual's reaction to the situation. In other words, progressed and transiting movements of the planets indicate phases in the individual's life when the potential shown in the natal chart will be given opportunities for development, whether through favourable or unfavourable circumstances.

In addition all modern astrologers stress the role of free will. It is asserted that astrology does not reveal fate or patterns which are 'written in stone', rather it reveals a person's strengths and weakness, talents and opportunities. The horoscope does not determine the future, but shows the possible paths that lie ahead so that the individual can choose between them. Modern astrologers argue that no planetary aspect brings a fate that cannot be counteracted in some way and some benefit derived from it - what actual events happen are largely dependent upon the freedom of choice of the individual. The role of the astrologer is to create self-knowledge and awareness of the movement of the planets and their meaning, so as to give the individual an improved ability to make reasoned and sensible life choices. In short, no modern astrologer would try to predict actual future events, or claim that the future was mapped out and determined.

Skeptics of astrology argue in response that stressing the role of vague, general trends and developments allows astrologers to avoid making verifiable predictions; and gives them the ability to attach significance to any number of arbitrary and unrelated events in a way that suits their purpose.

The transits are nowadays being considered an extremely important factor in making astrological predictions about important areas of human life like Career, Health, Marriage and relationships etc. It is often said that transits play the role of the delivery boy while operating Dashas convey the promise itself. The Transits have been given equal importance by both schools - Western as well as Indian Astrology and practitioners of both types of astrology use Transits extensively in arriving at any astrological conclusions.

== Interpretation ==
Interpretation of transits is usually fairly similar to the interpretation of progressions. In general however, transits primarily involve developments in the life circumstances outside the individual's control, while progressions involve psychological developments from within the individual.

The most important point to remember with transits is that the pattern of the natal chart always determines their value. So, for example if the sun and Jupiter are in a difficult aspect in the natal chart, a positive or easy aspect between transiting Jupiter and the natal sun will not produce the same expected benefit. Also, if planets are not aspected in the natal chart, transiting aspects will in general not have the same effect. In short each person carries the pattern of the natal chart with them all their lives, and the progressed and transiting movements of the planets indicate when the potential in the natal chart will be given opportunities for development.

Transits of the personal planets – Sun, Moon, Mercury, Venus and Mars – are usually not considered as important because they move so quickly through the zodiac. The transits of the slower moving planets - Jupiter, Saturn, Uranus, Neptune, and Pluto – are more powerful and noticeable, especially when they hit a personal planet or cardinal point.

== Transiting planets' aspects ==
The main significance of transiting planets is when they form aspects with planets in the natal chart. Transiting aspects are usually limited to an orb of one degree either side of the natal planet. The following is a brief description of the effect of transiting aspects:

=== Inner planets ===
Transits of the inner planets (including sun and moon) are generally not considered by astrologers to be of major importance, as they are of such short duration, and so have a limited effect. Most astrologers would not chart these transits on an ongoing basis as they occur so frequently and are so fleeting in their operation. The following are their main characteristics:

- Transiting Sun is at its peak for about two days and has an effect on health, energy and willpower in the area of life indicated by the natal planet, sign and house being transited. Greater creativity, activity and open expression.
- Transiting Moon lasts a few hours at most and affects mainly moods and feelings, not always consciously, according to the planet, sign and house being transited.
- Transiting Mercury is at its peak for only a day or two. A useful time for helping with backlogs of correspondence, making short journeys or visits. Thought patterns and focus will be altered positively or negatively depending on the nature of the aspect and aspected planet. A good time to write letters, e-mail, make phone calls and generally communicate with others. Combined with Venus, a Mercury transit can indicate entertaining, or perhaps giving a talk or lecture. Mercury transits to natal sun and ascendent indicate a good time for making minor changes - buying, selling and exchanging things.
- Transiting Venus is at its peak for about two days, and usually indicates feelings of love. Sometimes the influence is financial through receiving gifts or money. Transits to the sun and ascendant indicate a good time to buy new clothes or to beautify yourself, and transits to the moon a good time to beautify the home and buy new household goods. Transits to Mercury and Jupiter indicate a good time to entertain, and transits to its own place and to the midheaven, a good time to be entertained. Transits to Neptune are a good time to go to the cinema or theater, while Uranus transits are favorable for taking chances in romance.
- Transiting Mars energizes the areas of life related to the natal planet being effected. The person will be more energetic and be able to work harder than usual. But Mars can also promote tension and anger, so there is a need to watch the temper during a Mars transit, especially for transits with the moon. Plan to keep busy during a Mars transit so as to have an outlet for this excessive energy. There is also a need to take extra precautions against rushing and accidents. Be on especial guard when Mars transits the sun or the ascendant.

=== Outer planets ===
The transits of the outer planets are considered to be the most important by astrologers, as their effects can last for up to several years. The following are their main characteristics

- Transiting Jupiter Lasts some months and presents opportunities in the area of life involved by the aspected planet. Period of expansion and exceptional opportunities for achieving success in business, receiving benefits, good favour. Travelling, knowledge and new experiences are possible. Difficult aspects may lead to serious misjudgments, exaggerated, extravagant behaviour and sheer bad luck.
- Transiting Saturn Period of limitation, restriction, possible ill-health, depleted energy, losses, depressive moods, death, lack of cooperation, general misfortune. Respect and social status will be affected. Yet can also be a useful time for wise long-term planning, conserving energy, building up resources, study, serious contemplation of life and self. Patience will be needed as this is not a time to push ahead with plans and affairs, and forcing matters will not do much good. It is better to accept that this aspect will slow down the rhythm of life in the house or planet involved, showing which lessons of discipline and structure must be learned. A time to consolidate and prepare for more go-ahead indications in the chart.
- Transiting Uranus Period of unplanned, sudden drastic upheavals and changes can be expected. Dramatic turn to circumstances, with a new way of life opening. Possible period of inspiration, originality, creativeness, unconventional and rebellious behaviour. Greater desire for individuality, invention, expression and freedom, and new relationships are possible.
- Transiting Neptune Peculiar, strange, confusing and chaotic happenings likely, but also great creativity and inspiration. Neptune dissolves ideas and emotions in the house or planet which is aspected. Diffusion and idealization tends to occur and a tendency to fall into illusions or dreams. Spiritualization of the arena of life involved occurs, artistic practices, theater, spiritual or religious experiences are possible at this time. Difficult aspects may stimulate neurotic, escapist, suicidal and mentally disturbed tendencies. Victimization, delusions, misunderstandings or saviour roles are possible at this time, and over-involvement with alcohol, drugs.
- Transiting Pluto Period of major transformation in the life-pattern. Often the end of a 'chapter of experience' for the start of another, due to eruptive developments that have 'brewing up' under the surface for some time. Pluto will transform, renew and revolutionize the ideas or emotions in the house or the planet which is aspected. Deep psychological changes occur, cycles of either symbolic or real death and rebirth, obsessions, fateful encounters, power urges, power struggles and sexual issues. Old issues from past come to surface. Pluto exposes these issues so that their nature may be understood and the subject work to change them.

== Retrograde motion ==
The retrograde motion of a planet is its apparent backward motion through the sky caused by the Earth travelling past a slower-moving outer planet, or when the Earth is itself passed by a faster-moving inner planet. The outer planets are retrograde for over 40% of the time. In astrology, this backward movement was traditionally thought to be unlucky or inauspicious, as it went against the 'natural' order of movement (or 'direct movement' as it is known).

Most modern astrologers consider the retrograde movement of a planet to be malefic, indicative of stress or difficulty. For example, the retrograde movement of Mercury is commonly thought to signify difficulties in communication, such as post or emails going astray, verbal misunderstandings, and travel delays and frustrations. Some astrologers however, do not regard the change from direct to retrograde motion as automatically being one to repression and limitation (nor the reverse sudden release). Rather a change in either direction of movement is regarded by them as simply indicating a shift in a person's handling of that part of their life.

A transiting planet may pass over a particular spot in a natal chart and then turn retrograde, passing over the same spot again before it then goes 'direct' again, passing over the spot for a third time. This can bring a prolonged period of change into the person's life.

== Planetary returns ==
The planetary return in astrology is when the transiting planet returns to the precise position it was in at the moment of a person's birth. Symbolically this means that the planet is beginning a new cycle in a person's life. Returns apply also to the sun and moon - an astrologer would say that a person's birthday is technically their 'solar return'; for it marks the day when the sun returns to the same position in the zodiac as on a person's original birthday. The most important returns are those of the outer planets Jupiter, Saturn and Uranus. Half-returns (when the planet reaches the halfway point in its journey) are also important, especially in the case of Uranus, as many people may not live long enough to see or get the full benefit of its full return of 84 years.

Jupiter returns

Jupiter returns occur every twelve years or so, and indicate a new phase of growth and development in life. The first Jupiter return, at around age twelve, concerns the move into adolescence and puberty; while the second return at around age 24 concerns the first real moves into the adult world. The year of a Jupiter return will usually be a good one, with prizes won and grants awarded. Writers are often first published in this year, and sports people achieve their first important goals. Foreign travel and higher study are often indicated. The Jupiter return is the ideal time to push forward and be assertive, as efforts will usually be well rewarded.

Saturn returns

Saturn returns occur approximately every thirty years and indicate a phase in the aging process when new realities and responsibilities must be faced. The first Saturn return occurs at around age thirty and concerns the time when the first real responsibilities are felt. Many people will make a serious commitment at this time, perhaps to (or from) a marriage, starting a family or buying a home. It is also a time when many assess relationships that have failed and realise that it is time to end them. As regards work, many will reassess their career and question their progress to date. This can be a good time to change direction and retrain, even at the cost of a lower salary for a while.

The second return occurs at around age fifty nine and concerns the time when people reassess the next phase of their lives. Many people begin to consider retiring from full-time work and developing interests that have been neglected because of career and children. It is also the first time that many have to face the reality of approaching old age. It is important to have a constructive, practical attitude at this time, and not simply regard oneself as being 'on the scrapheap', as for most people there are still many good years ahead. The Saturn return is often a difficult and challenging time, but decisions taken and changes made usually work out well in the long term if they are sensible and followed through with.

Uranus returns

Uranus takes about 84 years to complete a full return. However, one of its most important influences is felt when it reaches the halfway stage in its journey, at around age 42. The Uranus half-return is the origin of what for many people is the 'mid-life crisis'. Women, especially those with children growing up and leaving home, may feel that life has passed them by. A lot of women also begin the pre-menopause stage at this time, and many men experience the 'male menopause'. Permanent and successful long-term relationships may be unsettled or disrupted by casual flirtations and affairs. The Uranus half-return can be stressful and tense, but also energising. It is the ideal time for people to break out of routine lifestyles that they have been stuck in for years, and develop new interests.

The full Uranus return takes place around age 84, and if the person is reasonably well and fit, it can herald a new and lively interest in life. For example, many creative people have completed great works after the age of 84 - Verdi composed his opera Falstaff, and Picasso painted many of his finest paintings late in life.
