= Cone of power =

Method of raising energy in ritual magic, especially in Wicca

The cone of power is a method of raising energy in ritual magic, especially in Wicca. The cone of power is visualized as a cone of energy that encompasses the circumference of the magic circle of Wiccans and tapering off to a point above the group. As a group, the cone is formed by the Wiccans standing in a circle, sometimes holding hands, and focusing on a single point above the group and in the centre of the circle. They then dance, drum, chant, or perform various other ritual gestures, in order to raise the energy and extend it upwards. When the state that these actions create has reached a peak, the ritual leader will signal the group and the energy is released upwards and the cone is “sent” towards the goal. This is called "Raising the Cone of Power".

== Uses ==
The cone of power is used in Wicca because it is believed that through work, Wiccans can raise energy from their bodies that can be directed towards their magical goals. This work is most commonly done through singing, dancing, chanting, and/or drumming. This energy is directed upwards towards their gods and their goals being achieved. Wiccans say that the cone of power has been utilized to end wars, but can function on a smaller level as well. The cone of power can be used to target a specific person, bring good fortune, or accomplish a specific goal. The goal of the cone of power depends entirely on the goals of the coven performing it.

== Importance of the cone shape ==
The cone itself holds significance in Wicca. The cone is most commonly linked to the chakras. The base of the cone correlates with the root chakra at the base of the spine. The root chakra forms the base of the cone. The cone then extends upwards to the crown chakra at the top of the head forming the point of the cone. The chakras themselves deal with the flow of energy in the body, and the cone of power is created by harnessing the body’s natural energy and directing it upwards.

The shape of the cone can also be broken down into a circle and a triangle. Both of these shapes have significance in Wicca. The circle represents the sun, unity, and rebirth. The triangle itself is associated with the elements and with pyramids. Pyramids represent higher spiritual desires. Wicca is a religion that is based on nature, so these symbols hold importance. The Triangle is also a symbol for the Triple Goddess, an important Wicca Goddess.

== Early examples ==
One of the first cited examples of the cone of power comes from Gerald Gardner. Gardner, the founder of the Gardnerian tradition of Wicca, who wrote in his early writing that his New Forest Coven performed a cone of power ritual to keep Hitler’s troops from invading Great Britain. Other early examples where witches have been reported to use the cone of power against enemies are:

- 1588, cone of power helped to defeat the Spanish Armada
- 1805, cone of power raised against Napoleon's planned invasion
- 1971, California witches gathered and performed a cone of power ritual to end the war in Vietnam.

== Increasing effectiveness ==
There are a few ways Wiccans are taught to increase the effectiveness of the cone of power ritual. The overall success of the magic is first dependent on the intention or goal of the people performing it. The best way to increase the overall effectiveness of the ritual is to work magic in a group. The methods taught to increase the success are grounding and centering energy, creating a sacred space, specifically a circle, and training to focus attention on the stated goal of the magical ritual. This enables the achievement of the ecstatic trance required to release the energy upwards and send it to the stated goal.
