= Amniomancy =

Method of divination

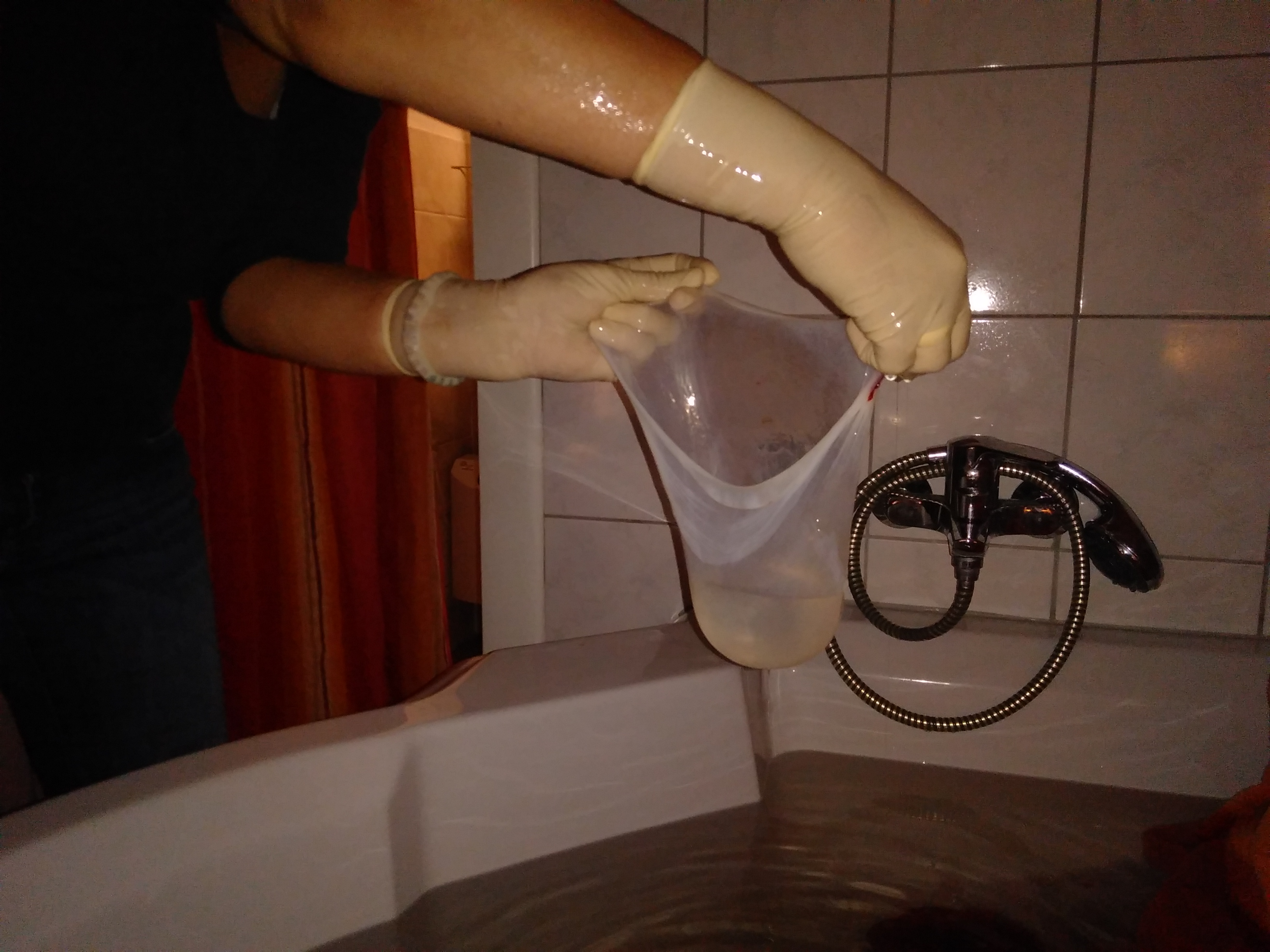
Amniotic sac

Amniomancy is a method of divination whereby the future life of a child is predicted from the caul covering their head at birth. The colour and consistency of the caul are used to interpret the future. A vivid colour is supposed to reflect a vivid life whilst the opposite is also true.

Amniomancy dates to at least the times of the Roman Empire.

The word amniomancy comes from the Latin amnion, meaning membrane. The French proverb Il est ne coiffe is thought to originate from this practice.
