= Lampadomancy =

Fortune-telling with a flame

Lampadomancy is a form of divination using an oil lamp or candle. It was used in ancient Egypt.
