= Haruspex =

Person trained to practise a form of divination

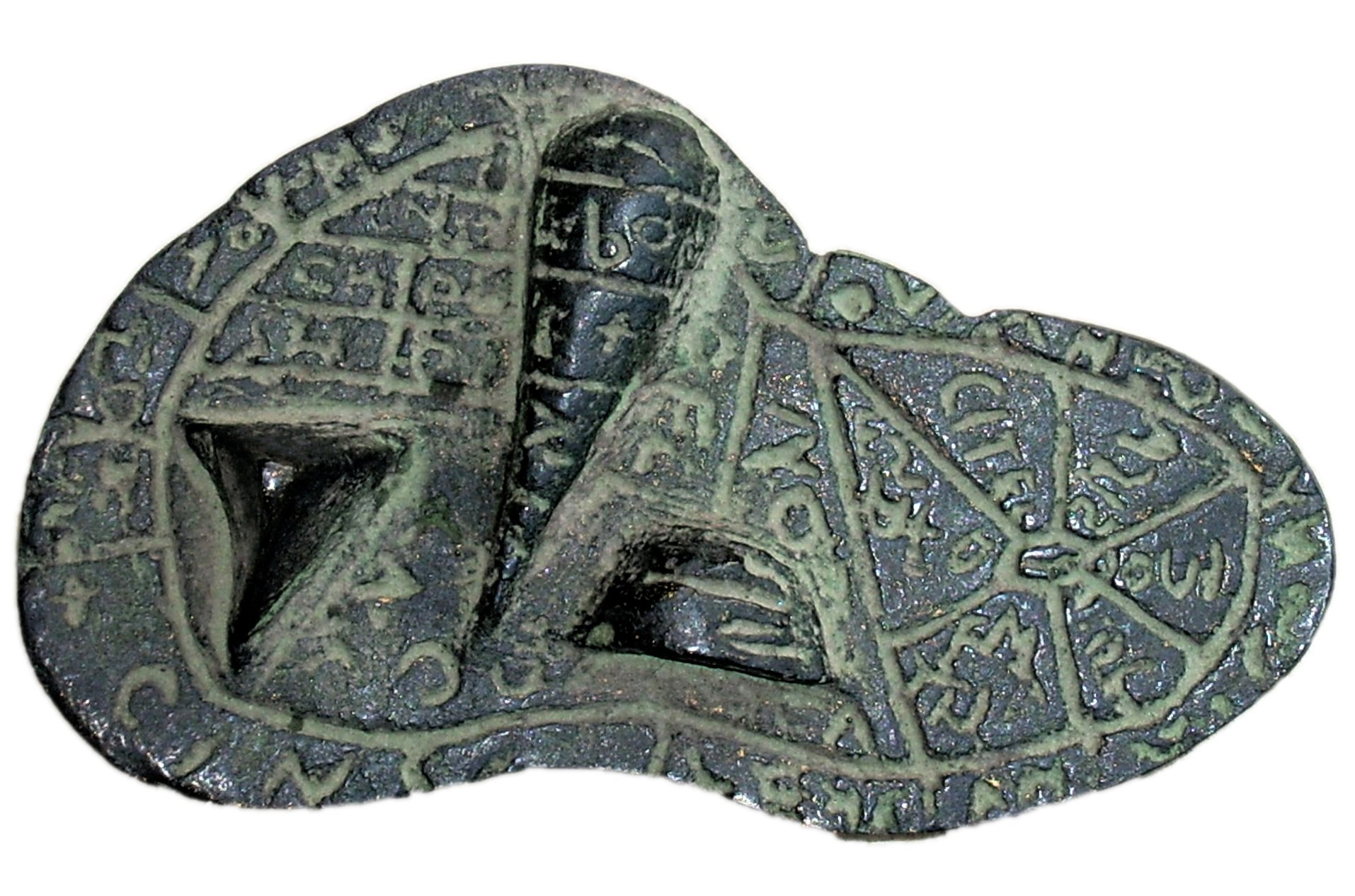
The Liver of Piacenza, a bronze diagram of the sheep's liver found near Piacenza with Etruscan inscriptions

A haruspex (Note: /həˈrʌ.spɛks/ hə-RUH-spehks, plural haruspices /həˈrʌ.spɪˌsiz/ hə-RUH-spih-sees, also called aruspex) was a person trained to practise divination by the inspection of the entrails (Note: exta—hence also extispicy (L. extispicium)) of sacrificed animals, especially the livers of sacrificed sheep and poultry, a practice called haruspicy in the Ancient Roman religion. (Note: /həˈrʌ.spɪˌsiː/ hə-RUH-speh-see (L. haruspicina)) Various ancient cultures of the Near East, such as the Babylonians, also read omens specifically from the liver, a practice also known by the Greek term hepatoscopy (also hepatomancy).

The Roman concept is directly derived from Etruscan religion, as one of the three branches of the disciplina Etrusca.

== Etymology ==
The Latin terms haruspex and haruspicina are from an archaic word, hīra = "entrails, intestines" (cognate with hernia = "protruding viscera" and hira = "empty gut"; PIE *ǵʰer-) and from the root spec- = "to watch, observe". The Greek ἡπατοσκοπία hēpatoskopia is from hēpato- = "liver" and skop- = "to examine".

== Ancient Near East ==
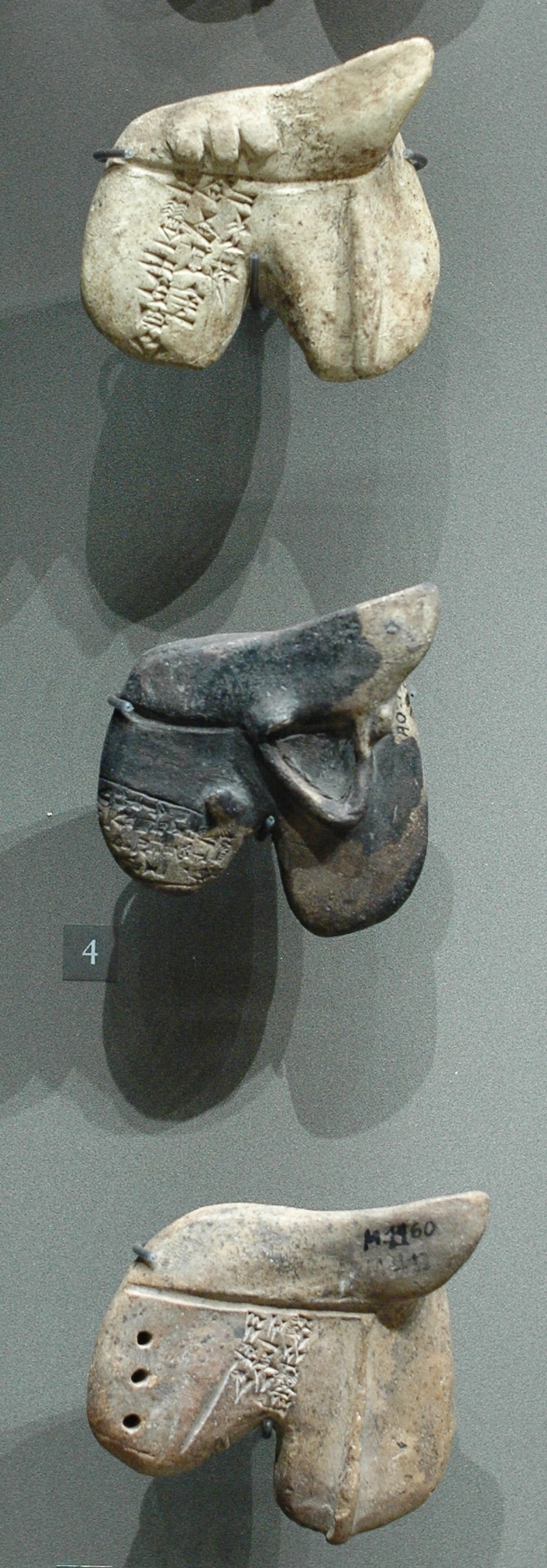
Akkadian language clay sheep liver models written in a local dialect, recovered from the palace at Mari, dated to the 19th or 18th century BCE.

The spread of hepatoscopy is one of the clearest examples of cultural contact in the orientalizing period. It must have been a case of East–West understanding on a relatively high, technical level. The mobility of migrant charismatics is the natural prerequisite for this diffusion, the international role of sought-after specialists, who were, as far as their art was concerned, nevertheless bound to their father-teachers. We cannot expect to find many archaeologically identifiable traces of such people, other than some exceptional instances.

— Walter Burkert, 1992. The Orientalizing Revolution: Near Eastern Influence on Greek Culture in the Early Archaic Age (Thames and Hudson), p. 51.

The Babylonians were famous for hepatoscopy. This practice is mentioned in the Book of Ezekiel 21:21:

For the king of Babylon standeth at the parting of the way, at the head of the two ways, to use divination; he shaketh the arrows to and fro, he inquireth of the teraphim, he looketh in the liver.

One Babylonian clay model of a sheep's liver, dated between 1900 and 1600 BCE, is conserved in the British Museum.

The Assyro-Babylonian tradition was also adopted in Hittite religion. At least thirty-six liver-models have been excavated at Hattusa. Of these, the majority are inscribed in Akkadian, but a few examples also have inscriptions in the native Hittite language, indicating the adoption of haruspicy as part of the native, vernacular cult.

== Ancient Italy ==
Roman haruspicy was a form of communication with the gods. Rather than strictly predicting future events, this form of Roman divination allowed humans to discern the attitudes of the gods and react in a way that would maintain harmony between the human and divine worlds (pax deorum). Before taking important actions, especially in battle, Romans conducted animal sacrifices to discover the will of the gods according to the information gathered through reading the animals' entrails. The entrails (most importantly the liver, but also the lungs and heart) contained a large number of signs that indicated the gods' approval or disapproval. These signs could be interpreted according to the appearance of the organs, for example, if the liver was "smooth, shiny and full" or "rough and shrunken". The Etruscans looked for the caput iocineris, or "head of the liver". It was considered a bad omen if this part was missing from the animal's liver. The haruspex would then study the flat visceral side of the liver after examining the caput iocineris.

Haruspicy in Ancient Italy originated with the Etruscans. Textual evidence for Etruscan divination comes from an Etruscan inscription: the priest Laris Pulenas' (250–200 BCE) epitaph mentions a book he wrote on haruspicy. A collection of sacred texts called the Etrusca disciplina, written in Etruscan, were essentially guides on different forms of divination, including haruspicy and augury. In addition, a number of archeological artifacts depict Etruscan haruspicy. These include a bronze mirror with an image of a haruspex dressed in Etruscan priest's clothing, holding a liver while a crowd gathers near him. Another significant artifact relating to haruspicy in Ancient Italy is the Piacenza Liver. This bronze model of a sheep's liver was found by chance by a farmer in 1877. Names of gods are etched into the surface and organized into different sections. Artifacts depicting haruspicy exist from the ancient Roman world as well, such as stone relief carvings located in Trajan's Forum.

At the most influential time of haruspicy, the Roman senate decreed that 'a certain number of young Etruscans' should be instructed in it to provide haruspices for the state. These Etruscans were later appointed as Roman augurs.

In later days when haruspicy became a neglected art, Emperor Claudius, who ruled from AD 41 to 54, attempted to revive it. He directed the Senate to pass a decree to examine what parts of it should be "maintained or strengthened".

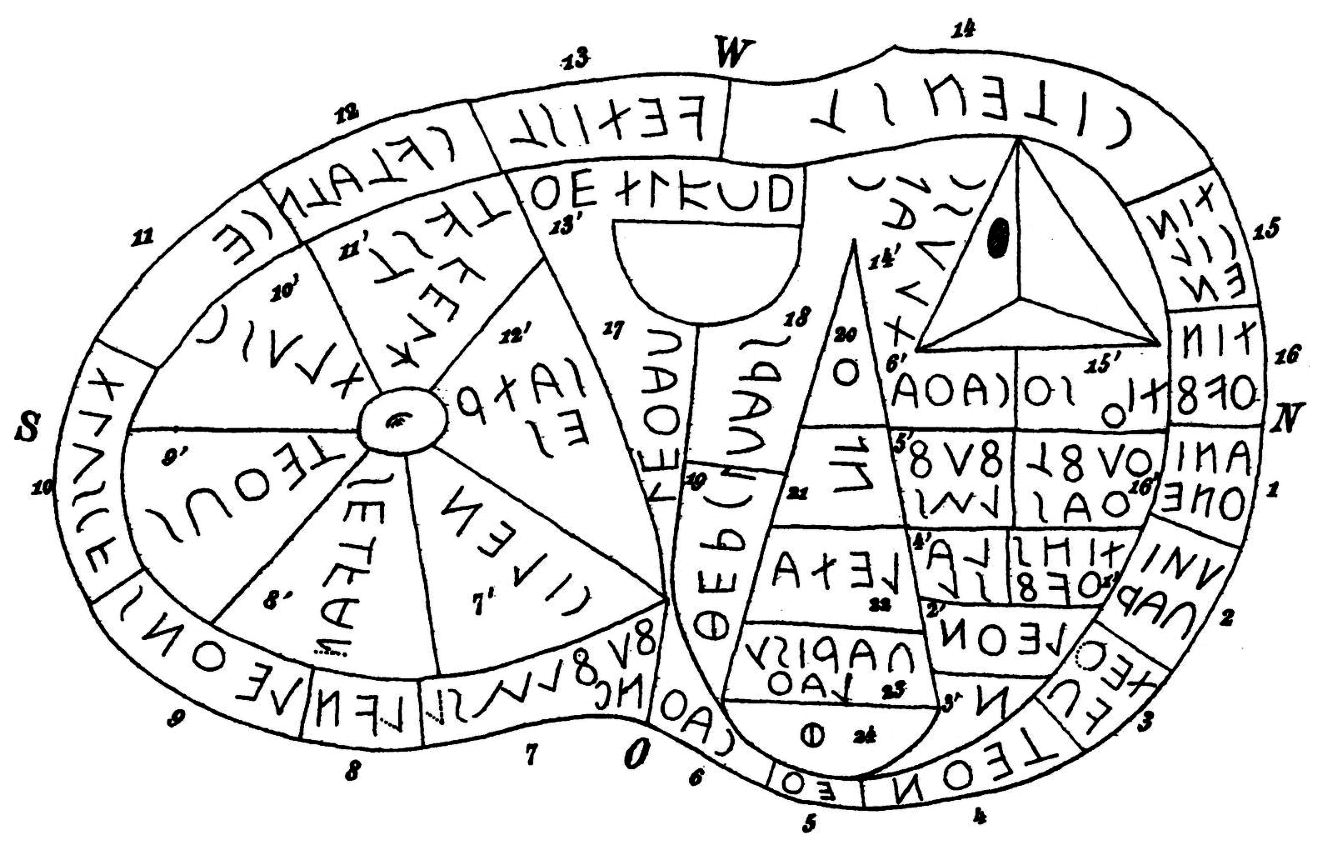
Diagram of the bronze liver of Piacenza

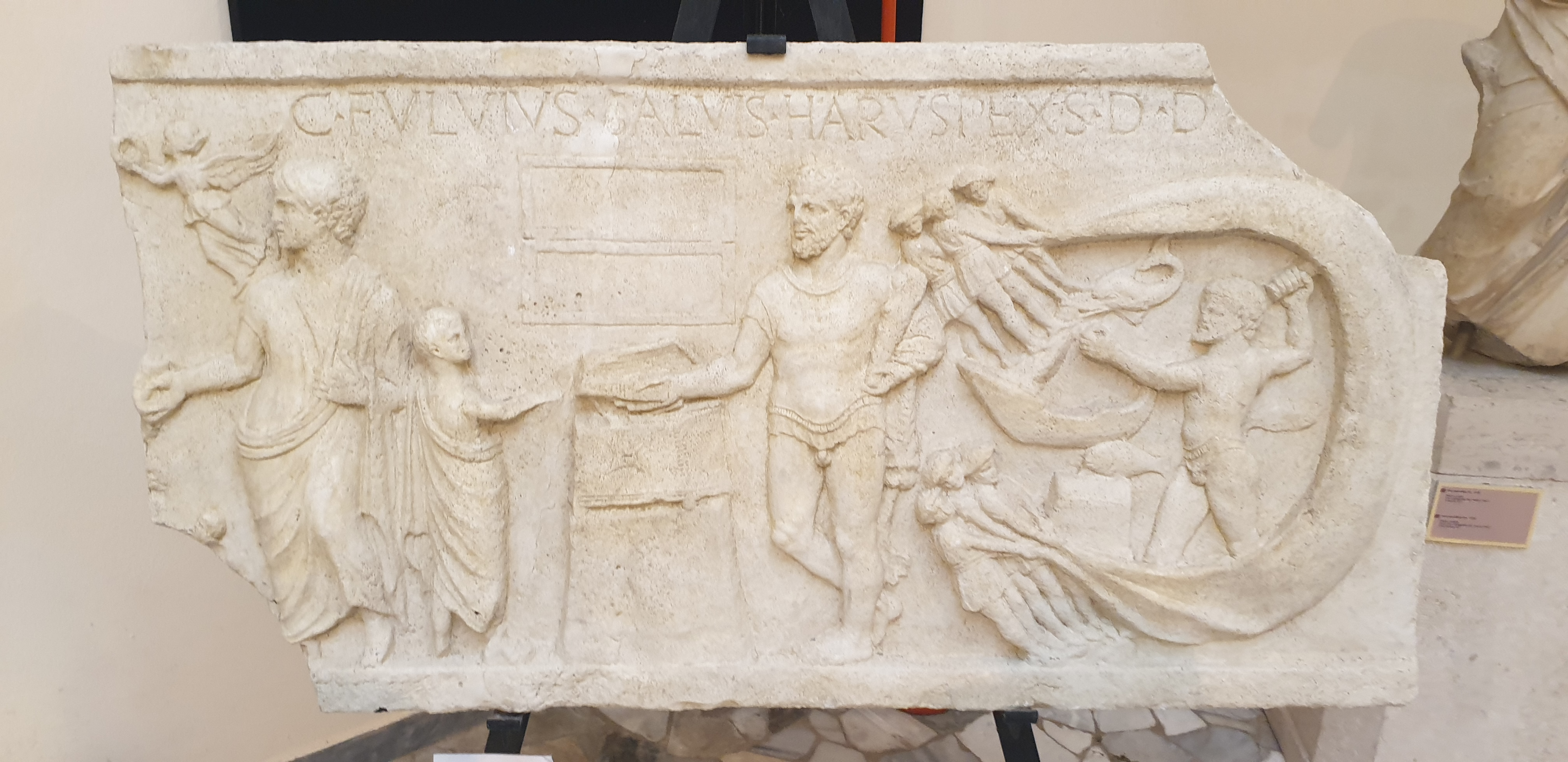
Relief depicting a haruspex from the Roman Temple of Hercules

== Northeast Africa ==
In southwest Ethiopia and adjacent area of South Sudan, a number of ethnic communities have had the practice of reading animal entrails to divine the future. Some of the groups that have been documented as having this practice include Suri, Mursi, Topsa, Nyangatom, Didinga, Murle, Mekan, Turkana, Konso, Dime, Karamojong, Dodoth, Kalenjin.

Haruspicy has also been practiced in Kenya, such as the Kamba and the Kipsigis.

== See also ==
- Anthropomancy
- Augur
- Auspice

== Bibliography ==
- Walter Burkert, 1992. The Orientalizing Revolution: Near Eastern Influence on Greek Culture in the Early Archaic Age (Thames and Hudson), pp. 46–51.
- Collins, Derek (Fall 2008). "Mapping the Entrails: The Practice of Greek Hepatoscopy". The American Journal of Philology 129, No. 3: 319-345. JSTOR 27566714.
- Hans Gustav Güterbock, "Hittite liver models"; Archived 2013-10-29 at the Wayback Machine. In: Language, Literature and History (FS Reiner) (1987), 147–153, reprinted in Hoffner (ed.) Selected Writings, Assyriological Studies no. 26 (1997).
- Marie-Laurence Haack, Les haruspices dans le monde romain (Bordeaux: Ausonius, 2003).
