= History of magic (disambiguation) =

History of magic refers to the entire history of events that from someone's perception were impossible to occur.

History of magic may also refer to:

- Magic (illusion)
- Magic (supernatural)
  - Magic in the Greco-Roman world
  - Medieval European magic
  - Renaissance magic
  - Baroque magic
  - Magick

== See also ==
- Christian views on magic
- European witchcraft
- History of religion
- Magic and religion
- Shamanism
