= Ars Magica (disambiguation) =

Ars Magica is a 1987 role-playing game.

Ars Magica may also refer to:

- Ars Magica (novel), a 2007 novel by Nerea Riesco
- Ars Magica, a 1989 novel by Judith Tarr

== See also ==
- Artes magicae, arts prohibited by canon law
