= Berthold Furtmeyr =

German artist (fl. 1740–1501)

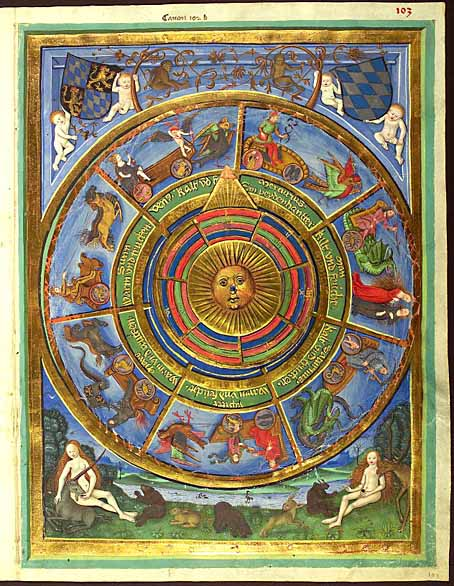
Astrolabe, fol. 103 of the Heidelberger Schicksalsbuch.

Berthold Furtmeyr was a German miniaturist, attested as a citizen of Regensburg between 1470 and 1501.

He contributed to an Old Testament manuscript of G. Rorer between 1470 and 1472. His main work is the decoration of a missal of five volumes for archbishop Bernhard von Rohr, completed in 1481 or 1482.

== Literature ==
- Edeltraud Jantschke: Stilkritische Beschreibung der Miniaturen des Regensburger Illuministen Berthold Furtmeyr. Erlangen 1951.
- Alheidis von Rohr: Berthold Furtmeyr und die Regensburger Buchmalerei des 15. Jahrhunderts. Bonn 1967
- Johannes Janota (Hrsg.): Die Furtmeyr-Bibel in der Universitätsbibliothek Augsburg. Kommentar. Augsburg: Presse-Druck- und Verlags-GmbH 1990
