= Renaissance magic =

Magical science during the Renaissance

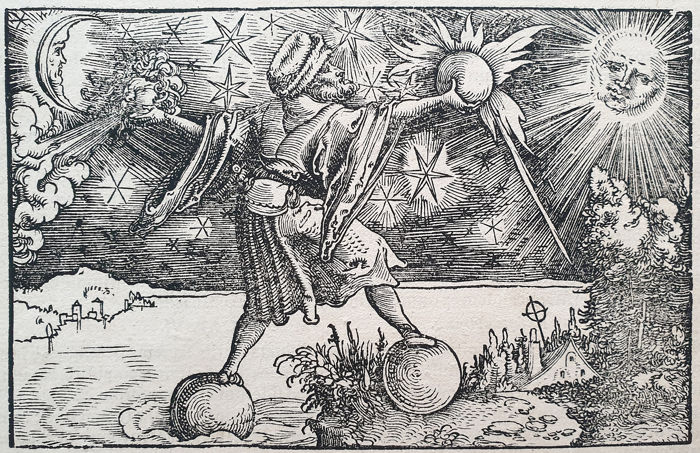
Woodcut illustration from an edition of Pliny the Elder's Naturalis Historia (1582)

Renaissance magic was a resurgence in Hermeticism and Neoplatonic varieties of the magical arts which arose along with Renaissance humanism in the 15th and 16th centuries CE. During the Renaissance period, magic and occult practices underwent significant changes that reflected shifts in cultural, intellectual, and religious perspectives. C. S. Lewis, in his work on English literature, highlighted the transformation in how magic was perceived and portrayed. In medieval stories, magic had a fantastical and fairy-like quality, while in the Renaissance, it became more complex and tied to the idea of hidden knowledge that could be explored through books and rituals. This change is evident in the works of authors like Spenser, Marlowe, Chapman, and Shakespeare, who treated magic as a serious and potentially dangerous pursuit.

Heinrich Cornelius Agrippa, a scholar, physician, and astrologer, popularized the Hermetic and Cabalistic magic of Marsilio Ficino and Giovanni Pico della Mirandola. Agrippa's ideas on magic were revolutionary, and he faced persecution for his criticism of authorities and ruling classes. His work, De occulta philosophia, explored both benevolent and malevolent magic, but he rejected forbidden forms of sorcery. Similarly, Paracelsus, a Swiss physician and alchemist, combined medical practice with astrology. He introduced elemental beings and viewed the cosmos as interconnected, assigning spiritual significance to natural elements.

Nostradamus, a French astrologer and reputed scryer, gained fame for allegedly predicting future events through his prophecies. His works contained cryptic verses and calendars, attracting both admirers and skeptics. Johann Weyer, a Dutch physician and disciple of Agrippa, advocated against the persecution of witches and argued that accusations of witchcraft were often based on mental disturbances. John Dee, an English mathematician and occultist, explored alchemy, divination, and Hermetic philosophy. His collaboration with Edward Kelley resulted in a system of elaborate angelic communications and mystical teachings known as Enochian magic.

Collectively, these figures wove a complex fabric of Renaissance magic, a time marked by a blending of mystical and scientific ideas, as well as a redefinition of the perception of magic. This era saw magic evolve from a fanciful element in stories to a domain of spiritual exploration and hidden knowledge.

== History ==
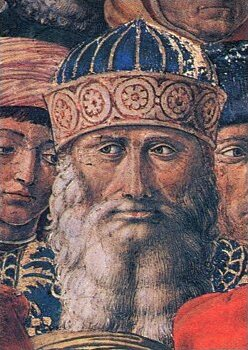
Portrait of Gemistus Pletho, detail of a fresco by acquaintance Benozzo Gozzoli, Palazzo Medici Riccardi, Florence, Italy

Both bourgeoisie and nobility in the 15th and 16th centuries showed great fascination with the seven artes magicae (prohibited arts), which exerted an exotic charm by their ascription to Arabic, Jewish, Graeco-Roman, and Egyptian sources. There was great uncertainty in distinguishing practices of vain superstition, blasphemous occultism, and perfectly sound scholarly knowledge or pious ritual. Intellectual and spiritual tensions erupted in the Early Modern witch craze, further reinforced by the turmoils of the Protestant Reformation, especially in Germany, England, and Scotland. The people during this time found that the existence of magic was something that could answer the questions that they could not explain through science. To them it was suggesting that while science may explain reason, magic could explain "unreason".

=== Late Middle Ages to early Renaissance ===
==== Georgius Gemistus Pletho ====
Georgius Gemistus Pletho (c. 1355/1360 – 1452/1454) was a Greek scholar and one of the most renowned philosophers of the late Byzantine era. He was a chief pioneer of the revival of Greek scholarship in Western Europe. As revealed in his last literary work, the Nomoi or Book of Laws, which he only circulated among close friends, he rejected Christianity in favour of a return to the worship of the classical Hellenic Gods, mixed with ancient wisdom based on Zoroaster and the Magi. Plethon may also have been the source for Ficino's Orphic system of natural magic.

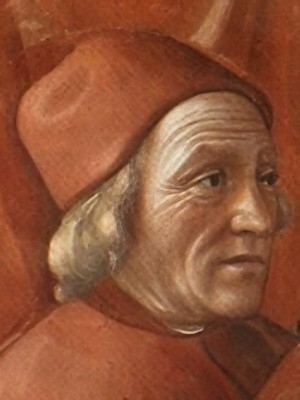
Marsilio Ficino from a fresco painted by Domenico Ghirlandaio in the Tornabuoni Chapel, Santa Maria Novella, Florence

==== Marsilio Ficino ====
Marsilio Ficino (1433–1499) was an Italian scholar and Catholic priest who was one of the most influential humanist philosophers of the early Italian Renaissance. He was an astrologer, a reviver of Neoplatonism in touch with the major academics of his day, and the first translator of Plato's complete extant works into Latin. His Florentine Academy, an attempt to revive Plato's Academy, influenced the direction and tenor of the Italian Renaissance and the development of European philosophy.

Ficino's letters, extending over the years 1474–1494, survive and have been published. He wrote De amore (Of Love) in 1484. De vita libri tres (Three books on life), or De triplici vita (The Book of Life), published in 1489, provides a great deal of medical and astrological advice for maintaining health and vigor, as well as espousing the Neoplatonist view of the world's ensoulment and its integration with the human soul:

There will be some men or other, superstitious and blind, who see life plain in even the lowest animals and the meanest plants, but do not see life in the heavens or the world ... Now if those little men grant life to the smallest particles of the world, what folly! what envy! neither to know that the Whole, in which 'we live and move and have our being,' is itself alive, nor to wish this to be so.

One metaphor for this integrated "aliveness" is Ficino's astrology. In the Book of Life, he details the interlinks between behavior and consequence. It talks about a list of things that hold sway over a man's destiny.

His medical works exerted considerable influence on Renaissance physicians such as Paracelsus, with whom he shared the perception on the unity of the micro- and macrocosmos, and their interactions, through somatic and psychological manifestations, with the aim to investigate their signatures to cure diseases. Those works, which were very popular at the time, dealt with astrological and alchemical concepts. Thus Ficino came under the suspicion of heresy; especially after the publication of the third book in 1489, which contained specific instructions on healthful living in a world of demons and other spirits.

==== Giovanni Pico della Mirandola ====
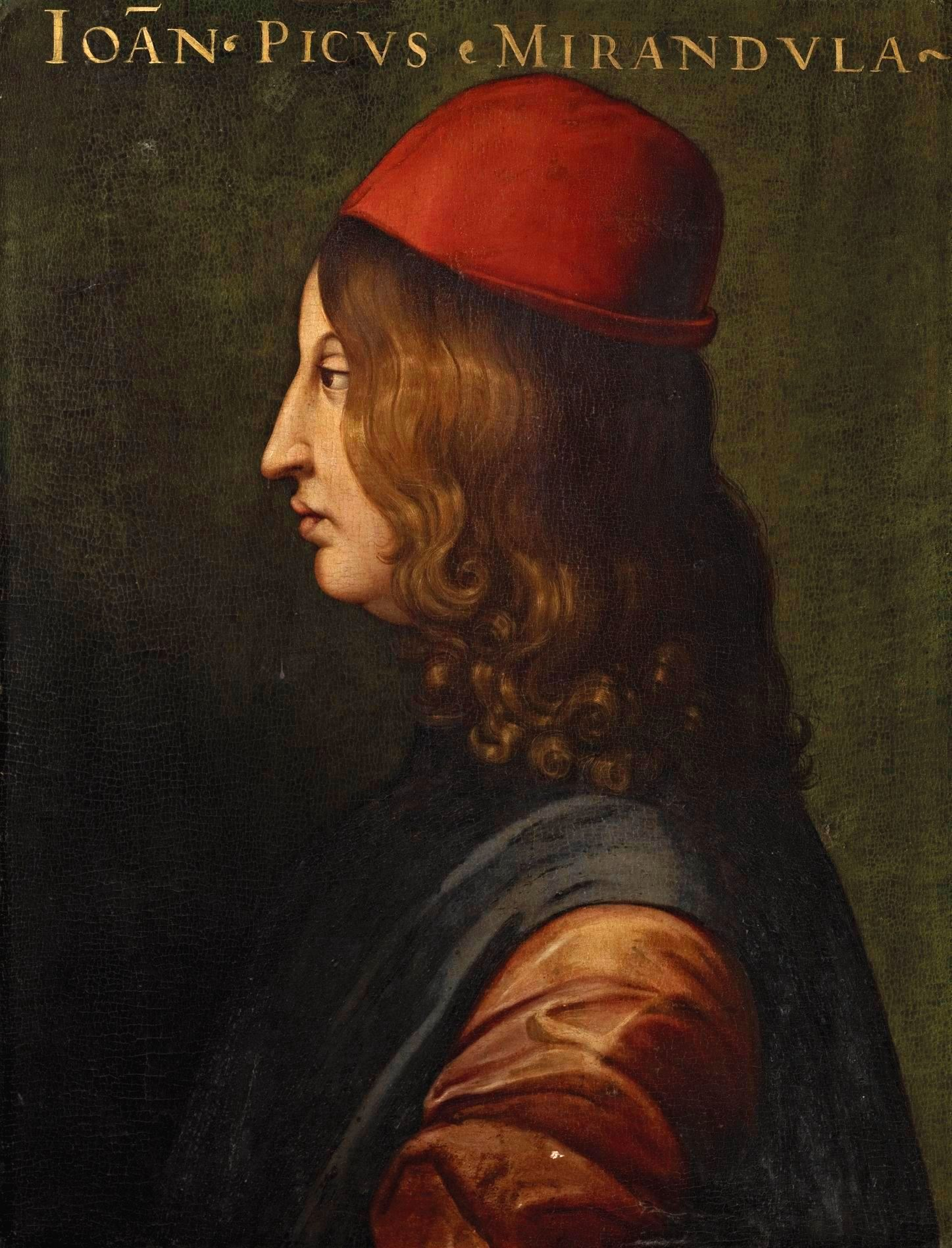
Portrait from the Uffizi Gallery, in Florence

Giovanni Pico della Mirandola (1463–1494) was an Italian Renaissance nobleman and philosopher. He is famed for the events of 1486, when, at the age of 23, he proposed to defend 900 theses on religion, philosophy, natural philosophy, and magic against all comers, for which he wrote the Oration on the Dignity of Man, which has been called the "Manifesto of the Renaissance", and a key text of Renaissance humanism and of what has been called the "Hermetic Reformation". He was the founder of the tradition of Christian Kabbalah, a key element of early modern Western esotericism. The 900 Theses was the first printed book to be universally banned by the Church.

In November 1484, he settled for a time in Florence and met Lorenzo de' Medici and Marsilio Ficino. It was an astrologically auspicious day that Ficino had chosen to publish his translations of the works of Plato from Greek into Latin, under Lorenzo's enthusiastic patronage. Pico appears to have charmed both men, and despite Ficino's philosophical differences, he was convinced of their Saturnine affinity and the divine providence of his arrival. Lorenzo would support and protect Pico until his death in 1492.

Pico spent several months in Perugia and nearby Fratta. It was there, as he wrote to Ficino, that "divine Providence ... caused certain books to fall into my hands. They are Chaldean books ... of Esdras, of Zoroaster and of Melchior, oracles of the magi, which contain a brief and dry interpretation of Chaldean philosophy, but full of mystery." It was also in Perugia that Pico was introduced to the mystical Hebrew Kabbalah, which fascinated him, as did the late classical Hermetic writers, such as Hermes Trismegistus. The Kabbalah and Hermetica were thought in Pico's time to be as ancient as the Old Testament.

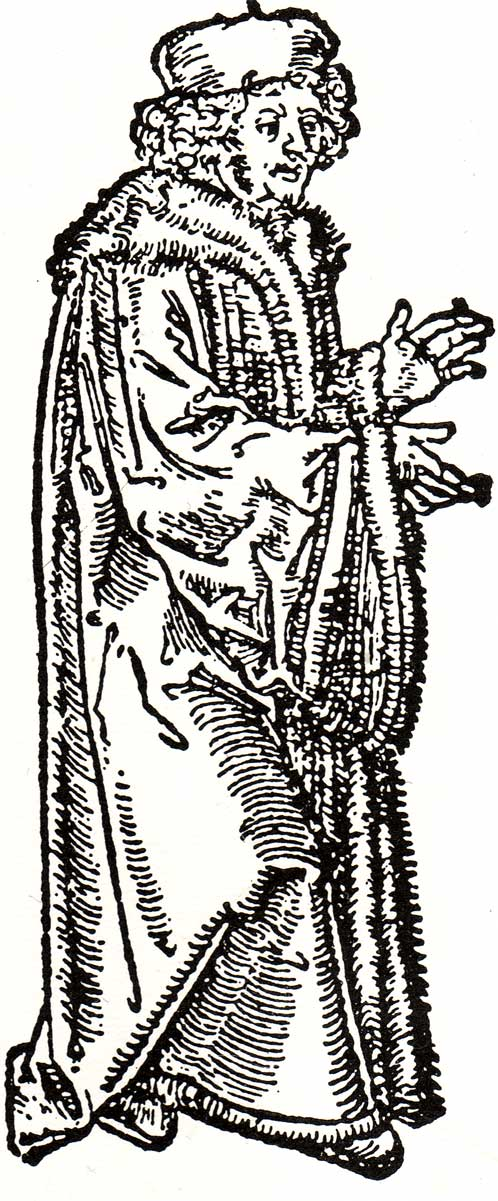
Johann Reuchlin, woodcut depiction from 1516

Pico's tutor in Kabbalah was Rabbi Johannan Alemanno (1435/8–c. 1510), who argued that the study and mastery of magic was to be regarded as the final stage of one's intellectual and spiritual education. This contact, initiated as a result of Christian interest in Jewish mystical sources, resulted in unprecedented mutual influence between Jewish and Christian Renaissance thought. The most original of Pico's 900 theses concerned the Kabbalah. As a result, he became the founder of the tradition known as Christian Kabbalah, which went on to be a central part of early modern Western esotericism.

Pico's approach to different philosophies was one of extreme syncretism, placing them in parallel, it has been claimed, rather than attempting to describe a developmental history. Pico based his ideas chiefly on Plato, as did his teacher, Marsilio Ficino, but retained a deep respect for Aristotle. Although he was a product of the studia humanitatis (study of the humanities), Pico was constitutionally an eclectic, and in some respects he represented a reaction against the exaggerations of pure humanism, defending what he believed to be the best of the medieval and Islamic commentators, such as Averroes and Avicenna, on Aristotle in a famous long letter to Ermolao Barbaro in 1485.

It was always Pico's aim to reconcile the schools of Plato and Aristotle since he believed they used different words to express the same concepts. It was perhaps for this reason his friends called him "Princeps Concordiae", or "Prince of Harmony" (a pun on Prince of Concordia, one of his family's holdings). Similarly, Pico believed that an educated person should also study Hebrew and Talmudic sources, and the Hermetics, because he thought they represented the same concept of God that is seen in the Old Testament, but in different words.

In 1490 Pico met with Johannes Reuchlin (1455–1522), who became heir to his Kabbalistic doctrines. Following Pico, Reuchlin seemed to find in the Kabbala a profound theosophy which might be of the greatest service for the defence of Christianity and the reconciliation of science with the mysteries of faith, a common notion at that time. Reuchlin's mystico-cabalistic ideas and objects were expounded in the De Verbo Mirifico, and finally in the De Arte Cabalistica (1517).

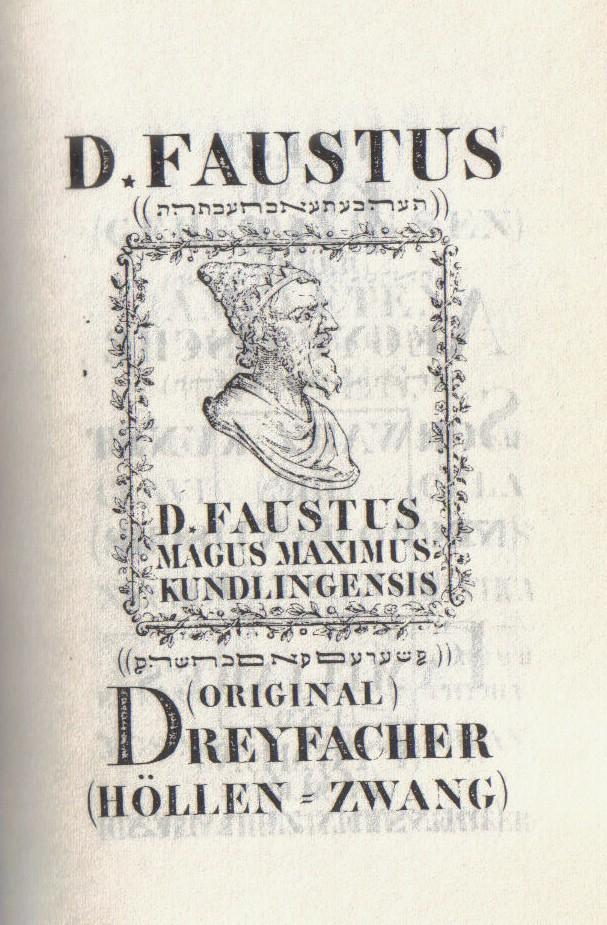
Title page of one of the Höllenzwang grimoires attributed to D. Faustus Magus Maximus Kundlingensis (18th century)

==== The legendary Doctor Faustus ====
Johann Georg Faust (c. 1480 or 1466 – c. 1541) was a German itinerant alchemist, astrologer and magician of the German Renaissance. Because of his early treatment as a figure in legend and literature, it is difficult to establish historical facts about his life with any certainty.

For the year 1506, there is a record of Faust appearing as performer of magical tricks and horoscopes in Gelnhausen. Over the following 30 years, there are numerous similar records spread over southern Germany. Faust appeared as physician, doctor of philosophy, alchemist, magician and astrologer, and was often accused as a fraud. The church denounced him as a blasphemer in league with the devil.

On 23 February 1520, Faust was in Bamberg, doing a horoscope for the bishop and the town, for which he received the sum of 10 gulden. In 1528, Faust visited Ingolstadt, whence he was banished shortly after.

In 1532 he seems to have tried to enter Nürnberg, according to an unflattering note made by the junior mayor of the city to "deny free passage to the great nigromancer and sodomite Doctor Faustus" (Doctor Faustus, dem großen Sodomiten und Nigromantico in furt glait ablainen). Later records give a more positive verdict; thus the Tübingen professor Joachim Camerarius in 1536 recognises Faust as a respectable astrologer, and physician Philipp Begardi of Worms in 1539 praises his medical knowledge. The last direct attestation of Faust dates to 25 June 1535, when his presence was recorded in Münster during the Anabaptist rebellion.

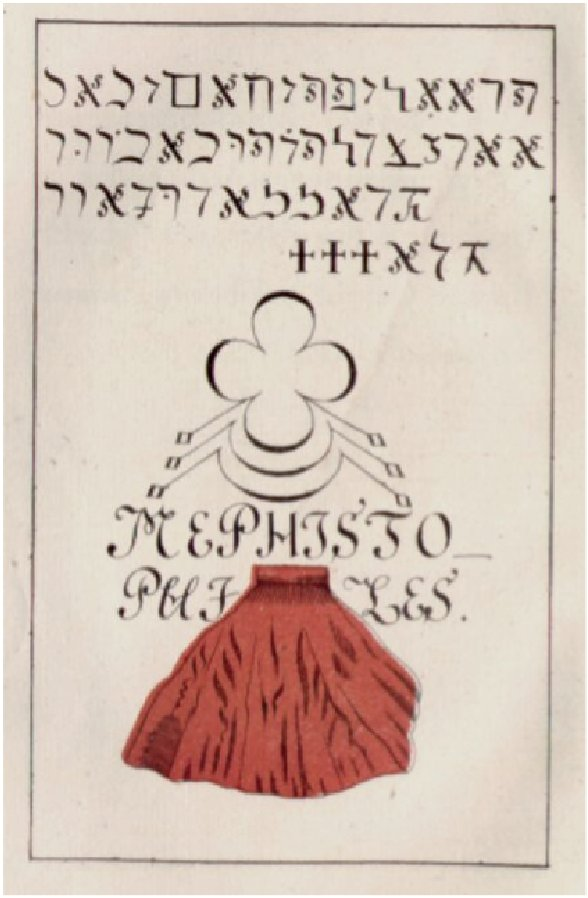
Page of Praxis Magia Faustiana (1527)

Doctor Faust became the subject of folk legend in the decades after his death, transmitted in chapbooks beginning in the 1580s, and was notably adapted by Christopher Marlowe in his play The Tragical History of the Life and Death of Doctor Faustus (1604). The Faustbuch tradition survived throughout the early modern period, and the legend was again adapted in Johann Wolfgang von Goethe's closet drama Faust (1808), Hector Berlioz's musical composition La damnation de Faust (premiered 1846), and Franz Liszt's Faust Symphony of 1857.

There are several prints of grimoires or magical texts attributed to Faust. Some of them are artificially dated to his lifetime, either to "1540", or to "1501", "1510", etc., some even to unreasonably early dates, such as "1405" and "1469". The prints in fact date to the late 16th century, from ca. 1580, i.e. the same period of the development of the Volksbuch tradition. (Note: Engel (1885) is aware of fifteen prints (nos. 335–349, pp. 154–157) dated between 1501 and 1540. Engel's no. 334 (Dr. Johann Faustus Miracul- Kunst- und Wunder-Buch, reprinted in Kloster vol. 2, 852–897) is dated MCDXXXXXXIX, i.e. 1469.)

==== Other early writers ====
Other writers on occult or magical topics during this period include:

- Johannes Hartlieb (1410-1468) wrote a compendium on herbs in ca. 1440, and in 1456 the puch aller verpoten kunst, ungelaubens und der zaubrey (book on all forbidden arts, superstition and sorcery) on the artes magicae, containing the oldest known description of witches' flying ointment.
- Thomas Norton (b. <1436 – d. c. 1513) was an English poet and alchemist best known for his 1477 alchemical poem, The Ordinal of Alchemy.
- Johannes Trithemius (1462–1516) Trithemius' most famous work, Steganographia (written c. 1499; published Frankfurt, 1606), was placed on the Index Librorum Prohibitorum in 1609 and removed in 1900. This book is in three volumes, and appears to be about magic – specifically, about using spirits to communicate over long distances. However, since the publication of a decryption key to the first two volumes in 1606, they have been known to be actually concerned with cryptography and steganography. Until recently, the third volume was widely still believed to be solely about magic, but the magical formulae have now been shown to be covertexts for yet more material on cryptography.

=== Renaissance and Reformation ===
C. S. Lewis in his 1954 English Literature in the Sixteenth Century, Excluding Drama differentiates what he takes to be the change of character in magic as practiced in the Middle Ages as opposed to the Renaissance:

Only an obstinate prejudice about this period could blind us to a certain change which comes over the merely literary texts as we pass from the Middle Ages to the sixteenth century. In medieval stories there is, in one sense, plenty of “magic”. Merlin does this or that “by his subtilty”, Bercilak resumes his severed head. But all these passages have unmistakably the note of “faerie” about them. But in Spenser, Marlowe, Chapman, and Shakespeare the subject is treated quite differently. “He to his studie goes”; books are opened, terrible words pronounced, souls imperiled. The medieval author seems to write for a public to whom magic, like knight-errantry, is part of the furniture of romance: the Elizabethan, for a public who feel that it might be going on in the next street. [...] Neglect of this point has produced strange readings of The Tempest, which is in reality [...] Shakespeare’s play on magia as Macbeth is his play on goeteia.

==== Heinrich Cornelius Agrippa ====
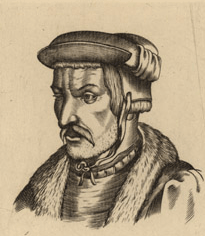
Woodcut print portrait of Agrippa

The Cabalistic and Hermetic magic, which was created by Marsilio Ficino (1433–1499) and Giovanni Pico della Mirandola (1463–1494), was made popular in northern Europe, most notably England, by Heinrich Cornelius Agrippa (1486–1535), via his De occulta philosophia libra tres (1531–1533). Agrippa had revolutionary ideas about magical theory and procedure that were widely circulated in the Renaissance among those who sought out knowledge of occult philosophy.

Agrippa himself was famous as a scholar, physician jurist, and astrologer, but throughout his life he was continually persecuted as a heretic. His problems stemmed not only from his reputation as a conjurer, but also from his vehement criticism of the vices of the ruling classes and of the most respected intellectual and religious authorities.

While some scholars and students viewed Agrippa as a source of intellectual inspiration, to many others, his practices were dubious and his beliefs serious. The transitive side of magic is explored in Agrippa's De occulta philosophia, and at times it is vulgarized.

Considerable space is devoted to examples of evil sorcery in De occulta philosophia, and one might easily come away from the treatise with the impression that Agrippa found witchcraft as intriguing as benevolent magic.

However, at the peak of the witch trials, there was a certain danger to be associated with witchcraft or sorcery, and most learned authors took pains to clearly renounce the practice of forbidden arts. Thus, Agrippa while admitting that natural magic is the highest form of natural philosophy unambiguously rejects all forms of sorcery (goetia or necromancy).

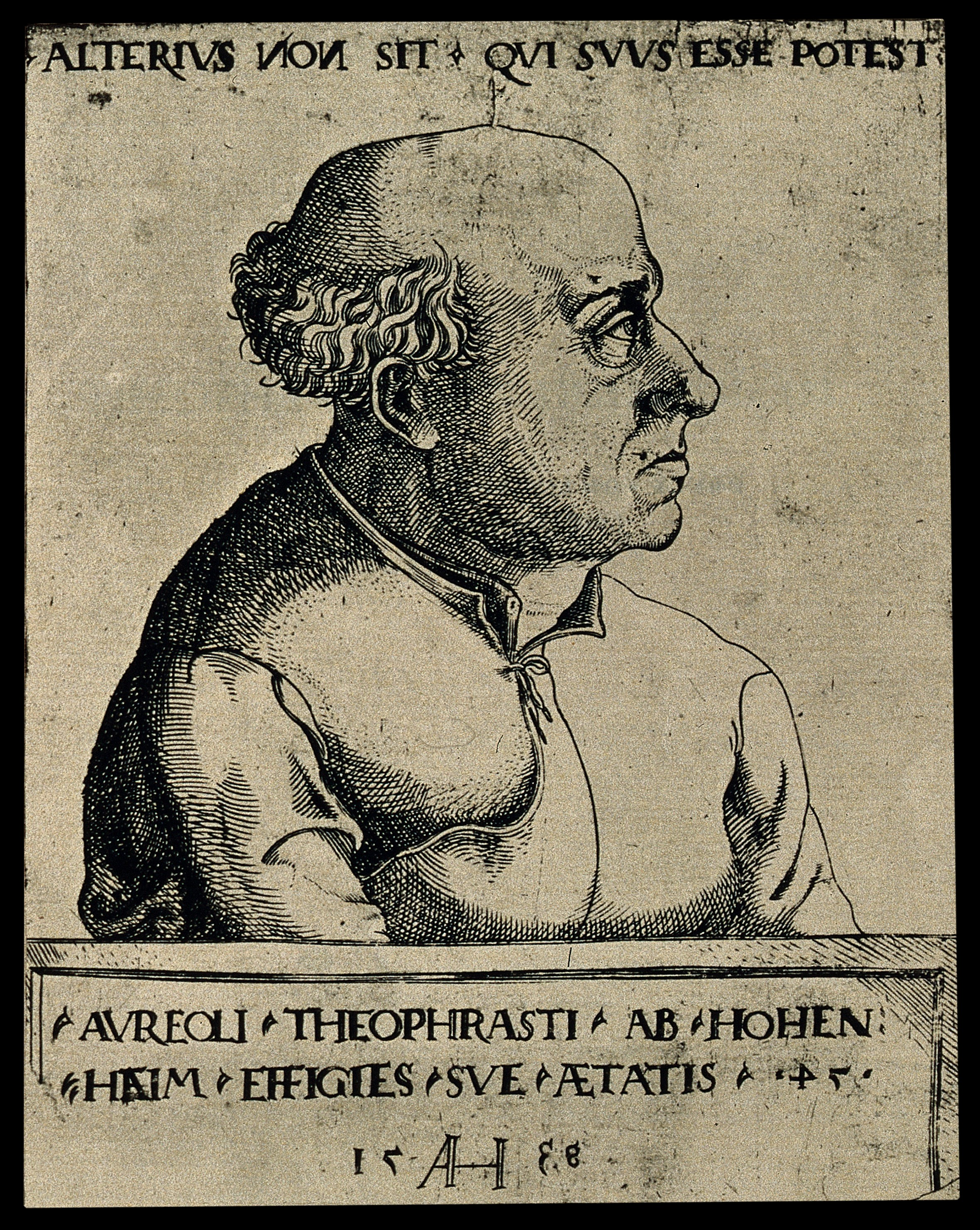
1538 portrait of Paracelsus by Augustin Hirschvogel

==== Paracelsus ====
Paracelsus (c. 1493 (Note: Pagel (1982), p. 6, citing Bittel (1942), p. 1163, Strebel (1944), p. 38. The most frequently cited assumption that Paracelsus was born in late 1493 is due to Sudhoff (1936), p. 11.)–1541) was a Swiss (Note: Paracelsus self-identifies as Swiss (ich bin von Einsidlen, dess Lands ein Schweizer) in grosse Wundartznei (vol. 1, p. 56) and names Carinthia as his "second fatherland" (das ander mein Vatterland).) physician, alchemist, lay theologian, and philosopher of the German Renaissance. As a physician of the early 16th century, Paracelsus held a natural affinity with the Hermetic, Neoplatonic, and Pythagorean philosophies central to the Renaissance, a world-view exemplified by Marsilio Ficino and Pico della Mirandola.

Astrology was a very important part of Paracelsus's medicine and he was a practising astrologer – as were many of the university-trained physicians working at that time in Europe. Paracelsus devoted several sections in his writings to the construction of astrological talismans for curing disease. He largely rejected the philosophies of Aristotle and Galen, as well as the theory of humours. Although he did accept the concept of the four elements as water, air, fire, and earth, he saw them merely as a foundation for other properties on which to build. Paracelsus also described four elemental beings, each corresponding to one of the four elements: Salamanders, which correspond to fire; Gnomes, corresponding to earth; Undines, corresponding to water; and Sylphs, corresponding to air.

He often viewed fire as the Firmament that sat between air and water in the heavens. Paracelsus often uses an egg to help describe the elements. In his early model, he wrote that air surrounded the world like an egg shell. The egg white below the shell is like fire because it has a type of chaos to it that allows it to hold up earth and water. The earth and water make up a globe which, in terms of the egg, is the yolk. In De Meteoris, Paracelsus wrote that the firmament is the heavens.

==== Nostradamus ====
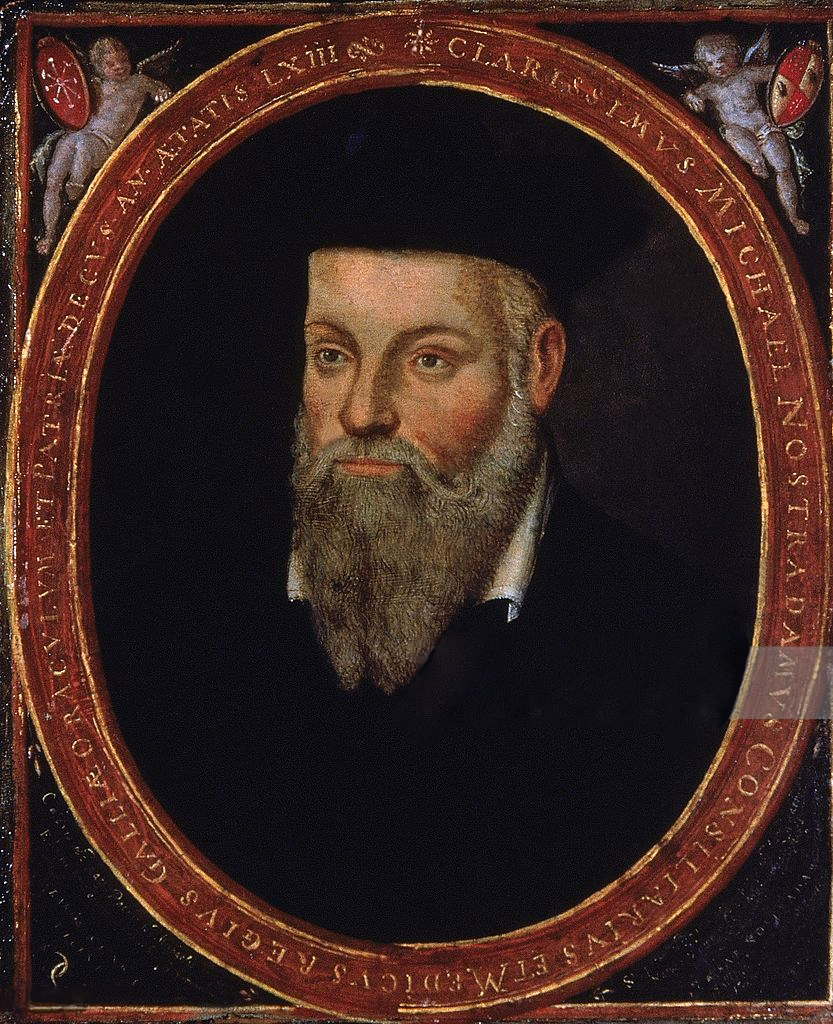
Nostradamus: original portrait by his son Cesar

Nostradamus (1503–1566) was a French astrologer, physician and reputed seer, who is best known for allegedly predicting future events. Following popular trends, he wrote an almanac for 1550, for the first time in print Latinising his name to Nostradamus. He was so encouraged by the almanac's success that he decided to write one or more annually. Taken together, they are known to have contained at least 6,338 prophecies, as well as at least eleven annual calendars, all of them starting on 1 January and not, as is sometimes supposed, in March.

It was mainly in response to the almanacs that the nobility and other prominent persons from far away soon started asking for horoscopes and psychic advice from him, though he generally expected his clients to supply the birth charts on which these would be based, rather than calculating them himself as a professional astrologer would have done. When obliged to attempt this himself on the basis of the published tables of the day, he frequently made errors and failed to adjust the figures for his clients' place or time of birth.

He then began his project of writing his book Les Prophéties, a collection of 942 poetic quatrains (Note: The original edition of Nostradamus's Les Prophéties from 1555 contained only 353 quatrains. More were later added, amounting to 942 in an omnibus edition published after his death organized into ten "Centuries", each one containing one hundred quatrains, except for Century VII, which, for unknown reasons, only contains forty-two; the other fifty-eight may have been lost due to a problem during publication.) which constitute the largely undated prophecies for which he is most famous today. Feeling vulnerable to opposition on religious grounds, however, he devised a method of obscuring his meaning by using "Virgilianised" syntax, word games and a mixture of other languages such as Greek, Italian, Latin, and Provençal. For technical reasons connected with their publication in three instalments (the publisher of the third and last instalment seems to have been unwilling to start it in the middle of a "Century," or book of 100 verses), the last fifty-eight quatrains of the seventh "Century" have not survived in any extant edition.

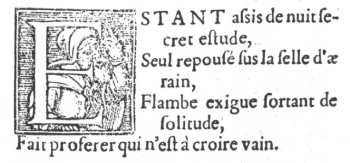
Century I, Quatrain 1 in the 1555 Lyon Bonhomme edition

Les Prophéties received a mixed reaction when it was published. Some people thought Nostradamus was a servant of evil, a fake, or insane, while many of the elite evidently thought otherwise. Catherine de' Medici, wife of King Henry II of France, was one of Nostradamus's greatest admirers. After reading his almanacs for 1555, which hinted at unnamed threats to the royal family, she summoned him to Paris to explain them and to draw up horoscopes for her children. At the time, he feared that he would be beheaded, but by the time of his death in 1566, Queen Catherine had made him Counselor and Physician-in-Ordinary to her son, the young King Charles IX of France.

In the years since the publication of his Les Prophéties, Nostradamus has attracted many supporters, who, along with much of the popular press, credit him with having accurately predicted many major world events. Most academic sources reject the notion that Nostradamus had any genuine supernatural prophetic abilities and maintain that the associations made between world events and Nostradamus's quatrains are the result of misinterpretations or mistranslations (sometimes deliberate). These academics also argue that Nostradamus's predictions are characteristically vague, meaning they could be applied to virtually anything, and are useless for determining whether their author had any real prophetic powers.

==== Johann Weyer ====
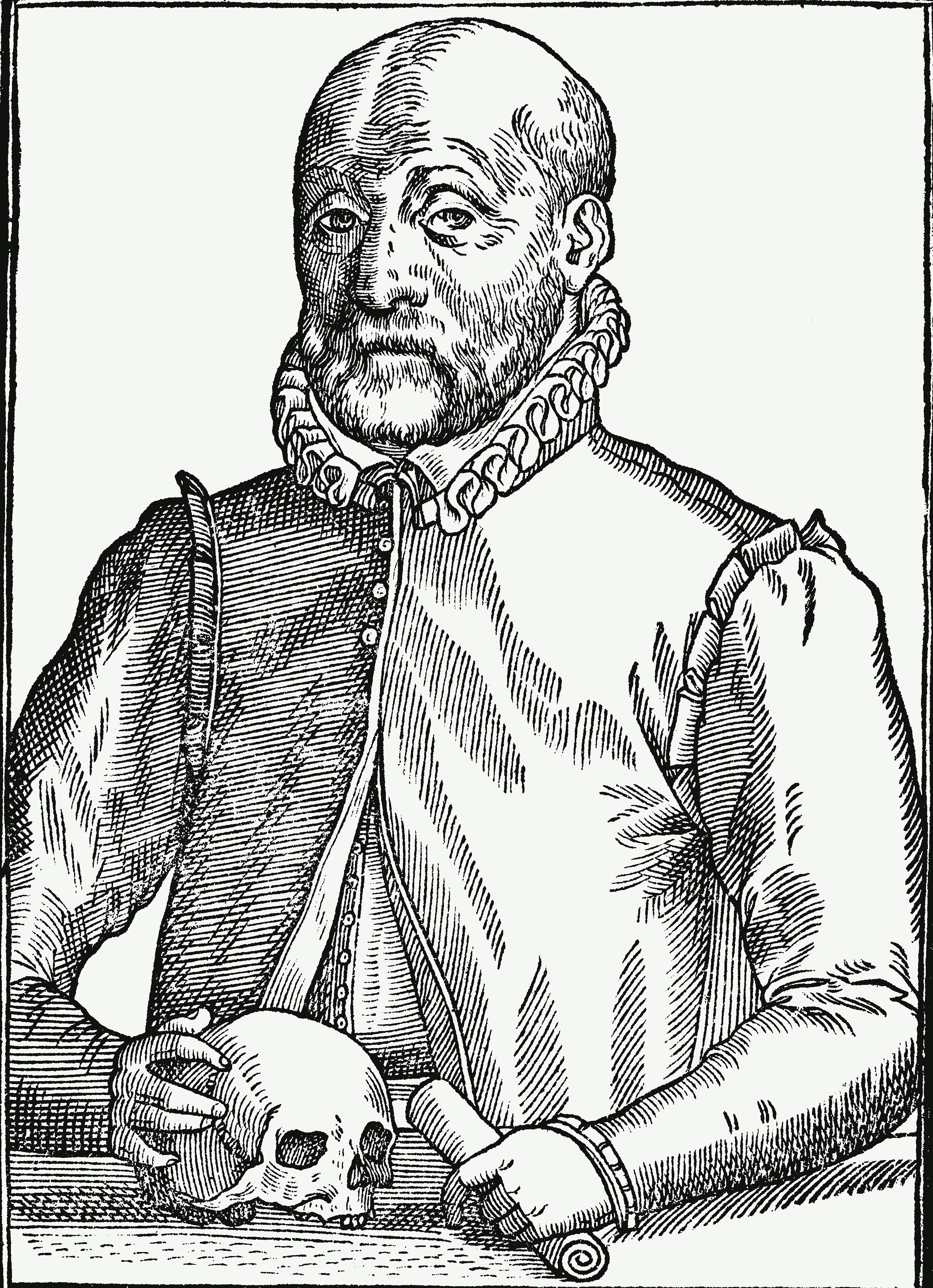
Engraving of Johann Weyer, age 60, from De Lamiis Liber

Johann Weyer (1515–1588) was a Dutch physician, occultist and demonologist, and a disciple and follower of Heinrich Cornelius Agrippa. He was among the first to publish against the persecution of witches. His most influential work is De Praestigiis Daemonum et Incantationibus ac Venificiis ('On the Illusions of the Demons and on Spells and Poisons'; 1563).

Weyer criticised the Malleus Maleficarum and the witch hunting by the Christian and Civil authorities; he is said to have been the first person that used the term mentally ill or melancholy to designate those women accused of practicing witchcraft. In a time when witch trials and executions were just beginning to be common, he sought to derogate the law concerning witchcraft prosecution. He claimed that not only were examples of magic largely incredible but that the crime of witchcraft was literally impossible, so that anyone who confessed to the crime was likely to be suffering some mental disturbance (mainly melancholy, a very flexible category with many different symptoms).

While he defended the idea that the Devil's power was not as strong as claimed by the orthodox Christian churches in De Praestigiis Daemonum, he also defended the idea that demons did have power and could appear before people who called upon them, creating illusions; but he commonly referred to magicians and not to witches when speaking about people who could create illusions, saying they were heretics who were using the Devil's power to do it, and when speaking on witches, he used the term mentally ill.

Moreover, Weyer did not only write the catalogue of demons Pseudomonarchia Daemonum, but also gave their description and the conjurations to invoke them in the appropriate hour and in the name of God and the Trinity, not to create illusions but to oblige them to do the conjurer's will, as well as advice on how to avoid certain perils and tricks if the demon was reluctant to do what he was commanded or a liar. In addition, he wanted to abolish the prosecution of witches, and when speaking on those who invoke demons (which he called spirits) he carefully used the word exorcist.

Weyer never denied the existence of the Devil and a huge number of other demons of high and low order. His work was an inspiration for other occultists and demonologists, including an anonymous author who wrote the Lemegeton (The Lesser Key of Solomon). There were many editions of his books (written in Latin), especially Pseudomonarchia Daemonum, and several adaptations in English, including Reginald Scot's "Discoverie of Witchcraft" (1584).

Weyer's appeal for clemency for those accused of the crime of witchcraft was opposed later in the sixteenth century by the Swiss physician Thomas Erastus, the French legal theorist Jean Bodin and King James VI of Scotland.

==== John Dee and Edward Kelley ====
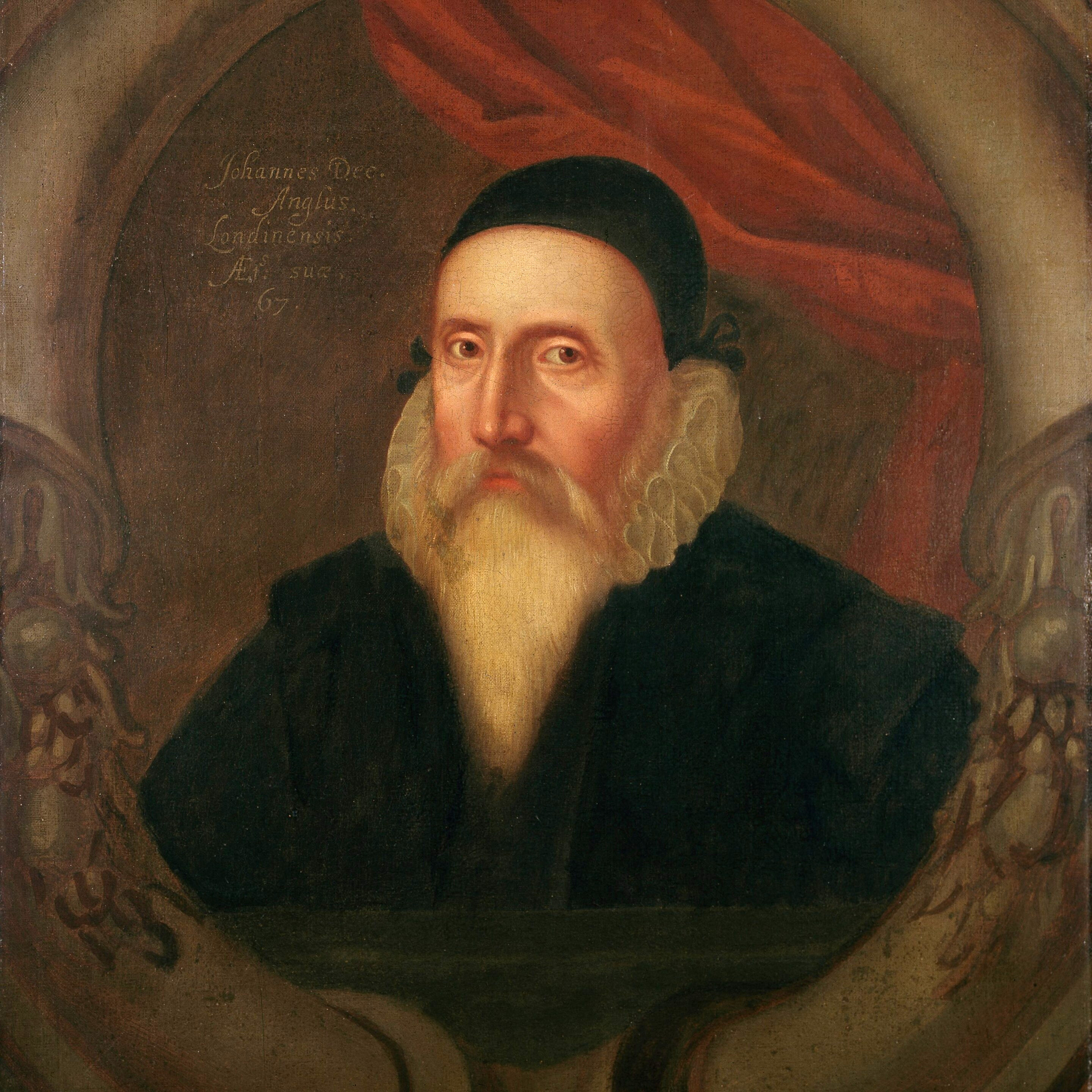
A 16th-century portrait by an unknown artist (Note: According to Fell Smith (1909) it was painted when Dee was 67. It belonged to a grandson, Rowland Dee, and later to Elias Ashmole, who left it to Oxford University.)

John Dee (1527–1608 or 1609) was an English mathematician, astronomer, astrologer, teacher, occultist, and alchemist. He was the court astrologer for, and advisor to, Elizabeth I. A student of the Renaissance Neo-Platonism of Marsilio Ficino, he spent much of his time on alchemy, divination and Hermetic philosophy. As an antiquarian, he had one of the largest libraries in England at the time. As a political advisor, he advocated for the founding of English colonies in the New World to form a "British Empire", a term he is credited with coining.

Dee was an intense Christian, but his religiosity was influenced by Hermetic and Platonic-Pythagorean doctrines pervasive in the Renaissance. He believed that numbers were the basis of all things and key to knowledge. From Hermeticism he drew a belief that man had the potential for divine power that could be exercised through mathematics. His goal was to help bring forth a unified world religion through the healing of the breach of the Roman Catholic and Protestant churches and the recapture of the pure theology of the ancients.

In 1564, Dee wrote the Hermetic work Monas Hieroglyphica ("The Hieroglyphic Monad"), an exhaustive Cabalistic interpretation of a glyph of his own design, meant to express the mystical unity of all creation. Having dedicated it to Maximilian II, Holy Roman Emperor in an effort to gain patronage, Dee attempted to present it to him at the time of his ascension to the throne of Hungary. The work was esteemed by many of Dee's contemporaries, but cannot be interpreted today in the absence of the secret oral tradition of that era.

By the early 1580s, Dee was discontented with his progress in learning the secrets of nature. He subsequently began to turn energetically towards the supernatural as a means to acquire knowledge. He sought to contact spirits through the use of a scryer or crystal-gazer, which he thought would act as an intermediary between himself and the angels.

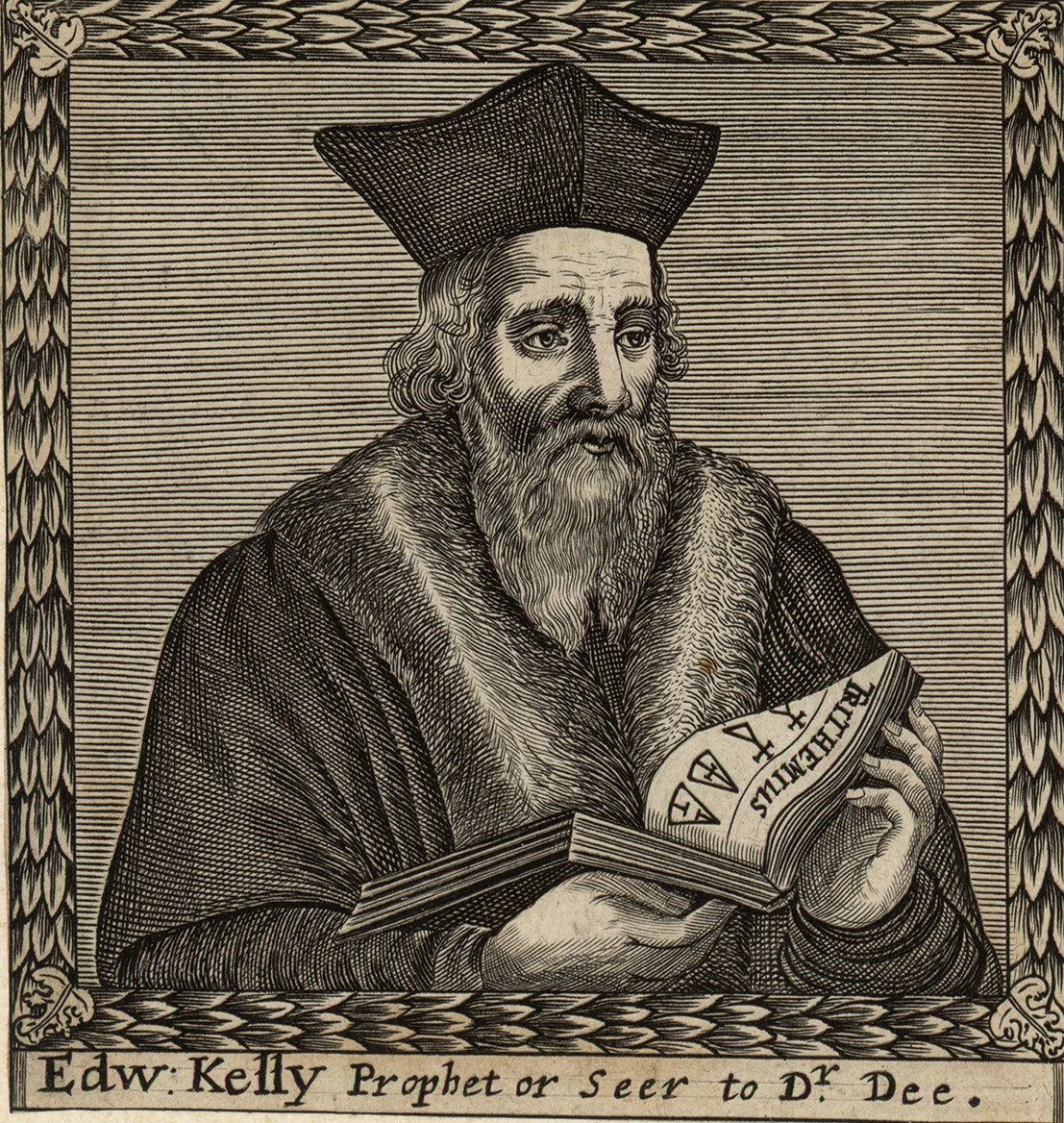
Edward Kelley

Dee's first attempts with several scryers were unsatisfactory, but in 1582 he met Edward Kelley (1555–1597/8), then calling himself Edward Talbot to disguise his conviction for "coining" or forgery, who impressed him greatly with his abilities. Dee took Kelley into his service and began to devote all his energies to his supernatural pursuits. These "spiritual conferences" or "actions" were conducted with intense Christian piety, always after periods of purification, prayer and fasting. Dee was convinced of the benefits they could bring to mankind. The character of Kelley is harder to assess: some conclude that he acted with cynicism, but delusion or self-deception cannot be ruled out. Kelley's "output" is remarkable for its volume, intricacy and vividness. Dee believed that angels laboriously dictated several books to him this way, through Kelley, some in a special angelic or Enochian language.

In 1583, Dee met the impoverished yet popular Polish nobleman Albert Łaski, who, after overstaying his welcome at court, invited Dee to accompany him back to Poland. With some prompting by the "angels" (again through Kelley) and by dint of his worsening status at court, Dee decided to do so. He, Kelley, and their families left in September 1583, but Łaski proved to be bankrupt and out of favour in his own country. Dee and Kelley began a nomadic life in Central Europe, meanwhile continuing their spiritual conferences, which Dee detailed in his diaries and almanacs. They had audiences with Emperor Rudolf II in Prague Castle and King Stephen Bathory of Poland, whom they attempted to convince of the importance of angelic communication.

In 1587, at a spiritual conference in Bohemia, Kelley told Dee that the angel Uriel had ordered the men to share all their possessions, including their wives. By this time, Kelley had gained some renown as an alchemist and was more sought-after than Dee in this regard: it was a line of work that had prospects for serious and long-term financial gain, especially among the royal families of central Europe. Dee, however, was more interested in communicating with angels, who he believed would help him solve the mysteries of the heavens through mathematics, optics, astrology, science and navigation. Perhaps Kelley in fact wished to end Dee's dependence on him as a diviner at their increasingly lengthy, frequent spiritual conferences. The order for wife-sharing caused Dee anguish, but he apparently did not doubt it was genuine and they apparently shared wives. However, Dee broke off the conferences immediately afterwards. He returned to England in 1589, while Kelley went on to be the alchemist to Emperor Rudolf II.

By 1590 Kelley was living an opulent lifestyle in Europe, enjoying the patronage of nobility: he received several estates and large sums of money from Rosenberg. Meanwhile, he continued his alchemical experiments until he had convinced Rudolf II that he was ready to start producing gold, the purpose of his work. Rudolf knighted him Sir Edward Kelley of Imany and New Lüben on 23 February 1590 (but it is possible that this happened in 1589). In May 1591, Rudolf had Kelley arrested and imprisoned in the Křivoklát Castle outside Prague, supposedly for killing an official named Jiri Hunkler in a duel; it is possible that he also did not want Kelley to escape before he had actually produced any gold. In 1595, Kelly agreed to co-operate and return to his alchemical work; he was released and restored to his former status. When he failed to produce any gold, he was again imprisoned, this time in Hněvín Castle in Most. His wife and stepdaughter attempted to hire an imperial counselor who might free Kelley from imprisonment, but he died a prisoner in late 1597/early 1598 of injuries received while attempting to escape.

A few of Kelley's writings are extant today, including two alchemical verse treatises in English, and three other treatises, which he dedicated to Rudolf II from prison. They were entitled Tractatus duo egregii de lapide philosophorum una cum theatro astronomiae (1676). The treatises have been translated as The Alchemical Writings of Edward Kelley (1893).

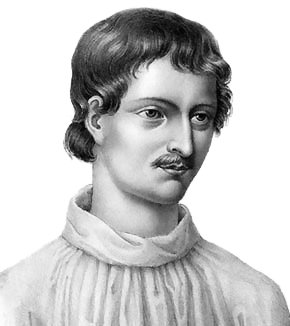
Modern portrait of Giordano Bruno based on a woodcut from Livre du recteur, 1578

==== Giordano Bruno ====
Giordano Bruno (1548–1600) was an Italian Dominican friar, philosopher, mathematician, poet, cosmological theorist, and Hermetic occultist. He is known for his cosmological theories, which conceptually extended the then-novel Copernican model. He proposed that the stars were distant suns surrounded by their own planets, and he raised the possibility that these planets might foster life of their own, a cosmological position known as cosmic pluralism. He also insisted that the universe is infinite and could have no "center".

In addition to cosmology, Bruno also wrote extensively on the art of memory, a loosely organized group of mnemonic techniques and principles. Historian Frances Yates argues that Bruno was deeply influenced by Islamic astrology (particularly the philosophy of Averroes), Neoplatonism, Renaissance Hermeticism, and Genesis-like legends surrounding the Egyptian god Thoth. (Note: The primary work on the relationship between Bruno and Hermeticism is Yates (1964); for an alternative assessment, placing more emphasis on the Kabbalah, and less on Hermeticism, see De León-Jones (1997); for a return to emphasis on Bruno's role in the development of Science, and criticism of Yates' emphasis on magical and Hermetic themes, see Gatti (2002).) Other studies of Bruno have focused on his qualitative approach to mathematics and his application of the spatial concepts of geometry to language.

In 1584, Bruno published two important philosophical dialogues (La Cena de le Ceneri and De l'infinito universo et mondi) in which he argued against the planetary spheres (Christoph Rothmann did the same in 1586 as did Tycho Brahe in 1587) and affirmed the Copernican principle. In particular, to support the Copernican view and oppose the objection according to which the motion of the Earth would be perceived by means of the motion of winds, clouds etc., in La Cena de le Ceneri Bruno anticipates some of the arguments of Galilei on the relativity principle.

Bruno's cosmology distinguishes between "suns" which produce their own light and heat, and have other bodies moving around them; and "earths" which move around suns and receive light and heat from them. Bruno suggested that some, if not all, of the objects classically known as fixed stars are in fact suns. According to astrophysicist Steven Soter, he was the first person to grasp that "stars are other suns with their own planets." Bruno wrote that other worlds "have no less virtue nor a nature different from that of our Earth" and, like Earth, "contain animals and inhabitants".

In 1588, he went to Prague, where he obtained 300 taler from Rudolf II, but no teaching position. He went on to serve briefly as a professor in Helmstedt, but had to flee when he was excommunicated by the Lutherans. During this period he produced several Latin works, dictated to his friend and secretary Girolamo Besler, including De Magia (On Magic), Theses De Magia (Theses on Magic) and De Vinculis in Genere (A General Account of Bonding). All these were apparently transcribed or recorded by Besler (or Bisler) between 1589 and 1590. He also published De Imaginum, Signorum, Et Idearum Compositione (On the Composition of Images, Signs and Ideas, 1591).

Starting in 1593, Bruno was tried for heresy by the Roman Inquisition on charges of denial of several core Catholic doctrines, including eternal damnation, the Trinity, the divinity of Christ, the virginity of Mary, and transubstantiation. Bruno's pantheism was not taken lightly by the church, (Note: Birx (1997): "Bruno was burned to death at the stake for his pantheistic stance and cosmic perspective.") nor was his teaching of the transmigration of the soul (reincarnation). The Inquisition found him guilty, and he was burned at the stake in Rome's Campo de' Fiori in 1600. After his death, he gained considerable fame, being particularly celebrated by 19th- and early 20th-century commentators who regarded him as a martyr for science, although most historians agree that his heresy trial was not a response to his cosmological views but rather a response to his religious and afterlife views. (Note: Crowe (1986), p. 10: "[Bruno's] sources... seem to have been more numerous than his followers, at least until the eighteenth- and nineteenth-century revival of interest in Bruno as a supposed 'martyr for science.' It is true that he was burned at the stake in Rome in 1600, but the church authorities guilty of this action were almost certainly more distressed at his denial of Christ's divinity and alleged diabolism than at his cosmological doctrines.") (Note: Frank (2009), p. 24: "Though Bruno may have been a brilliant thinker whose work stands as a bridge between ancient and modern thought, his persecution cannot be seen solely in light of the war between science and religion.") (Note: White (2002), p. 7: "This was perhaps the most dangerous notion of all... If other worlds existed with intelligent beings living there, did they too have their visitations? The idea was quite unthinkable.") (Note: Shackelford (2009), p. 66: "Yet the fact remains that cosmological matters, notably the plurality of worlds, were an identifiable concern all along and appear in the summary document: Bruno was repeatedly questioned on these matters, and he apparently refused to recant them at the end.14 So, Bruno probably was burned alive for resolutely maintaining a series of heresies, among which his teaching of the plurality of worlds was prominent but by no means singular.") However some historians do contend that the main reason for Bruno's death was indeed his cosmological views. Bruno's case is still considered a landmark in the history of free thought and the emerging sciences. (Note: Gatti (2002), pp. 18–19: "For Bruno was claiming for the philosopher a principle of free thought and inquiry which implied an entirely new concept of authority: that of the individual intellect in its serious and continuing pursuit of an autonomous inquiry… It is impossible to understand the issue involved and to evaluate justly the stand made by Bruno with his life without appreciating the question of free thought and liberty of expression. His insistence on placing this issue at the center of both his work and of his defense is why Bruno remains so much a figure of the modern world. If there is, as many have argued, an intrinsic link between science and liberty of inquiry, then Bruno was among those who guaranteed the future of the newly emerging sciences, as well as claiming in wider terms a general principle of free thought and expression.") (Note: Montano (2007), p. 71: "In Rome, Bruno was imprisoned for seven years and subjected to a difficult trial that analyzed, minutely, all his philosophical ideas. Bruno, who in Venice had been willing to recant some theses, became increasingly resolute and declared on 21 December 1599 that he 'did not wish to repent of having too little to repent, and in fact did not know what to repent.' Declared an unrepentant heretic and excommunicated, he was burned alive in the Campo dei Fiori in Rome on Ash Wednesday, 17 February 1600. On the stake, along with Bruno, burned the hopes of many, including philosophers and scientists of good faith like Galileo, who thought they could reconcile religious faith and scientific research, while belonging to an ecclesiastical organization declaring itself to be the custodian of absolute truth and maintaining a cultural militancy requiring continual commitment and suspicion.")

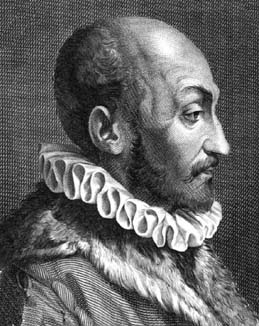
Portrait of della Porta from Jo. Bapt. Portae Neapolitani Magiae naturalis libri XX, Naples, 1589

==== Giambattista della Porta ====
Giambattista della Porta (1535-1615) was an Italian scholar, polymath and playwright who lived in Naples at the time of the Scientific Revolution and Reformation. His most famous work, first published in 1558, is entitled Magia Naturalis (Natural Magic). In this book he covered a variety of the subjects he had investigated, including optics, occult philosophy, astrology, alchemy, mathematics, meteorology, and natural philosophy. He was also referred to as "professor of secrets".

In Natural Magic, della Porta describes an imaginary device known as a sympathetic telegraph. The device consisted of two circular boxes, similar to compasses, each with a magnetic needle, supposed to be magnetized by the same lodestone. Each box was to be labeled with the 26 letters, instead of the usual directions. Della Porta assumed that this would coordinate the needles such that when a letter was dialed in one box, the needle in the other box would swing to point to the same letter, thereby helping in communicating.

In 1563, della Porta published De Furtivis Literarum Notis, a work about cryptography. In it he described the first known digraphic substitution cipher. Charles J. Mendelsohn commented:

He was, in my opinion, the outstanding cryptographer of the Renaissance. Some unknown who worked in a hidden room behind closed doors may possibly have surpassed him in general grasp of the subject, but among those whose work can be studied he towers like a giant.

Della Porta invented a method which allowed him to write secret messages on the inside of eggs. During the Spanish Inquisition, some of his friends were imprisoned. At the gate of the prison, everything was checked except for eggs. Della Porta wrote messages on the egg shell using a mixture made of plant pigments and alum. The ink penetrated the egg shell which is semi-porous. When the egg shell was dry, he boiled the egg in hot water and the ink on the outside of the egg was washed away. When the recipient in prison peeled off the shell, the message was revealed once again on the egg white.

Della Porta was the founder of a scientific society called the Academia Secretorum Naturae (Accademia dei Segreti). This group was more commonly known as the Otiosi, (Men of Leisure). Founded sometime before 1580, the Otiosi were one of the first scientific societies in Europe and their aim was to study the "secrets of nature." Any person applying for membership had to demonstrate they had made a new discovery in the natural sciences.

The Academia Secretorum Naturae was compelled to disband when its members were suspected of dealing with the occult. A Catholic, della Porta was examined by the Inquisition and summoned to Rome by Pope Gregory XIII. Though he personally emerged from the meeting unscathed, he was forced to disband his Academia Secretorum Naturae, and in 1592 his philosophical works were prohibited from further publication by the Church. The ban was lifted in 1598.

Despite this incident, della Porta remained religiously devout and became a lay Jesuit brother. Porta's involvement with the Inquisition puzzles historians due his active participation in charitable Jesuit works by 1585. A possible explanation for this lies in Porta's personal relations with Fra Paolo Sarpi after 1579.

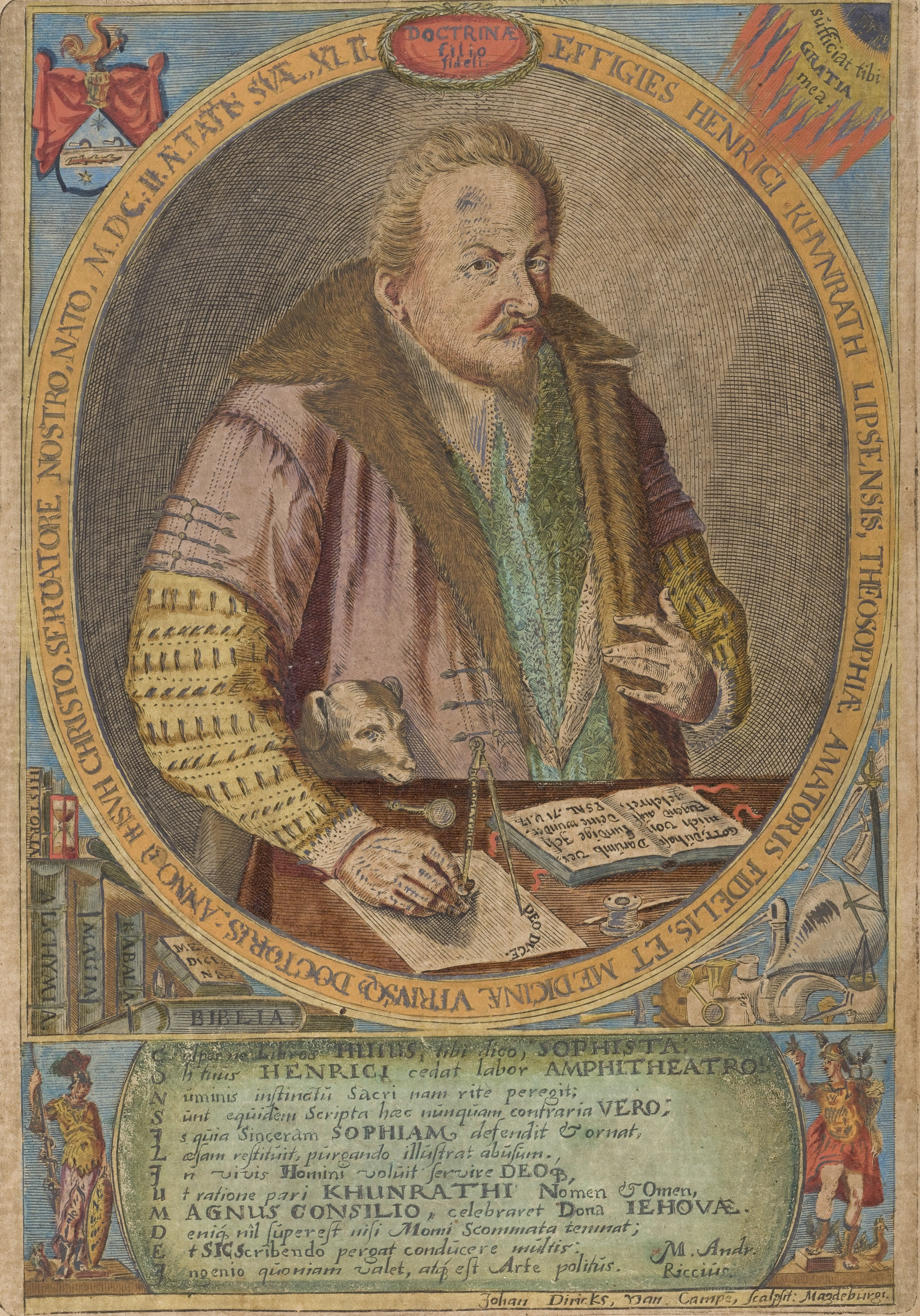
Portrait of Heinrich Khunrath from his Amphitheatrum sapientiae aeternae

==== Heinrich Khunrath ====
Heinrich Khunrath (c. 1560–1605) was a German physician, hermetic philosopher, and alchemist. Frances Yates considered him to be a link between the philosophy of John Dee and Rosicrucianism. His name, in the spelling "Henricus Künraht" was used as a pseudonym for the 1670 publisher of the Tractatus Theologico-Politicus of Baruch Spinoza.

Khunrath, a disciple of Paracelsus, practiced medicine in Dresden, Magdeburg, and Hamburg and may have held a professorial position in Leipzig. He travelled widely after 1588, including a stay at the Imperial court in Prague, home to the mystically inclined Habsburg emperor Rudolf II. Before reaching Prague he had met John Dee at Bremen on 27 May 1589, when Dee was on his way back to England from Bohemia. Khunrath praised Dee in his later works. During his court stay Khunrath met the alchemist Edward Kelley who had remained behind after he and Dee had parted company. In September 1591, Khunrath was appointed court physician to Count Rosemberk in Trebona. He probably met Johann Thölde while at Trebona, one of the suggested authors of the "Basilius Valentinus" treatises on alchemy.

Khunrath's brushes with John Dee and Thölde and Paracelsian beliefs led him to develop a Christianized natural magic, seeking to find the secret prima materia that would lead man into eternal wisdom. The Christianized view that Khunrath took was framed around his commitment to Lutheran theology. He also held that experience and observation were essential to practical alchemical research, as would a natural philosopher.

His most famous work on alchemy is the Amphitheatrum Sapientiae Aeternae (Amphitheater of Eternal Wisdom), a work on the mystical aspects of that art, which contains the oft-seen engraving entitled "The First Stage of the Great Work", better-known as the "Alchemist's Laboratory". The book was first published at Hamburg in 1595, with four circular elaborate, hand-colored, engraved plates heightened with gold and silver which Khunrath designed and were engraved by Paullus van der Doort. The book was then made more widely available in an expanded edition with the addition of other plates published posthumously in Hanau in 1609.

Amphitheatrum Sapientiae Aeternae is an alchemical classic, combining both Christianity and magic. In it, Khunrath showed himself to be an adept of spiritual alchemy and illustrated the many-staged and intricate path to spiritual perfection. Khunrath's work was important in Lutheran circles. John Warwick Montgomery has pointed out that Johann Arndt (1555–1621), who was the influential writer of Lutheran books of pietiesm and devotion, composed a commentary on Amphitheatrum. Some of the ideas in his works are Kabbalistic in nature and foreshadow Rosicrucianism.

==== Other Renaissance writers ====
Other writers on occult or magical topics during this period include:

- Thomas Charnock (1524–1581) was an English alchemist and occultist who devoted his life to the quest for the Philosopher's Stone.
- Nicolas Flamel (1330–1418) was a French scribe and manuscript-seller. After his death, Flamel developed a reputation as an alchemist believed to have discovered the philosopher's stone and to have thereby achieved immortality. These legendary accounts first appeared in the late 16th century. Several late 16th- to early 17th-century works are attributed to Flamel.
- Basil Valentine (pseudonym for one or more 16th-century authors) known especially for The Twelve Keys of Basil Valentine (1599).

== See also ==
- Astral theology
- Baroque magic
- Body of light
- The Book of Abramelin
- Ceremonial magic
- Character (symbol)
- Continuity thesis
- History of magic
- Jewish views on astrology
- Magical formula
- Magical Treatise of Solomon
- Medieval European magic
- Renaissance technology
- Science in the Renaissance
- Western esotericism
