= Heidelberger Schicksalsbuch =

1490 mss on topics of astrology and magic

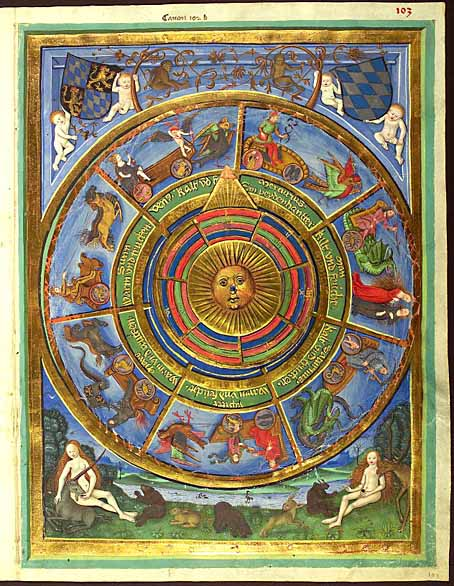
fol. 103r, the astrolabe of Berthold Furtmeyr.

The Heidelberger Schicksalsbuch is a parchment manuscript, completed in the 1490s in Regensburg, kept in Heidelberg University library as Cod. Pal. germ. 832. On 271 folia it treats topics of astrology and magic. A functional paper astrolabe is inserted on fol. 103 and into the back cover.

contents:

1v-27r astrological calendar of Regiomontanus
28r-33r glosses on the calendar and the use of the following Astrolabium planum
36r-83v Johannes Angelus, after Pietro d'Abano, Astrolabium planum
84r-92r on the 36 constellations of Michael Scotus
92v-98r on the signs of the zodiac
98v-101v on the planets and their children
102
102rv glosses on planetary hours, instructions on using the following astrolabe
103r Berthold Furtmeyr, astrolabe
104r-105v the four complexions
106r-108r the four elements
108v schema of winds
110r-116r book on dreams
118v-119r illustration of two instruments of Regiomontanus; calendarium
120r-125v "sand art of the 16 judges"
127r-129r astrology of Guido Bonatti
130r-135v onomancy of Johannes Hartlieb
137r-233v geomancy
244r-248r astrological hunting treatise; planetary hours
248r-259r lunar divination with 28 mansions; description of a calendar; horoscope
259v-271v on prognostics
