= Artes prohibitae =

Types of magic

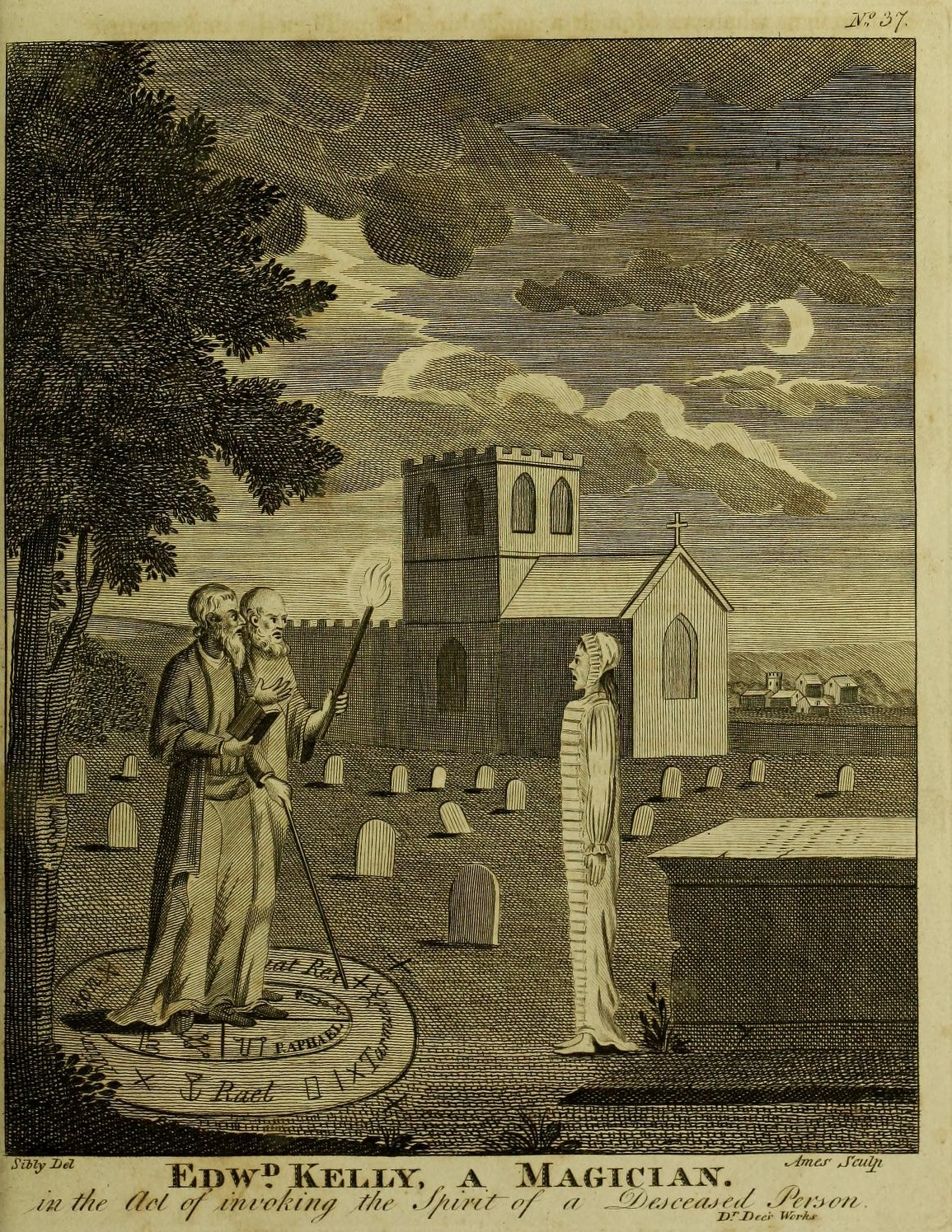
John Dee and Edward Kelley using a magic circle ritual to invoke a spirit in a church graveyard

The seven artes prohibitae, or artes magicae, are arts prohibited by canon law as expounded by Johannes Hartlieb in 1456. They were divided into seven types reflecting that of the artes liberales and artes mechanicae.

The categories were nigromancy, geomancy, hydromancy, aeromancy, pyromancy, chiromancy, and scapulimancy. The division between the four elemental disciplines (viz., geomancy, hydromancy, aeromancy, pyromancy) is somewhat contrived. Chiromancy is the divination from a subject's palms as practiced by the Romani (at the time recently arrived in Europe), and scapulimancy is the divination from animal bones, in particular shoulder blades, as practiced in peasant superstition. Nigromancy is distinguished from scholarly high magic derived from High Medieval grimoires such as the Picatrix, Liber Juratus Honorii, and Liber Razielis Archangeli.

== Categories of artes prohibitae ==
=== Nigromancy ===
While the term "nigromancy" broadly construed includes the six associated divinatory practices, it more specifically refers to the demonic magic of the Late Middle Ages. Demonic magic was performed in groups surrounding a leader in possession of a grimoire. Practitioners were typically members of the educated elite, as most grimoires were written in Latin. One such case in 1444, Inquisitor Gaspare Sighicelli took action against a group active in Bologna. Marco Mattei of Gesso and friar Jacopo of Viterbo confessed to taking part in magical practices. Nigromancy may include, but is not a synonym for, necromancy ("death magic").

=== Geomancy ===
The art of geomancy was one of the more popular forms of divination practiced during the Renaissance. It is a form of divination in which any question may be answered by casting sand, stone, or dirt on the ground and reading the shapes, using tables of geomantic figures for interpretation.

=== Hydromancy ===
Hydromancy, a form of divination using water, is typically used with scrying. Water is used as a medium for scrying to allow the practitioner to see illusionary pictures within it. Hydromancy originated from Babylonia and was popular during Byzantine times whereas in medieval Europe, it was associated with witchcraft.

=== Aeromancy ===
Aeromancy divination consisted in tossing sand, dirt, or seeds into the air and studying and interpreting the patterns of the dust cloud or the settling of the seeds. This also includes divination coming from thunder, comets, falling stars, and the shape of clouds.

=== Pyromancy ===
Pyromancy is the art of divination which consisted of signs and patterns from flames. There are many variations of pyromancy depending on the material thrown into a fire and it is thought to be used for sacrifices to the gods and that the deity is present within the flames with priests interpreting the omens conveyed.

=== Chiromancy ===
Chiromancy is a form of divination based on reading palms and based on intuitions and symbolism with some symbols tying into astrology. A line from a person's hand that resembles a square is considered a bad omen whereas a triangle would be a good omen. This idea comes from the trine and square aspect in the astrological aspects.

=== Scapulimancy ===
Scapulimancy was a form of divination using an animal's scapula. The scapula would be broken and based on how it was broken, it could be used to read the future. It was generally broken by heating it with hot coals until it broke.
