= Ars Magica (novel) =

Ars Magica is the second novel of Spanish author Nerea Riesco, first published on May fourth 2007. Its rights are sold for translation in Italian, German, Polish, Portuguese, Russian and Romanian.

== Synopsis ==
Spain, early 17th century. A woman is found lifeless in Santesteban. All signs point to a murder committed by the Devil and his followers. The region is being scourged for months by the sorcerers, even though the prior year eleven people were burned alive in a sorcery trial. The people are scared. To appease them the Santo Oficio decides to promote a grace edict to forgive those who admit their agreements with the Devil. The severe inquisitor Alonso de Salazar y Frías is tasked with enforcing the edict by covering the region. But what nobody knows is that Salazar doesn't believe anymore in sorcery or spells and, even worse, he does not believe in the Devil anymore, because he has lost his faith. To reveal the mystery of the witches, Salazar will use the anatomy studies from Leonardo da Vinci, forensic technics he learned in Rome, apothecary knowledge to analyse magical ointments... he finally will base his investigation on verifiable facts to establish factual truths instead of suppositions.

Meanwhile, a young woman called Mayo from Labastide-d'Armagnac, who was, following her birth statements, the bastard daughter of the Devil and a mortal woman, travels selling spells. Mayo lost her female companion because this one was arrested during the last auto-da-fé, even if she wasn't condemned. To find her, Mayo decides to follow the steps of Salazar, whom she protects with her spells, even if he does not suspect anything about her beneficial actions.

During their journey, both will face the diabolical powers which will obstruct their plans, the lack of faith and the death of those they love.

== The spells ==
Every chapter's title in the novel refers to a spell or magical formula conceived to resolve a particular problem. Reading the book the reader progressively discovers love potions, invisibility techniques, solutions to lose the vellus hair, recipes to temporarily transform into animal shapes... all the remedies appearing in Ars Magica are a part of the Spanish lore, transmitted generation after generation, and draw their origins deep back in time. The spells and ritual magic were really used at that time, and nowadays some people still use them, even if they ignore their origin. Ars Magica ("the art of magic" in Latin) is then not only a novel but also a book of spells.

== The actual story ==
In marked contrast to what happened in the rest of Europe, in Spain the Inquisition didn't show a particular interest on persecuting witchcraft. Nevertheless, on November the 6th 1610 was celebrated in Logroño what was called the auto de fé de las brujas ("the witches' auto-da-fé"), where eleven people in the Navarre region were condemned to burn. But this auto-da-fé wasn't enough to appease the people's fears, who pretended to continue suffering about the Devil deeds.

One of the inquisitors in charge of the case, Alonso de Salazar y Frías, was sent to the region a year after that auto-da-fé with the intention to promulgate a grace edict which forgave the devil followers if they admitted their guilt.

Salazar interrogated, investigated and compiled information about the sect. This information (for which he was later called "the witches' advocate") denied all what to the moment was thought about sorcerers, to the point that he even said there weren't sorcerers or bewitched until it was talked or written about them.

The resulting file of his investigations took more than 5,000 sheets of paper, all of them bound in eight volumes which, incomprehensibly, never were published. So, this way, the innovative Salazar was almost forgotten for historical record. The documentation was put aside in a basement until it was discovered by American historian Henry Charles Lea. He mentioned then this documentation on his 1906 work about the Spanish Inquisition. Salazar became worldwide famous and in 1941 the Englishman Charles Williams dedicated his book Witchcraft to Salazar (to the immortal memory of Alonso de Salazar y Frías).

== The witches ==
The Pope Gregory IX founded the inquisition courts in 1231. Dominicans and Franciscans were in charge of the organisation, conceived to maintain under control those who refused to live under the Catholic Church's rule.

Unlike in other countries the Spanish Inquisition wasn't submitted to the direct authority of Rome. Rather than that it was ruled by a general inquisitor, designated by the King of Spain. This way the Spanish Inquisition became one of the organs of the state, serving it, and the clerics who directed this organ were also public servants. So the Spanish Inquisition didn't apply punishments, but decided about the punishment that the regular civil authority usually had to apply.
