= Johannes Hartlieb =

German physician

Johannes Hartlieb (c. 1410 – 18 May 1468) was a physician of Late Medieval Bavaria, probably of a family from Neuburg an der Donau. He was in the employment of Louis VII of Bavaria and Albert VI of Austria in the 1430s, and of Albert III of Bavaria from 1440, and of the latter's son Sigismund from 1456. In 1444, he married Sibilla, possibly the daughter of Albert and Agnes Bernauer. Hartlieb wrote a compendium on herbs in ca. 1440, and in 1456 the puch aller verpoten kunst, ungelaubens und der zaubrey (book on all forbidden arts, superstition and sorcery) on the artes magicae, containing the oldest known description of witches' flying ointment. Hartlieb also produced German translations of various classical and medieval authors (Trotula, Macrobius, Gilbertinus, Muscio).

== Works ==
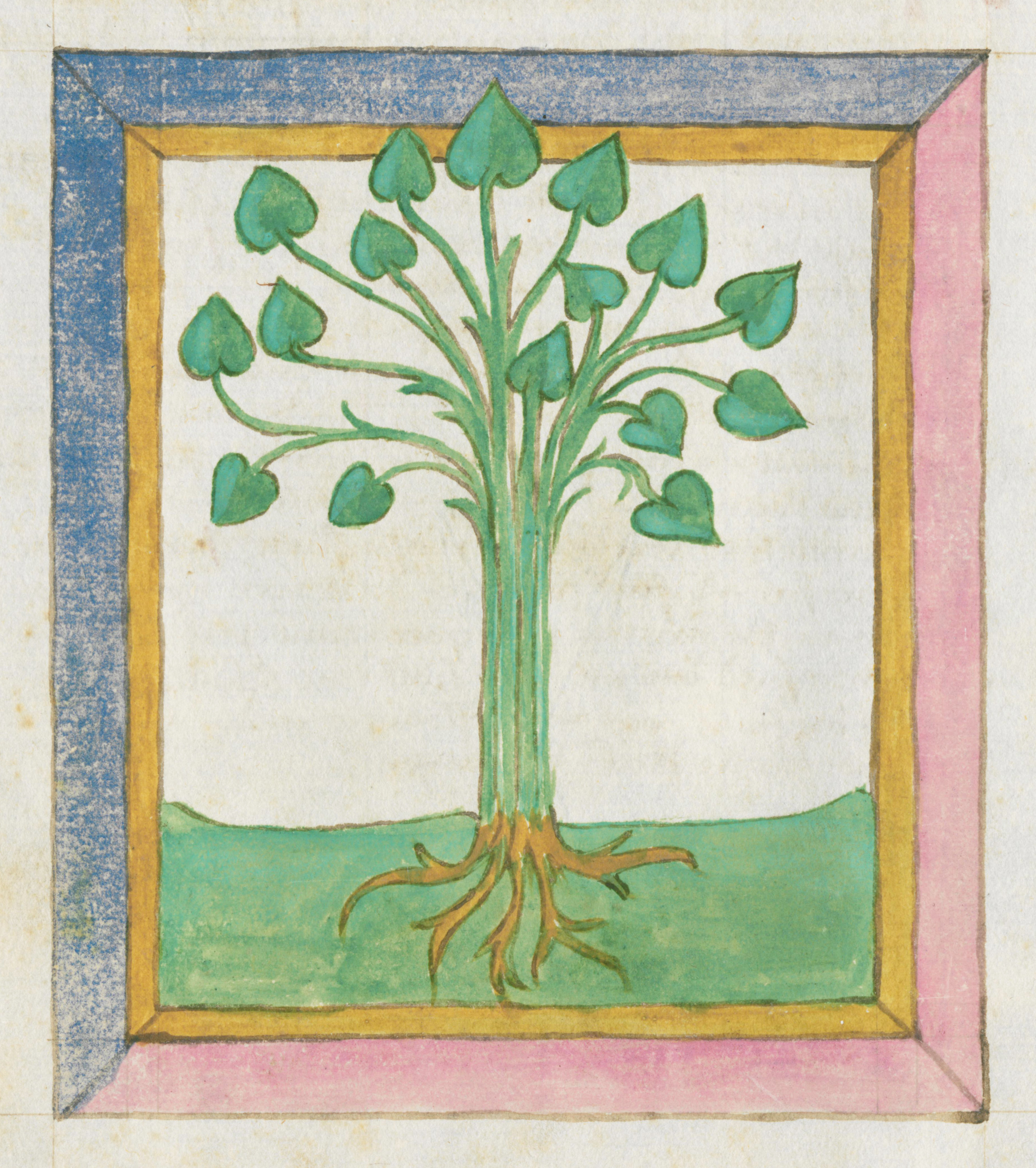
A drawing of a marshmallow plant from Johannes Hartlieb's Book of Herbs.

- onomancy (18 mss., Heidelberger Schicksalsbuch CPG 832, CPG 408)
- das puch aller verpoten kunst, ungelaubens und der zaubrey, 1450s, CPG 478, 78 foll. (in the hand of Clara Hätzlerin), 1465, ed. Eisermann and Graf (1989).
- Kräuterbuch (herbology), ed. Speta, Graz (1980).
- Chiromantia, 1448, printed as a Woodblock print in the 1470s, ed. Weil, München (1923).
- translation of Trotula and de secretis mulierum, 1450s, CPG 480 ed. Bosselmann, Würzburg (1985).
- translation of Caesarius von Heisterbach's dialogus miraculorum, ed. 1929.
- sand Brandons buch (the journey of Saint Brendan), printed by Anton Sorg, Augsburg, ca. 1480.
- 'de amore' deutsch, translation of Andreas Capellanus' de amore, ed. Karnein, München (1970), Berlin (1979).
- Histori von dem Grossen Alexander, translation of the Historia de preliis, 1444, printed by Anton Sorg, Augsburg (1480), Martin Schott, Strassburg (1488).
- De mansionibus, CPG 6
