= Aeromancy =

Divination that is conducted by interpreting atmospheric conditions

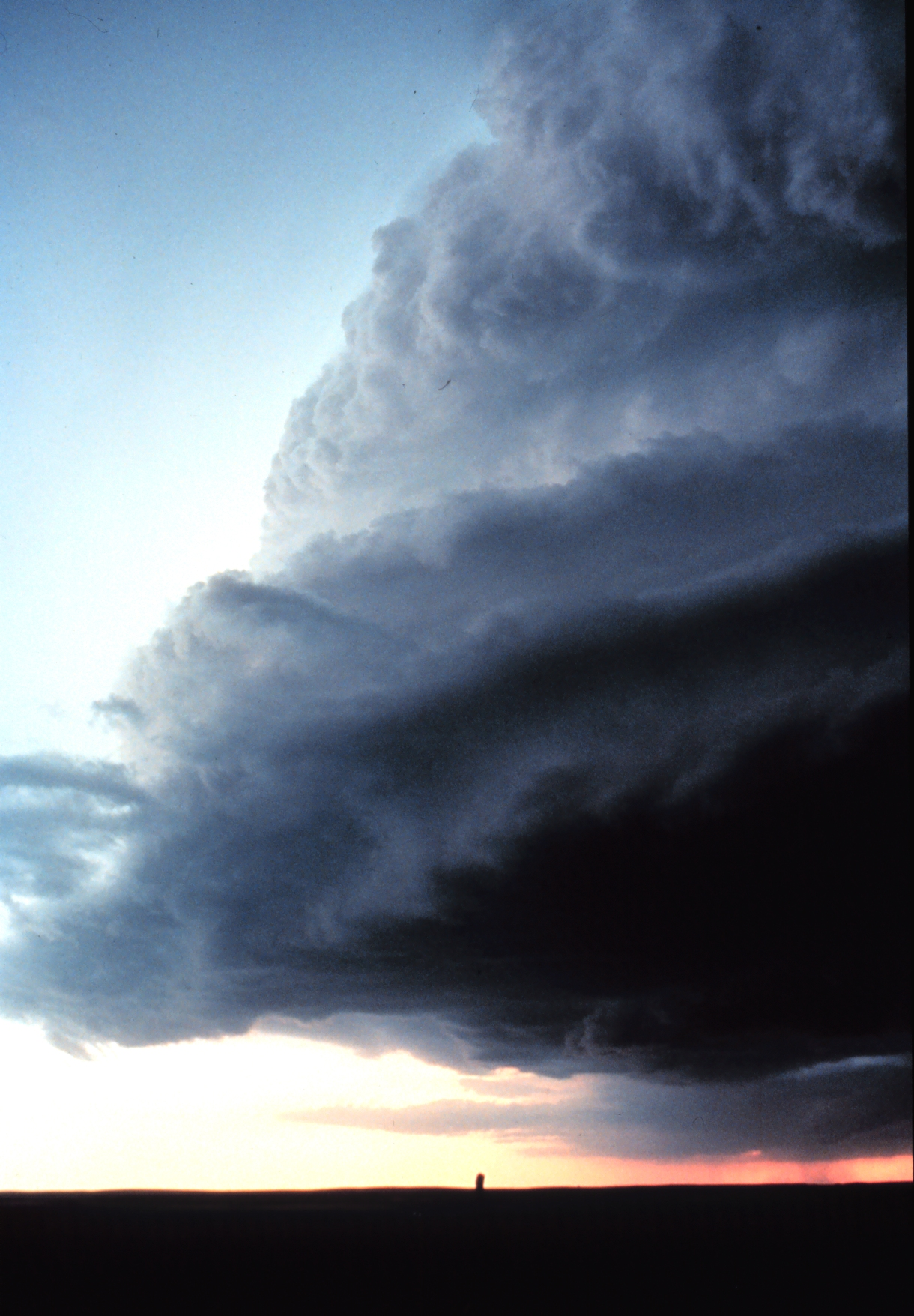
An approaching thunderstorm

Aeromancy (from Greek ἀήρ aḗr, "air", and manteia, "divination") is divination that is conducted by interpreting atmospheric conditions. Alternate terms include "arologie", "aeriology", and "aërology".

== Practice ==
Aeromancy uses cloud formations, wind currents, and cosmological events such as comets, to attempt to divine the past, present, or future. There are sub-types of this practice which are as follows: austromancy (wind divination), ceraunoscopy (observing thunder and lightning), chaomancy (aerial vision), meteormancy (meteors, AKA shooting stars), and nephomancy (cloud divination).

== History ==
Variations on the concept have been used throughout history, the practice is thought to have been used by the ancient Babylonian priests, and is probably alluded to in the bible.

Damascius, the last of the Neoplatonists, records an account of nephomancy in the 5th century CE, during the reign of Leo I:

Wherefore one finds a woman in the days of Leo the Roman emperor who knew neither by sense of hearing nor by the ancient practices the art of divination by clouds. The woman came from Aigai in Cilicia, having come from the family of the Orestiadai who dwell on the mountain at Komana in Cappadocia. Her family went back to the Peloponnese. She took thought for a man entrusted with a military command who was sent with others to the war against the Vandals in Sicily. She prayed to foresee the future by dream and prayed facing the rising sun. Her father prescribed and commanded her in a dream to pray toward the west. When she prayed, a cloud from the upper air stood around the sun, and became enlarged and took the shape of a man. Another cloud sheared off and rendered itself of equal size and took the shape of a wild lion. It went into a great rage and, having made a great chasm, the lion swallowed the man. The human, cloud-made shape was like a Goth. A little more about the apparitions; Thereupon the emperor Leo slew Aspar himself, the hegemon of the Goths (in Constantinople) and his children. From that time Anthusa has continued until now without interruption to practice the custom of mantic predition through clouds.

== Cultural influence ==
In ancient Greece an air-diviner was called aeromantis (ἀερόμαντις) and the practice was called aeromantia (ἀερομαντεία).

The ancient Etruscans produced guides to brontoscopic and fulgural divination of the future, based upon the omens that were supposedly displayed by thunder or lightning that occurred on particular days of the year, or in particular places.

Divination by clouds was condemned by Moses in Deuteronomy 18:10 and 18:14 in the Hebrew Bible. In contrast, English Christian bibles typically translate the same Hebrew words into "soothsayers" and "conjurers" or the like.

Johannes Hartlieb classified aeromancy as one of the seven "forbidden arts", along with necromancy, geomancy, hydromancy, pyromancy, chiromancy (palmistry), and spatulamancy (scapulimancy). It was condemned by Albertus Magnus in Speculum Astronomiae as a derivative of necromancy. The practice was further debunked by Luis de Valladolid in his 1889 work Historia de vita et doctrina Alberti Magni.
