= The Master Key System =

Book by Charles F. Haanel

- Author: Charles F. Haanel
- Language: English
- Subject: Personal-success; Self-help; Philosophy
- Genre: Non-fiction
- Publisher: Psychology Publishing
- Publication date: 1916
- Publication place: United States
- Media type: Print (Hardcover, Paperback, E-Book)
- Pages: 138
- ISBN: 978-1-61720-383-1

The Master Key System is a personal development book by Charles F. Haanel that was originally published as a 24-week correspondence course in 1912, and then in book form in 1916. The ideas it describes and explains come mostly from New Thought philosophy. It was one of the main sources of inspiration for Rhonda Byrne's film and book The Secret (2006).

== General description ==
The book describes many New Thought beliefs such as the law of attraction, creative visualization and man's unity with God, and teaches the importance of truth, harmonious thinking and the ability to concentrate. Each of the 24 chapters contains an introduction, followed by a sequentially numbered section which includes an exercise towards the end, followed by a section with questions and answers. At the beginning of the book is a Psychological Chart which readers are encouraged to complete, providing a self-evaluation of their creative power, time efficiency, health, mental ability and capacity to concentrate. The book ends with a glossary and general question-and-answers section. Every chapter includes a quotation from people such as Jonathan Edwards, Lilian Whiting and Amos Bronson Alcott.

== Exercises ==
Each chapter ends with an exercise which the reader is encouraged to undertake every day for the following 4–7 days. The exercises are meditations that require the reader to first sit comfortably in a chair.

The sequence of exercises in each chapter is as follows:

1. Sitting still
2. Inhibiting all thought combined with previous exercise
3. Releasing physical tension combined with previous exercises
4. Letting go of all negative emotions combined with previous exercises
5. Visualising a pleasant place
6. Remembering details from a photo of someone
7. Visualising positive facial expressions on the face of a friend
8. Visualising everything that leads to the construction of a battleship
9. Visualising a flower growing from seed
10. Visualising certain geometric forms
11. Concentrating on a quote from the Bible; Mark 11:24
12. Contemplating your unity with Omnipotence
13. Contemplating being part of the Whole
14. Focusing on harmony
15. Contemplating the fact that knowledge needs to be applied to be useful
16. Contemplating that happiness and harmony are states of consciousness
17. Focusing on the object of your desire
18. Focusing on your power to create – create a logical basis for your faith
19. Total concentration on what you want
20. Focusing on "In Him we live and move and have our being"
21. Focusing on truth
22. Concentration on a Tennyson quote: "Speak to Him, thou, for He hears, and spirit with spirit can meet, Closer is He than breathing, and nearer than hands and feet."
23. Contemplating the fact that man is a spirit with a body
24. Realising that this is a wonderful world

== Themes ==
The ideas behind the book mainly come from New Thought philosophy, but there are influences from other sources such as Hinduism, Masonism and Rosicrucian teachings, Theosophy, and the Bible.

== Influence ==
Along with The Science of Getting Rich, by Wallace D. Wattles, The Master Key System inspired much of the content of Rhonda Byrne's film The Secret (2006), which was later followed by a book of the same name.

It is claimed on the website haanel.com that Charles Haanel received a letter in 1919 from Napoleon Hill, who later went on to write one of the best-selling books of all time, Think and Grow Rich, saying that his own success was due to the principles laid down in The Master Key System.

Actor Terry Crews has described The Master Key System as his favorite book among hundreds of personal development books, saying that it showed him "how to visualize, contemplate, and focus on what I really wanted" and that he rereads it "probably once a month to keep my vision clear".

== Variations ==
There are many editions of the book. Modern editions mostly do not include the three-part introduction, the psychological chart, the question-and-answers section at the end of the book, or the glossary. Some modern editions also include 4 additional chapters which come from chapters 11–14 of another book Haanel wrote called A book about you. The first British Empire edition, printed in 1933 by The Master Key Publishing Company, is called The Master Key with no mention of the word "system".

== Quotations ==
The book contains many quotations. Some are printed at the end of chapters while others are in the main body of the text. This list shows all the people quoted in the 1919 edition, and the chapter or part of the book in which the quotes are found. Some editions arrange the quotations in slightly different orders and some have quotes that do not appear in the 1919 edition; for example, many have a quote by Benjamin Disraeli at the end of chapter 23.

- Seneca, Introduction
- James J. Hill, Introduction
- Elbert Gary, Introduction
- Walter Colton, 1
- Professor Davidson, 2
- James Allen, 2,7
- Prentice Mulford, 2,16
- Thomas Troward, 3
- Ralph Waldo Emerson, 3,5,10,17 & 19
- Walker, 3
- Herbert Spencer, 4
- Lyman Abbott, 4
- Helen Wilmans, 4
- Christian D. Larson, 6
- William Shakespeare, 6
- Nikola Tesla, 7
- George Matthew Adams, 8,14
- Kālidāsa, 8
- Frederick Andrews, 9
- James McCosh, 9
- A. B. Alcott, 9
- Henry Drummond, 10
- Thomas Huxley, 10
- John Tyndall, 10
- Lillian Whiting, 10
- Floyd Baker Wilson, 12
- Herbert Kaufman, 13
- Benjamin Franklin, 13
- Charles Mackay, 13
- Jacques Loeb, 15
- Horatio Bonar, 15
- Henry Flagler, 16
- H. W. Beecher, 16
- William Dunkerley, 16
- Christian Bovee, 17
- John Ambrose Fleming, 18
- G. A. Sala, 18
- Marcus Antonius, 18
- South, 19
- Johann Lavater, 20
- Johann Goethe, 20
- Orison Swett Marden, 21
- Frank Haddock, 21
- Alfred T Shofield, 22
- Alfred Tennyson, 22
- Alexander Pope, 22
- William Channing, 22
- William Walker Atkinson, 23
- Francis Larimer Warner, 23
- Samuel Smiles, 24
- Isaac Funk. Glossary
- Alexander Winchell. Glossary
- G. C. Robertson. Glossary
- William Inge. General questions & answers
- Jonathan Edwards. General questions & answers
- Joseph Joubert. On 'Go Slow' page, printed 12 times throughout book.

In addition to these quotations, the book quotes the Bible 23 times.

== Derivative works ==
- Abundance and Prosperity - The Master Key System Decoded, by Prof. C. W. Haanel Mentz ISBN 1-4257-1035-2
- The Electronic Master Key System in 24 Parts - Re-Edited, by Anthony R. Michalski.
- Master Key Arcana, by Anthony R. Michalski.
- Master Key System (28 Part Complete Deluxe Edition) - Ishtar Publishing (July 2007) ISBN 978-0-9780535-8-1
- The Master Key System 2012 Centenary Edition, edited, illustrated and annotated by Helmar Rudolph (January 2011) ISBN 978-1-4563360-4-2.
- Tapping the Source (2010), by William Gladstone, Richard Greninger, John Selby and Jack Canfield,
- The Master Key System Summarized & the Science of Getting Rich Decoded, by George Mentz.
- Masters of the Secrets Expanded, by Wallace Wattles, Charles Haanel, Thomas Troward, C. Wattles Haanel Mentz.

== Other books by Haanel ==
Master Key System and Mental Chemistry, being published prior to 1923, are considered to be in public domain, but several of his other books, being currently in distribution, are still covered by copyright law timeframe.

- Mental Chemistry
- The New Psychology
- A book about You
- The Amazing Secrets of the Yogi
