= The Science of Getting Rich =

1910 book by Wallace D. Wattles

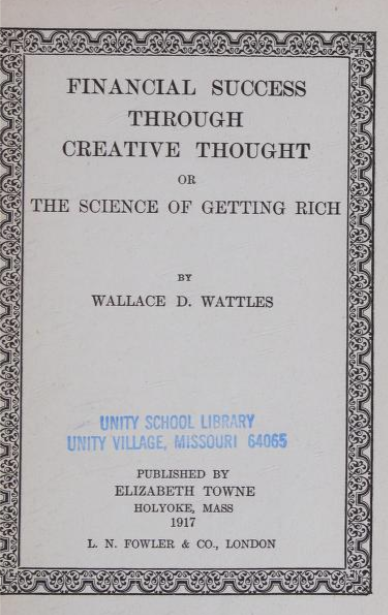
- Title page for Financial Success Through Creative Thought or the Science of Getting Rich (1917 edition)
- Author: Wallace D. Wattles
- Publisher: Elizabeth Towne Company
- Publication date: 1910
- Text: The Science of Getting Rich at Wikisource

Financial Success Through Creative Thought or the Science of Getting Rich is a book written by the New Thought Movement writer Wallace D. Wattles and published in 1910 by the Elizabeth Towne Company. The book is still in print. According to USA Today, the text is "divided into 17 short, straight-to-the-point chapters that explain how to overcome mental barriers, and how creation, rather than competition, is the hidden key to wealth attraction."

The contents of the book are commonly regarded as pseudoscientific in nature rather than based on legitimate wealth creation or investment strategies. It has been described by critics as "...essentially a power of positive thinking type of book with no real proven strategies."

== Historical context ==
This book is based on the Hindu philosophies that One is All, and that All is One (Page one of Preface). The Science of Getting Rich is based upon what Wattles called "the Certain Way of Thinking." According to Mitch Horowitz, the editor-in-chief of the Jeremy Tarcher imprint of Penguin Books, which reprinted The Science of Getting Rich in 2007, Wattles' "Certain Way" descended from the "mental healing movement" that had started earlier with Phineas P. Quimby in the mid-19th century. As Horowitz explained to a reporter from the Washington Post, after experiencing relief from physical symptoms of discomfort or illness through Quimby's mental strategies, people began to wonder, "If my state of mind seems to have a positive influence over how I feel physically, what other things can it do? Can it lead to prosperity? Can it lead to happiness in my home? Can it lead to finding love and romance?" One result of such questioning was Wattles's application of Quimbian "mental healing" strategies to financial as well as physiological situations.

Wattles, who had formerly been a Methodist, ran for office as a Socialist candidate in Indiana in 1916. He included the word science in the title, reflecting a secular approach to New Thought though also thereby borrowing from the then widespread popularity of Christian Science and its offshoots as he wrote about business prosperity, mind training, and success in the material world. The mental technique that he called "thinking in the Certain Way," was intended to establish a state of positivity and self-affirmation. According to Horowitz, mental healing and positive thinking theories for prosperity were joined by late 19th century trends such as Transcendentalism and a belief in the power of science and that "All these currents came together, and this philosophy that we call 'New Thought,' was born out of them. It's as American as an old-growth forest."

The contents, with chapter titles like "How to Use the Will" and "Further Use of the Will" advance Wattles' concept of the "Certain Way."; similar keywords about will power, mastery, and success are found in the writings of contemporary early 20th century authors Charles F. Haanel (The Master Key System), the Methodist minister Frank Channing Haddock (Power of Will, Power for Success, Mastery of Self for Wealth Power Success), and Elizabeth Towne (How to Grow Success). Towne published other books and magazine articles by Wattles: The Science of Getting Rich (1910) is a companion volume to the author's book on health from a New Thought perspective, The Science of Being Well (1910) and his personal self-help book The Science of Being Great (1911). All three were originally issued in matching bindings.

== Influence ==
The Science of Getting Rich preceded similar financial success books such as The Master Key System by Charles F. Haanel (1912) and Think and Grow Rich by Napoleon Hill (1937). In the 100 years since its publication, it has gone through many editions, and remains in print from more than one publisher.

The Science of Getting Rich was credited by Rhonda Byrne as one of the inspirations for her popular 2006 film and 2007 book The Secret. As Byrne explained it on the web site of Oprah Winfrey, "Something inside of me had me turn the pages one by one, and I can still remember my tears hitting the pages as I was reading it. [...] It gave me a glimpse of The Secret. It was like a flame inside of my heart. And with every day since, it's just become a raging fire of wanting to share all of this with the world."

The Science of Getting Rich was brought to worldwide attention via The Science of Getting Rich Network in 1999.

When Tarcher/Penguin reprinted the book in 2007, their initial print run was 75,000 copies.

The continuing influence of The Science of Getting Rich is such that in addition to reprints and audio versions of the book itself, there are a number of web domains whose names are based on its title.

The book is included in personal development scholar Tom Butler-Bowdon's list of "50 Success Classics" in his 2004 book of that name.
