= Subconscious =

Part of the mind that is not currently of focal awareness

In psychology, the subconscious is the part of the mind that is not currently of focal awareness. The term was already popularized in the early 20th century in areas ranging from psychology, religion, and spirituality. The concept was heavily popularized by Joseph Murphy's 1963 self-help book The Power of Your Subconscious Mind.

== Scholarly use of the term ==
The word subconscious represents an anglicized version of the French subconscient as coined by John Norris, in "An Essay Towards the Theory of the Ideal or Intelligible World" (1708): "The immediate objects of Sense, are not the objects of Intellection, they being of a Subconscient [subconscious] nature." A more recent use was in 1889 by the psychologist Pierre Janet (1859–1947), in his doctorate of letters thesis, Of Psychological Automatism (French: De l'Automatisme Psychologique. Janet argued that underneath the layers of critical-thought functions of the conscious mind lay a powerful awareness that he called the subconscious mind.

In the strict psychological sense, the adjective is defined as "operating or existing outside of consciousness".

Locke and Kristof write that there is a limit to what can be held in conscious focal awareness, an alternative storehouse of one's knowledge and prior experience is needed, which they label the subconscious.

== Psychoanalysis ==
Sigmund Freud used the term "subconscious" in 1893 to describe associations and impulses that are not accessible to consciousness. He later abandoned the term in favor of unconscious, noting the following:

If someone talks of subconsciousness, I cannot tell whether he means the term topographically – to indicate something lying in the mind beneath consciousness – or qualitatively – to indicate another consciousness, a subterranean one, as it were. He is probably not clear about any of it. The only trustworthy antithesis is between conscious and unconscious.

In 1896, in Letter 52, Freud introduced the stratification of mental processes, noting that memory-traces are occasionally re-arranged in accordance with new circumstances. In this theory, he differentiated between Wahrnehmungszeichen ("Indication of perception"), Unbewusstsein ("the unconscious") and Vorbewusstsein ("the preconscious"). From this point forward, Freud no longer used the term "subconscious" because, in his opinion, it failed to differentiate whether content and the processing occurred in the unconscious or preconscious mind.

Charles Rycroft explains that the subconscious is a term "never used in psychoanalytic writings". Peter Gay says that the use of the term subconscious where unconscious is meant is "a common and telling mistake"; indeed, "when [the term] is employed to say something 'Freudian', it is proof that the writer has not read [their] Freud".

== Analytical psychology ==
Carl Jung said that since there is a limit to what can be held in conscious focal awareness, an alternative storehouse of one's knowledge and prior experience is needed.

== "New Age" and other modalities targeting the subconscious ==
The idea of the subconscious as a powerful or potent agency has allowed the term to become prominent in New Age and self-help literature, in which investigating or controlling its supposed knowledge or power is seen as advantageous. In the New Age community, techniques such as autosuggestion and affirmations are believed to harness the power of the subconscious to influence a person's life and real-world outcomes, even curing sickness. Skeptical Inquirer magazine criticized the lack of falsifiability and testability of these claims. Physicist Ali Alousi, for instance, criticized it as unmeasurable and questioned the likelihood that thoughts can affect anything outside the head. In addition, critics have asserted that the evidence provided is usually anecdotal and that, because of the self-selecting nature of the positive reports, as well as the subjective nature of any results, these reports are susceptible to confirmation bias and selection bias.

Psychologists and psychiatrists use the term "unconscious" in traditional practices, where metaphysical and New Age literature often use the term "subconscious".

== See also ==
- Consciousness
- Collective unconscious
- History of hypnosis
- Non-rapid eye movement sleep
- Preconscious
- Rapid eye movement sleep
- Slow-wave sleep
- Subliminal stimuli
- Unconscious mind

Transdisciplinary topics

- List of thought processes
- Philosophy of mind
