= Law of attraction (New Thought) =

Pseudoscientific belief

The law of attraction is the New Thought spiritual belief that positive or negative thoughts bring positive or negative experiences into a person's life. The belief is based on the idea that people and their thoughts are made from "pure energy" and that like energy can attract like energy, thereby allowing people to improve their health, wealth, or personal relationships. There is no empirical scientific evidence supporting the law of attraction, and it is widely considered to be pseudoscience or religion couched in scientific language. This belief has alternative names that have varied in popularity over time, including manifestation.

Advocates generally combine cognitive reframing techniques with affirmations and creative visualization to replace limiting or self-destructive ("negative") thoughts with more empowered, adaptive ("positive") thoughts. A key component of the philosophy is the idea that in order to effectively change one's negative thinking patterns, one must also "feel" (through creative visualization) that the desired changes have already occurred. This combination of positive thought and positive emotion is believed to allow one to attract positive experiences and opportunities by achieving resonance with the proposed energetic law.

While some supporters of the law of attraction refer to scientific theories and use them as arguments in favor of it, the law of attraction has no demonstrable scientific basis. A number of scientists have criticized the misuse of scientific concepts by its proponents. Recent empirical research has shown that while individuals who indulge in manifestation and law of attraction beliefs often do exhibit higher perceived levels of success, these beliefs are also seen being associated with higher risk taking behaviors, particularly financial risks, and show a susceptibility to bankruptcy.

== History ==
The New Thought movement grew out of the teachings of Phineas Quimby in the early 19th century. Early in his life, Quimby was diagnosed with tuberculosis. Early 19th century medicine had no reliable cure for tuberculosis. Quimby took to horse riding and noted that intense excitement temporarily relieved him from his affliction. This method for relieving his pain and seemingly subsequent recovery prompted Quimby to pursue a study of mind over body. Although he never used the words law of attraction, he explained this in a statement that captured the concept in the field of health:

the trouble is in the mind, for the body is only the house for the mind to dwell in, and we put a value on it according to its worth. Therefore if your mind has been deceived by some invisible enemy into a belief, you have put it into the form of a disease, with or without your knowledge. By my theory or truth, I come in contact with your enemy and restore you to your health and happiness. This I do partly mentally and partly by talking till I correct the wrong impressions and establish the Truth, and the Truth is the cure.

Historian Mitch Horowitz noted that the term law of attraction first appeared in 1855 in The Great Harmonia, vol. IV, by American Spiritualist Andrew Jackson Davis, in a context alluding to the human soul and spheres of the afterlife.

The first articulator of the law of attraction as general principle was Prentice Mulford. Mulford, a pivotal figure in the development of New Thought thinking, discusses the law at length in his essay "The Law of Success", published 1886–1887. In this, Mulford was followed by other New Thought authors, such as Henry Wood (starting with his God's Image in Man, 1892), and Ralph Waldo Trine (starting with his first book, What All the World's A-Seeking, 1896). For these authors, the law of attraction is concerned not only about health but every aspect of life.

The 20th century saw a surge in interest in the subject with many books being written about it, amongst which are two of the best-selling books of all time: Think and Grow Rich (1937) by Napoleon Hill, The Power of Positive Thinking (1952) by Norman Vincent Peale, and You Can Heal Your Life (1984) by Louise Hay.

Beginning in 1993, the best-selling series Chicken Soup for the Soul, by Jack Canfield and Mark Victor Hansen—motivational speakers and proponents of the law of attraction—used inspirational stories as examples of the law of attraction.

In 2006, the concept of the law of attraction gained renewed exposure with the release of the film The Secret (2006) which was then developed into a book of the same title in the same year. The movie and book gained widespread media coverage. This was followed by a sequel, The Power in 2010 that talks about the law of attraction being the law of love. The Abraham–Hicks material is based primarily around the law of attraction.

A modernized version of the law of attraction is known as manifestation, which refers to various self-help strategies that can purportedly make an individual's wishes come true by mentally visualizing them. Manifestation techniques involve positive thinking or directing requests to "the universe" as well as actions on the part of the individual.

=== Lucky girl syndrome ===
An incarnation of the law of attraction appearing in the early 2020s is known as lucky girl syndrome. According to Woman's Health this is "the idea that you can attract things you want (like luck, money, love, etc.) by repeating mantras and truly believing things will work out for you." In early 2023 AARP explained that "The newest self-help craze, lucky girl syndrome is Gen Z's spin on books like The Power of Positive Thinking, The Secret and Manifest Your Destiny: The Nine Spiritual Principles for Getting Everything You Want. This year's version, however, puts the emphasis on luck and consistently reminding yourself that the universe is conspiring to make good things happen for you because you are a lucky person." The BBC reported that "There isn't scientific evidence for it... some have called it the 'smuggest TikTok trend yet'".

A January 2023 article in CNET explained that "thousands of people across TikTok have posted videos about how this manifestation strategy has changed their lives, bringing them new opportunities they never expected. Manifestation is the concept of thinking things into being -- by believing something enough, it will happen."

Also in January 2023, Today.com reported that "Different manifestation techniques are taking over TikTok, and 'lucky girl syndrome' is the latest way people claim to achieve the life they desire." It also said that "Videos detailing the power of positive thinking have amassed millions of views on TikTok, and manifestation experts seem to approve." The article also quoted a manifestation coach as saying "the lucky girl mindset is, indeed, a true practice of manifestation", and that it has been around for years.

As reported by Vox, "If 2020 was the year that TikTokers discovered The Secret – that is, the idea that you can make anything you want happen if you believe in it enough – then the two years that followed are when they've tried to rebrand it into perpetual relevance. Its most recent makeover is something rather ominously called 'lucky girl syndrome...'" The article also reported that "What lucky girl syndrome – and The Secret, and the 'law of attraction', or the 'law of assumption', and prosperity gospel, and any of the other branches of this kind of New Age thinking – really amounts to, though, is 'manifesting', or the practice of repeatedly writing or saying declarative statements in the hopes that they will soon become true." The Vox article concludes "It never hurts to be curious, though. When you come across a shiny new term on TikTok, it's worth interrogating where it came from, and whether the person using it is someone worth listening to. Often, it's not that they're any better at living than you are; they're just better at marketing it."

Attempting to explain the attraction of lucky girl syndrome, Parents interviewed an LCSW therapist for teens and their families on the subject who opined that "It makes us feel like we're in control of our lives. Gen Z is constantly exposed to bad news, from layoffs to political conflicts to the student loan crisis. It makes sense that they'd be drawn to something that would make them feel a greater sense of agency and control."

The Conversation warned of the negative side of lucky girl syndrome, saying that what most videos on the topic suggest is "that what you put out to the universe is what you will get in return. So if you think you're poor or unsuccessful, this is what you'll get back. Obviously, this is quite an unhelpful message, which likely won't do much for the self-esteem of people who don't feel particularly lucky – let alone those facing significant hardship."

Also regarding negative consequences, Harper's Bazaar warned that lucky girl syndrome has much in common with toxic positivity and that "If you try it, and it doesn't work for you, it could become yet another stick to beat yourself with. If you already feel vulnerable or wobbly, this could well be something else that makes you feel bad about yourself... it ignores the fact that life is not fair. And it ignores that some people are more privileged than others. It doesn't take into account the systemic and structural biases and inequalities that exist in the world."

== Descriptions ==
Proponents believe that the law of attraction is always in operation and that it brings to each person the conditions and experiences that they predominantly think about, or which they desire or expect.

Charles Haanel wrote in The Master Key System (1912):

The law of attraction will certainly and unerringly bring to you the conditions, environment, and experiences in life, corresponding with your habitual, characteristic, predominant mental attitude.

Ralph Trine wrote in In Tune with the Infinite (1897):

The law of attraction works universally on every plane of action, and we attract whatever we desire or expect. If we desire one thing and expect another, we become like houses divided against themselves, which are quickly brought to desolation. Determine resolutely to expect only what you desire, then you will attract only what you wish for.

In her 2006 documentary, The Secret, Rhonda Byrne emphasized thinking about what each person wants to obtain, but also to infuse the thought with the maximum possible amount of emotion. She claims the combination of thought and feeling is what attracts the desire. Another similar book is James Redfield's The Celestine Prophecy, which says reality can be manifested by man. The Power of Your Subconscious Mind by Joseph Murphy, says readers can achieve seemingly impossible goals by learning how to bring the mind itself under control. The Power by Rhonda Byrne and The Alchemist by Paulo Coelho are similar. While there are personal testimonies that claim that methods based on The Secret and the law of attraction have worked for them, a number of skeptics have criticized Byrne's film and book. The New York Times Book Review called The Secret pseudoscience and an "illusion of knowledge".

== Philosophical and religious basis ==
The New Thought concept of the law of attraction is rooted in ideas that come from various philosophical and religious traditions. In particular, it has been inspired by Hermeticism, New England transcendentalism, specific verses from the Bible, and Hinduism.

Hermeticism influenced the development of European thought in the Renaissance. Its ideas were transmitted partly through alchemy. In the 18th century, Franz Mesmer studied the works of alchemists such as Paracelsus and van Helmont. Van Helmont was a 17th-century Flemish physician who proclaimed the curative powers of the imagination. This led Mesmer to develop his ideas about Animal magnetism which Phineas Quimby, the founder of New Thought, studied.

The Transcendentalist movement developed in the United States immediately before the emergence of New Thought and is thought to have had a great influence on it. George Ripley, an important figure in that movement, stated that its leading idea was "the supremacy of mind over matter".

New Thought authors often quote certain verses from the Bible in the context of the law of attraction. An example is Mark 11:24: "Therefore I tell you, whatever you ask in prayer, believe that you have received it, and it will be yours."

In the late 19th century Swami Vivekananda traveled to the United States and gave lectures on Hinduism. These talks greatly influenced the New Thought movement and in particular, William Walker Atkinson who was one of New Thought's pioneers.

== Criticism ==
The law of attraction has been popularized in the early 21st century by books and films such as The Secret. The 2006 film and the subsequent book use interviews with New Thought authors and speakers to explain the principles of the proposed metaphysical law that one can attract anything that one thinks about consistently. Writing for the Committee for Skeptical Inquiry, Mary Carmichael and Ben Radford wrote that "neither the film nor the book has any basis in scientific reality", and that its premise contains "an ugly flipside: if you have an accident or disease, it's your fault".

Others have questioned the references to modern scientific theory, and have maintained, for example, that the law of attraction misrepresents the electrical activity of brainwaves. Victor Stenger and Leon Lederman were critical of attempts to use quantum mysticism to bridge any unexplained or seemingly implausible effects, believing these to be traits of modern pseudoscience.

Skeptical Inquirer magazine criticized the lack of falsifiability and testability of these claims. Critics have asserted that the evidence provided is usually anecdotal and that, because of the self-selecting nature of the positive reports, as well as the subjective nature of any results, these reports are susceptible to confirmation bias and selection bias. Physicist Ali Alousi, for instance, criticized it as unmeasurable and questioned the likelihood that thoughts can affect anything outside the head.

The mantra of The Secret, and by extension, the law of attraction, is as follows: positive thoughts and positive visualization will have a direct impact on the self. While positivity can improve one's quality of life and resilience through hardship, it can also be misguiding. Holding the belief that positive thinking will manifest positivity in one's life diminishes the value of hard work and perseverance, such as in the 1970s pursual of "self-esteem-based education".

== Notable supporters ==
- In 1897, Ralph Waldo Trine wrote In Tune with the Infinite. In the second paragraph of chapter 9 he writes, "The Law of Attraction works unceasingly throughout the universe, and the one great and never changing fact in connection with it is, as we have found, that like attracts like."
- In 1904, Thomas Troward, a strong influence in the New Thought movement, gave a lecture in which he claimed that thought precedes physical form and "the action of Mind plants that nucleus which, if allowed to grow undisturbed, will eventually attract to itself all the conditions necessary for its manifestation in outward visible form."
- In 1905, Elizabeth Towne in her book You and Your Forces or The Constitution of Man, writes, "The Law of Attraction governs in all knowledge," "Desire is the Law of Attraction, become conscious through recognition," and "The correspondence of not only bodily diseases, but outward experiences, to the temperament, is absolutely fixed. It is governed by unalterable law-the Law of Attraction."
- In 1906, in the title of his New Thought movement book William Walker Atkinson used the phrase Thought Vibration or the Law of Attraction in the Thought World, stating that "like attracts like".
- In his 1910 The Science of Getting Rich. Wallace D. Wattles espoused similar principles – that simply believing in the object of one's desire and focusing on it will lead to that object or goal being realized on the material plane (Wattles claims in the Preface and later chapters of this book that his premise stems from the monistic Hindu view that God provides everything and can deliver what is focused on). The book also claims negative thinking will manifest negative results.
- In 1915, Theosophical author William Quan Judge used the phrase in The Ocean of Theosophy.
- In 1919, another theosophical author Annie Besant discussed the law of attraction. Besant compared her version of it to gravitation, and said that the law represented a form of karma.
- Napoleon Hill published two books on the theme. The first, The Law of Success in 16 Lessons (1928), directly and repeatedly references the law of attraction and proposes that it operates by use of radio waves transmitted by the brain. The second, Think and Grow Rich (1937), went on to sell 100 million copies by 2015. Hill insisted on the importance of controlling one's own thoughts in order to achieve success, as well as the energy that thoughts have and their ability to attract other thoughts. He mentions a "secret" to success and promises to indirectly describe it at least once in every chapter. It is never named and he says that discovering it on one's own is far more beneficial. Many people have argued over what it actually is; some claim it is the law of attraction. Hill states the "secret" is mentioned no fewer than a hundred times, yet reference to "attract" is used less than 30 times in the text.
- In 1944, Neville Goddard published Feeling Is the Secret, which promoted creative visualization and emotional feeling as a form of meditation to receive desires from the universe. His second book on the topic, Out of This World (1949), explored the reasoning behind the so-called "feeling" and how assumptions if repeated enough can "harden into fact". His third book, The Power of Awareness (1952), Goddard explains of the concept of "I am" to reason that the human subconscious mind has a "god-given" ability to manifest and create reality if it is impressed by the feeling.
- In 1960, W. Clement Stone and Napoleon Hill co-wrote Success Through a Positive Mental Attitude.
- In his 1988 The American Myth of Success, Richard Weiss states that the principle of "non-resistance" is a popular concept of the New Thought movement and is taught in conjunction with the law of attraction.
- The 2008, Esther and Jerry Hicks' book Money and the Law of Attraction: Learning to Attract Health, Wealth & Happiness appeared on the New York Times Best Seller list.

== See also ==
- Bootstrap paradox
- Cosmic ordering
- Efficacy of prayer
- Hermeticism
- Internal locus of control
- Law of contagion
- List of New Thought writers
- Magical thinking
- Medical students' disease
- Mind over matter
- "Our Thoughts Determine Our Lives" - a quote and book by Serbian Orthodox elder Thaddeus of Vitovnica
- Positive mental attitude
- Priming (psychology)
- Placebo
- Prosperity theology
- Pygmalion effect
- Self-fulfilling prophecy
- Sympathetic magic
- Toxic positivity
