= Manifestation (popular psychology) =

Supposed supernatural ability

Manifestation, or manifesting, is the supposed ability to supernaturally will one's desires into reality.

== History ==
Based on the pseudoscientific law of attraction and the ideas of Neville Goddard, manifestation refers to various self-help strategies that can purportedly make an individual's wishes come true by mentally visualizing them. Manifestation techniques involve positive thinking or directing requests to "the universe" as well as actions on the part of the individual. Though based on ideas going back to the early 19th century, manifestation as a distinct practice originated on TikTok and in Internet culture in the early 2020s.

A January 2023 article in CNET explained that "thousands of people across TikTok have posted videos about how this manifestation strategy has changed their lives, bringing them new opportunities they never expected. Manifestation is the concept of thinking things into being—by believing something enough, it will happen."

Also in January 2023, Today.com reported that "Different manifestation techniques are taking over TikTok, and 'lucky girl syndrome' is the latest way people claim to achieve the life they desire." It also said that "Videos detailing the power of positive thinking have amassed millions of views on TikTok, and manifestation experts seem to approve." The article also quoted a manifestation coach as saying "the lucky girl mindset is, indeed, a true practice of manifestation", and that it has been around for years.

== Methodology ==
As reported by Vox, manifestation methods essentially consist of, "repeatedly writing or saying declarative statements in the hopes that they will soon become true."

=== 3–6–9 method ===
The 3–6–9 method involves, "writing down what you'd like to manifest three times in the morning, six times in the afternoon, and nine times at night."

=== Lucky girl syndrome ===
Lucky girl syndrome is a technique for obtaining luck by repeating, "I'm so lucky." Samantha Palazzolo, a popular TikTok creator and proponent of the technique, said it, "shows that I have control over my life and that I can be responsible for myself and do what I want."

== See also ==
- Baskerville effect
- The Secret
- Subliminal stimuli
- Tinkerbell effect
- Toxic positivity
