= Wallace Wattles =

American writer (1860–1911)

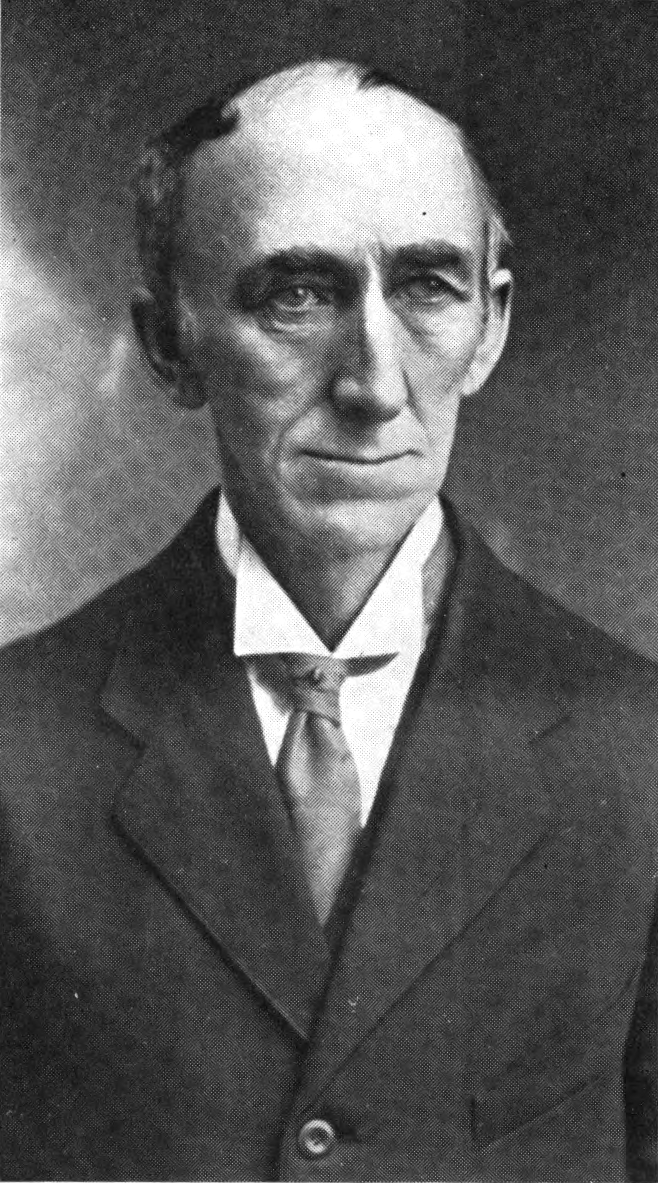
- Wallace D. Wattles
- Born: 1860
- Died: 7 February 1911 (aged 50-51)
- Occupation: Writer
- Notable work: The Science of Getting Rich

Wallace Delois Wattles (/ˈwɑːtəlz/; 1860 – 7 February 1911) was an American New Thought writer. He remains personally somewhat obscure, but his writing has been widely quoted and remains in print in the New Thought and self-help movements.

Wattles' best known work is a 1910 book called The Science of Getting Rich, in which he explains his spiritual ideology on how to become wealthy.

== Life and career ==
Wattles' daughter, Florence A. Wattles, described her father's life in a "Letter" that was published shortly after his death in the New Thought magazine Nautilus, edited by Elizabeth Towne. The Nautilus had previously carried articles by Wattles in almost every issue, and Towne was also his book publisher. Florence Wattles wrote that her father was born in the U.S. in 1860, received little formal education, and found himself excluded from the world of commerce and wealth.

According to the 1880 US Federal Census, Wallace lived with his parents on a farm in Nunda Township, McHenry County, Illinois, and worked as a farm laborer. His father is listed as a gardener and his mother as "keeping house". Wallace is listed as being born in Illinois while his parents are listed as born in New York. No other siblings are recorded as living with the family. According to the 1910 census, Wattles was married to Abbie Wattles (née Bryant), 47. They had three children: Florence Wattles, 22, Russell H. Wattles, 27, and Agnes Wattles, 16. It also shows that at the time Wallace's mother Mary A. Wattles was living with the family at the age of 79.

Florence wrote that "he made lots of money, and had good health, except for his extreme frailty" in the last three years before his death. Wattles died on February 7, 1911, in Ruskin, Tennessee, and his body was transported home for burial to Elwood, Indiana. As a sign of respect, businesses closed throughout the town for two hours on the afternoon of his funeral.

His death at age 51 was regarded as "untimely" by his daughter; in the previous year he had not only published two books (The Science of Being Well and The Science of Getting Rich), but he had also run for public office.

== Christian Socialism ==
In 1896 in Chicago, Illinois, Wattles attended "a convention of reformers" and met George Davis Herron, a Congregational Church minister and professor of Applied Christianity at Grinnell College who was then attracting nationwide attention by preaching a form of Christian Socialism.

After meeting Herron, Wattles became a social visionary and began to expound upon what Florence called "the wonderful, social message of Jesus." According to Florence, he at one time had held a position in the Methodist Church, but was ejected for his "heresy". Two of his books (A New Christ and Jesus: The Man and His Work) dealt with Christianity from a Socialist perspective.

In the 1908 election, he ran as a Socialist Party of America candidate in the Eighth Congressional District; in 1910 he again ran as a Socialist candidate, for the office of Prosecuting Attorney for the Madison County, Indiana 50th court district. He did not win either election. Florence Wattles remained a Socialist after his death, and was a delegate to the Socialist Party National Committee in 1912 and 1915.

== New Thought ==
As a Midwesterner, Wattles traveled to Chicago, where several leading New Thought leaders were located, among them Emma Curtis Hopkins and William Walker Atkinson, and he gave "Sunday night lectures" in Indiana; however, his primary publisher was Massachusetts-based Elizabeth Towne.

He studied the writings of Georg Wilhelm Friedrich Hegel and Ralph Waldo Emerson, and recommended the study of their books to his readers who wished to understand what he characterized as "the monistic theory of the cosmos."

Through his personal study and experimentation Wattles claimed to have discovered the truth of New Thought principles and put them into practice in his own life. He wrote books outlining these principles and practices, giving them titles that described their content, such as Health Through New Thought and Fasting and The Science of Being Great. His daughter Florence recalled that "he lived every page" of his books.

A practical author, Wattles encouraged his readers to test his theories on themselves rather than take his word as an authority, and he claimed to have tested his methods on himself and others before publishing them.

Wattles practiced the technique of creative visualization. In his daughter Florence's words, he "formed a mental picture" or visual image, and then "worked toward the realization of this vision":

He wrote almost constantly. It was then that he formed his mental picture. He saw himself as a successful writer, a personality of power, an advancing man, and he began to work toward the realization of this vision. He lived every page... His life was truly the powerful life.

== Diet ==
Wattles held pseudoscientific ideas about diet and was an advocate of fasting. He argued that energy and strength is not drawn from food but from a "mysterious power", a life force that is received into the body during sleep via the brain by God. Wattles believed that fasting opened the door to the possibility of spiritual immortality. He advocated the then-popular theories of "The Great Masticator" Horace Fletcher as well as the "No-Breakfast Plan" of Edward Hooker Dewey, which he claimed to have applied to his own life.

== Influence ==
Rhonda Byrne told a Newsweek interviewer that her inspiration for creating the 2006 hit film The Secret, and the subsequent book by the same name, was her exposure to Wattles's The Science of Getting Rich. Byrne's daughter, Hayley, had given her mother a copy of the Wattles book to help her recover from her breakdown. The film itself also references, by re-popularizing the term The Law of Attraction, a 1908 book by another New Thought author, William Walker Atkinson, titled Thought Vibration or the Law of Attraction in the Thought World.

== Bibliography ==
- Wattles, W. D (1904). Scientific marriage. Marion, Ind.: W.D. Wattles. OCLC 34051696.
- Wattles, W. D (1905). Jesus, the man and his work,. Cincinnati?. OCLC 44771853 (A long speech made into a pamphlet, and the base of "A New Christ").
- Wattles, W. D (1907). The new science of living and healing. Holyoke, Mass.: Elizabeth Towne. OCLC 173248799. republished as *Health Through New Thought and Fasting (Elizabeth Towne, 1924)
- Wattles, W. D (1909). Making the man who can. Holyoke, Mass.: Elizabeth Towne. OCLC 15166857. republished later as How to Promote Yourself (Elizabeth Towne, May 5, 1914)
- Wattles, W. D (1910). What Is Truth? (1909) (serialized in The Nautilus Magazine, Holyoke, Mass.: Elizabeth Towne)
- Wattles, W. D (1910). "Perpetual Youth" (1909, in The Cavalier), an early science fiction story.
- Wattles, W. D (1910). A new Christ. United States: publisher not identified. OCLC 71205618.
- Wattles, W. D. (1910). Hell-fire Harrison ... Illustrated and decorated in colors by Frank T. Merrill. Boston: L. C. Page & Co. OCLC 1158155497
- Wattles, W. D (c.1910). Letters to a Woman's Husband (pamphlet)
- Wattles, W. D (c.1910). The Constructive Use of Foods (pamphlet)
- Wattles, W. D (n. d.). How to get what you want. Holyoke, Mass.: Elizabeth Towne Co. OCLC 80529245.

"The Science of" trilogy:

- Wattles, W. D (1910). The Science of Getting Rich. Holyoke, Mass.: E. Towne. OCLC 7806018. Republished posthumously in 1915 as Financial success through creative thought. San Gabriel, Calif.; Los Angeles: Willing; Distributed by Scrivener. OCLC 36936118.
- Wattles, W. D (1910). The science of being well. Holyoke, Mass.: Towne. OCLC 9139133.
- Wattles, W. D (1911). The science of being great. Holyoke, Mass.: E. Towne. OCLC 5883077.

== See also ==
- Napoleon Hill
- Charles F. Haanel
- Joseph Murphy (author)
- Law of attraction (New Thought)
- Thomas Troward
- Genevieve Behrend
