= Affirmations (New Age) =

Practice of positive thinking and self-empowerment

Affirmations in New Thought and New Age terminology refer primarily to the practice of positive thinking and self-empowerment—fostering a belief that "a positive mental attitude supported by affirmations will achieve success in anything." More specifically, an affirmation is a carefully formatted statement that should be repeated to one's self and written down frequently. For affirmations to be effective, it is said that they need to be present tense, positive, personal, and specific.

== New Thought ==
The New Thought movement is not part of New Age but does share certain practices. This concept has grown popular due to Rhonda Byrne's The Secret (also a 2006 film) These books and teachers express similar ideas to Napoleon Hill's book Think and Grow Rich. Byrne was inspired in particular by Wallace D. Wattles' 1910 book The Science of Getting Rich. Affirmations are also referred to in Neurolinguistic Programming (NLP), Neuro Associative Conditioning "NAC" as popularized by Anthony Robbins, and hypnosis.

A related belief is that a certain critical mass of people with a highly spiritual consciousness will bring about a sudden change in the whole population. And that humans have a responsibility to take part in positive creative activity and to work to heal ourselves, each other and the Earth.

In 1984 Louise Hay, a Religious Science practitioner, published You Can Heal Your Life, a guide to changing thoughts and beliefs. Hay's affirmations are designed to help the user re-program their thought patterns, the intention being that harmful underlying beliefs which Hay believes psychologically support illness will be replaced with healing beliefs, and thus remove a barrier to healing.

== New Age ==
Esther Hicks, author of the Law of Attraction series, advocates using affirmations when one is already in a state of happiness and peace.

New-Age affirmations come in different forms:

- affirmative images,
- affirmative words
- affirmative videos
- classes
- lectures
- mantra chants
- spiritual talks

== Rhonda Britten ==
According to Rhonda Britten, affirmations work best when combined with acknowledgements because the acknowledgements build up a backlog of results in one's mind to prove that one can do what one is affirming. For example, the acknowledgement "I bought a good pair of sneakers and some gym clothes" could complement the affirmation "I can reach my goal of losing 20 pounds." The goal is to focus on steps one has taken toward accomplishing one's goals rather than criticizing oneself for what one has not yet accomplished, or could theoretically have accomplished but did not.

== Scientific research ==
A 2009 study found that present tense positive affirmation had a positive effect on people with high self-esteem, but a detrimental effect on those with low self esteem. Individuals with low self-esteem who made present tense (e.g. "I am") positive affirmations felt worse than individuals who made positive statements but were allowed to consider ways in which the statements were false. Individuals with low self-esteem who made future tense affirmations (e.g. "I will") saw positive effects.

Some studies have found that self-affirmations, which involve writing about one's core values rather than repeating a positive self-statement, can improve performance under stress.

An fMRI study in 2016 demonstrated the role of two reward and valuation brain regions (ventral striatum and ventromedial prefrontal cortex) as primary pathways associated with self-affirmation. Self-related processing and prospection associated regions in the brain were further associated with objectively measured positive behavioral changes following future-oriented self-affirmations.

Recent studies have suggested that affirmative practices incorporating mindfulness have shown a positive relationship with emotional self-regulation by improving mental well-being and fostering a more focused and non-judgmental state of mind.

== See also ==
- Affirmative prayer
- Autogenic training
- Creative visualization
- Gratitude
- Rationality
- Self-esteem
