= Bob Proctor (author) =

Canadian author (1934–2022)

- Born: July 5, 1934; Guelph, Ontario, Canada
- Died: February 3, 2022 (aged 87)
- Occupations: Author; salesman; spiritual insights
- Writing career
- Period: 1984–2022
- Genre: Self-help
- Notable works: You Were Born Rich (1984); The Secret (2006)

Robert Corlett Proctor (July 5, 1934 – February 3, 2022) was a Canadian, new thought self-help author and business owner. He was best known for his New York Times best-selling book You Were Born Rich (1984) and being a contributor to the film The Secret (2006). Proctor's business model maintained the idea that a positive self-image was critical for obtaining success, frequently referencing the pseudoscientific law of attraction.

Proctor's teachings, business and publications were claimed by some to be a contributor to the rise of interest in the law of attraction. Medical experts however expressed concerns that individuals may opt for Proctor's model of positive thinking, rather than opt for physical therapies or medical intervention.

The law of attraction originates from quantum mysticism which claims that positive thinking can shape reality. Critics say that quantum mysticism cannot be connected to quantum mechanics without drawing upon "coincidental similarities of language rather than genuine connections". Proctor contended his teachings were "the basic laws of the universe".

== Life and career ==
=== Early years ===
Proctor claimed to have had a poor self-image and little ambition as a child. After graduating 8th grade public school, he enrolled at Danforth Tech, but dropped out a couple of months later after a bandsaw-inflicted thumb injury left him with no plans for the future (he later said, "It was dangling there. It still hurts, and that's 60 years ago"). In his autobiography, Proctor described that after dropping out of school he held a number of odd jobs, in his own words, "dumb jobs, like factories, freaking gas stations, you know, changing tires, lubricating cars, oil, changing the oil. I just did anything that come along." For a while he served as a sailor with the Canadian Royal Navy solely on a shore duty, claiming to have never been on a ship during his navy service. However, in the early 1960s, Proctor was working with the Toronto Fire Department, when a man named Raymond Douglas Stanford shared the book Think and Grow Rich with him. Soon afterward, Proctor claimed his life started to change as the book shifted his focus in life. Proctor claimed he quit his job at the fire department, and started a company offering cleaning services as his first enterprise - a venture that netted him over $100,000 in his starting year despite having neither formal education nor business experience.

=== You Were Born Rich and The Secret ===
Proctor claimed to have joined the Nightingale-Conant Organization and worked his way up within the company, being mentored by Earl Nightingale.

In 1984, the book You Were Born Rich was published by McCrary Publishing. Prior to that, other publishers rejected it, noting that "this book is absurd." The book went on to become a New York Times international best seller. It also caught the attention of Australian-based filmmaker Rhonda Byrne, leading her to request that Proctor participate in the 2006 movie The Secret.

=== Death ===
Proctor died on February 3, 2022, at the age of 87. A press release sent by the Proctor Gallagher Institute stated that his death was due to "natural causes".

== Law of attraction ==
Throughout his material, Proctor aimed to have the reader tap into their "inner self". He suggested the reader's inner self controls all that is brought into their life and that a bad self-image, which he called a "paradigm", will lead to poor results even among those with adequate knowledge and abilities.

Proctor contended that everything in the universe vibrates and that “similar vibrations attract each other”. Using images of Kirlian photography for his marketing material, he mistakenly suggested that the photographic method demonstrated a person's "energy field" and that the mind and body vibrate at specific frequencies which, if harnessed, could produce or attract specific results. Through this theory, he then suggested humans are "capable of controlling their thoughts" and as such, they should be capable of choosing to manipulate these "vibrational frequencies" to adjust or control their life outcomes by attracting objects (such as money, housing and clients) which "vibrate at a similar frequency". Proctor's comments demonstrated either a wilful or accidental interpretation of both quantum mechanics and Kirlian photography, because no "energy field" has been found to emit from the body, nor can the body change its "vibrational frequencies" to "attract items of a similar vibration".

Despite regular criticism from experts, Proctor claimed there was nothing in a person's life they could not change through the law of attraction. Proctor also suggested that even a global recession was the result of excessive vibrational negativity which attracted the recession to the economy. In a 2009 article, The Wall Street Journal opined that if any of Proctor's followers believed that they could simply choose not to participate in the recession they were "being shammed".

== See also ==
• Energy (esotericism)
