= Joseph Murphy (writer) =

American writer (1898–1981)

Joseph Denis Murphy (May 20, 1898 – December 16, 1981) was an Irish writer and New Thought minister, ordained in Divine Science and Religious Science.

== Early life ==
Joseph Denis Murphy was born in Ballydehob, County Cork, Ireland, the son of a private boys' school headmaster and raised a Roman Catholic. He joined the Jesuits. Murphy was enrolled in the National School and was encouraged to study for the priesthood and was accepted as a Jesuit seminarian.

However, by the time he reached his late teen years, he began to question the Catholic orthodoxy of the Jesuits, and he withdrew from the seminary. His goal was to explore new ideas and gain new experiences—a goal he could not pursue in Catholic-dominated Ireland—he left his family to go to the United States. In his twenties, before being ordained a priest, an experience with healing prayer led him to leave the Jesuits and emigrate in 1922.

He journeyed as a steerage passenger on board the RMS Cedric, sailing from Liverpool, England, to the Port of New York; on the ship's passenger manifest, his occupation was listed as chemist, the Irish term for pharmacist. He became a professional pharmacist in New York City (having a degree in chemistry by that time). Here he attended the Church of the Healing Christ (part of the Church of Divine Science), where Emmet Fox had become minister in 1931.

== Career ==
Murphy traveled to India and spent a lot of time with Indian sages, learning Hindu philosophy. He later on formed a new church in America with Hindu ideologies.

In the mid-1940s, he moved to Los Angeles, where he met Religious Science founder Ernest Holmes, and was ordained into Religious Science by Holmes in 1946, thereafter teaching at Rochester, New York, and later at the Institute of Religious Science in Los Angeles. A meeting with Divine Science Association president Erwin Gregg led to him being re-ordained into Divine Science, and he became the minister of the Los Angeles Divine Science Church in 1949, which he built into one of the largest New Thought congregations in the country.

When the United States entered World War II, Murphy enlisted in the Army and was assigned to work as a pharmacist in the medical unit of the 88th Infantry Division. At that time, he renewed his interest in religion and began to read extensively about various spiritual beliefs. After his discharge from the Army, he chose not to return to his career in pharmacy. He traveled extensively, taking courses in several universities both in the United States and abroad.

A person who had a particularly strong influence on Murphy was Thomas Troward, who was a judge as well as a philosopher, doctor, and professor. Troward became Murphy's mentor. From him he not only learned philosophy, theology, and law, but also was introduced to mysticism and particularly, the Masonic order. He became an active member of this order, and over the years rose in the Masonic ranks to the 32nd degree in the Scottish Rite.

Murphy chose to become a minister and bring his broad knowledge to the public. As his concept of Christianity was not traditional and ran counter to many of the Christian denominations, he founded his own church in Los Angeles. He attracted a small number of congregants, but it did not take long for his message of optimism and hope rather than the “sin-and-damnation” sermons of so many ministers to attract many men and women to his church.

Murphy was a proponent of the New Thought movement. This movement was developed in the late 19th and early 20th centuries by many philosophers and deep thinkers who studied this phenomenon and preached, wrote, and practiced a new way of looking at life and obtaining desires.

Murphy wrote more than 30 books. His most famous work, The Power of Your Subconscious Mind, was first published in 1963. It became an immediate bestseller and sold millions of copies worldwide.

== Personal life and death ==
In the 1950s, Murphy married, earned a PhD in psychology from the University of Southern California and started writing.

After his first wife died in 1976, he remarried to a fellow Divine Science minister who was his longstanding secretary. He moved his ministry to Laguna Hills, California, where he died in 1981. His wife, Dr. Jean Murphy, continued in this ministry for some years afterwards.

== Bibliography ==
- Murphy, Joseph (2019). This is It! The Art of Metaphysical Demonstration. New York: G & D Media. ISBN 978-1-7225-2205-6. OCLC 1090990237.
- Murphy, Joseph (1946). Wheels of Truth. Martino Publishing. ISBN 978-1578989140.
- The Perfect Answer. Church of Religious Science. 1946.
- Supreme Mastery of Fear. Xlibris. 2009. ISBN 978-1441593207.
- St. John Speaks. Los Angeles: Willing Publishing Co. 1948. ISBN 9781684225606.
- Murphy, Joseph (2010). Love is freedom. Xlibris Corporation LLC. ISBN 978-1-4500-2574-4. OCLC 710799238.
- The Twelve Powers Mystically Explained. JMW Publishing. 1948.
- Riches Are Your Right. Gildan Media LLC aka G&D Media. 1952.
- Murphy, Joseph (August 2010). The miracle of your mind. Martino. ISBN 978-1-57898-959-1. OCLC 881382578.
- The Fragrance of God (1953)
- Magic of Faith. Martino Fine Books. 2011. ISBN 978-1888262674.
- Murphy, Joseph (May 2010). The meaning of reincarnation. Martino Fine Books. ISBN 978-1-57898-912-6. OCLC 881383072.
- Murphy, Joseph (2010). Believe In Yourself. Bertrams Print On Demand. ISBN 978-1-4653-2909-7. OCLC 1124417108.
- Murphy, Joseph. How to Attract Money. ISBN 9789562913690.
- Murphy, Joseph (December 2010). Traveling with God. ISBN 978-1-891396-44-1. OCLC 1079366942.
- Peace within Yourself: The Meaning of the Book of John: The Meaning of the Book of John. Gildan Media LLC aka G&D Media. 10 April 2019. ISBN 978-1-7225-2233-9.
- Murphy, Joseph (15 April 2019). Prayer is the answer. ISBN 978-1-7225-2235-3. OCLC 1099253536.
- Murphy, Joseph (May 2010). How to use your healing power. ISBN 978-1-57898-910-2. OCLC 881327502.
- Murphy, Joseph (1958). Quiet moments with God. Marina del Rey, Calif.: DeVorss & Co. ISBN 0-87516-276-2. OCLC 14348360.
- Pray Your Way Through It. Gildan Media LLC aka G&D Media. 10 April 2019. ISBN 978-1-7225-2234-6.
- Murphy, Joseph (2010). Healing Power of Love. Bertrams Print On Demand. ISBN 978-1-4653-2903-5. OCLC 1124491240.
- Murphy, Joseph (2019). Stay Young Forever. New York: G & D Media. ISBN 978-1-7225-2238-4. OCLC 1100021244.
- Murphy, Joseph (November 2009). Mental poisons and their antidotes. ISBN 978-1-4415-7939-3. OCLC 868904647.
- How to Pray with a Deck of Cards. DeVorss. 1958. ISBN 978-0-87516-335-2.
- Murphy, Joseph; Pratt, Sean. Living Without Strain : Dr. Joseph Murphy LIVE!. Rego Park. ISBN 978-1-4690-6466-6. OCLC 1192471766.
- Murphy, Joseph (18 January 2010). Techniques in Prayer Therapy. Bertrams Print On Demand. ISBN 978-1-4653-2907-3. OCLC 1124378189.
- Murphy, Joseph (2010). Nuclear Religion. Bertrams Print On Demand. ISBN 978-1-4653-2906-6. OCLC 1124436433.
- Lord Teach Us to Pray (is the 2nd chapter of Traveling With God) (1962)
- Murphy, Joseph (2019). Why Did This Happen to Me?. New York: G & D Media. ISBN 978-1-7225-2244-5. OCLC 1100027990.
- Murphy, Joseph; McMahan, Ian (2000). The power of your subconscious mind : one of the most powerful self-help guides ever written!. Paramus, NJ: Reward Books. ISBN 0-7352-0168-4. OCLC 43227434.
- Murphy, Joseph (1964). The miracle of mind dynamics : a new way to triumphant living. New York, N.Y.: Reward Books. ISBN 0-13-585398-2. OCLC 52489851.
- Murphy, Joseph; McMahan, Ian (2001). The amazing laws of cosmic mind power (Rev. & expanded ed.). Paramus, NJ: Reward Books. ISBN 0-7352-0220-6. OCLC 45835546.
- Murphy, Joseph (1966). Your infinite power to be rich. Englewood Cliffs, NJ: Prentice Hall. ISBN 1-101-66615-3. OCLC 949755046.
- Murphy, Joseph (2017). Cosmic Power Within You. New York, NY: Penguin Publishing Group. ISBN 978-1-101-99344-6. OCLC 970389335.
- Murphy, Joseph (1996). Infinite power for richer living. Marina del Rey, CA: De Vorss. ISBN 0875166946. OCLC 1035665839.
- Murphy, Joseph; Irving, Kenneth (2000). Secrets of the I Ching: Get what you want in every situation using the classic Book of Changes. Paramus, NJ: Reward Books. ISBN 978-1-101-17200-1. OCLC 649707700.
- Murphy, Joseph (1971). Psychic perception: the magic of extrasensory power. Parker Publishing Company. ISBN 0-13-732073-6. OCLC 210823.
- Murphy, Joseph (1972). Miracle power for infinite riches. West Nyack, N.Y.: Parker Pub. Co. ISBN 0-13-585638-8. OCLC 388653.
- Murphy, Joseph (1973). Telepsychics: the magic power of perfect living. West Nyack, N.Y.: Parker Pub. Co. ISBN 0-13-902387-9. OCLC 622595.
- Murphy, Joseph (7 February 2017). The cosmic energizer: miracle power of the universe. Penguin. ISBN 978-1-101-99345-3. OCLC 961098690.
- Murphy, Joseph (1976). Great Bible truths for human problems. Marina del Rey, Calif.: DeVorss. ISBN 0-87516-214-2. OCLC 3004087.
- Murphy, Joseph (1977). Within you is the power: (around the world with Dr. Murphy). Marina del Ray, Calif.: DeVorss. ISBN 0-87516-247-9. OCLC 4499866.
- Murphy, Joseph (1979). Songs of God : an interpretation of my favorite psalms. Marina del Rey, Calif.: DeVorss. ISBN 0-87516-387-4. OCLC 6446541.
- Murphy, Joseph (1980). How to use the laws of mind. Marina del Rey, Calif.: DeVorss. ISBN 0-87516-426-9. OCLC 10725946.
- Murphy, Joseph (1982). These truths can change your life. Marina del Rey, Calif.: DeVorss. ISBN 0-87516-476-5. OCLC 10533691.
- Murphy, Joseph (1987). Collected essays of Joseph Murphy. Marina del Rey, CA: DeVorss & Co. ISBN 0-87516-592-3. OCLC 18323174.

== See also ==
- Charles F. Haanel
- Napoleon Hill
- Uell Stanley Andersen
- Wallace Wattles
