= Tom Butler-Bowdon =

Australian writer

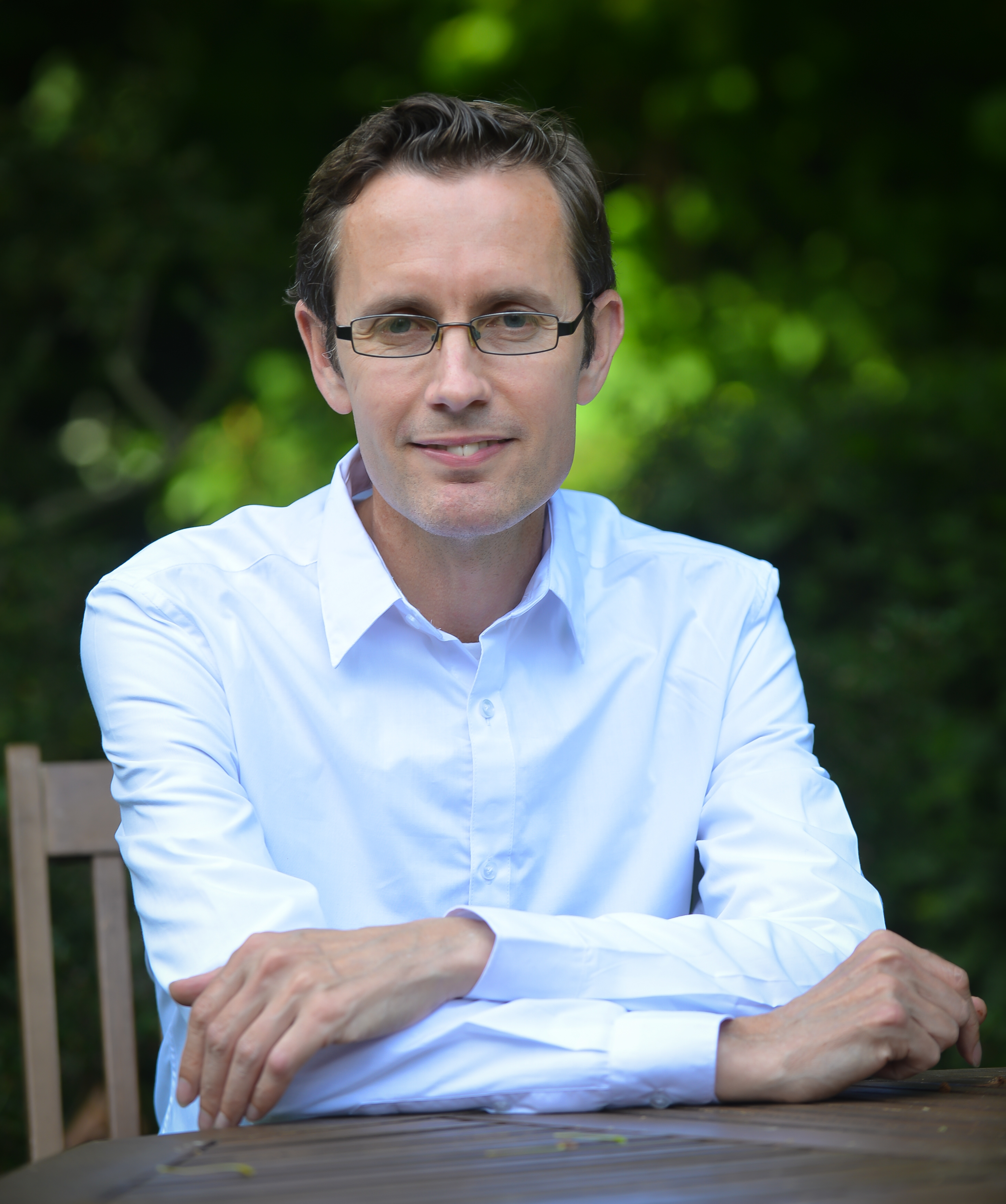
- Tom Butler-Bowdon in 2017
- Born: 1967 (age 58–59)
- Occupation: non-fiction author
- Period: 2003—present
- Subject: Self-help; Psychology; Philosophy; Politics; Economics; Business
- Notable works: The 50 Classics series
- Notable awards: Benjamin Franklin Award 2004 Psychology/Self-help; Axiom Business Book Awards 2018 Business Reference

Website
- www.butler-bowdon.com

Tom Butler-Bowdon (/ˈboʊdən/; born 1967) is a non-fiction author based in Oxford, England.

== Early life ==
Butler-Bowdon was born in Adelaide. He graduated from the University of Sydney (BA Hons, Government and History) and the London School of Economics (MSc Politics of the World Economy).

== Career ==
Butler-Bowdon is most notable for the 50 Classics series of books, which provide commentaries on key writings in personal development, psychology, philosophy and economics.

The series is published in English by Nicholas Brealey Publishing, and has been translated into 23 languages.

Referring to his earlier work on the personal development literature, Butler-Bowdon was described by USA Today as "a true scholar of this type of literature". His 50 Self-Help Classics won the 2004 Benjamin Franklin Award (US) for the Psychology/Self-Help category.

Butler-Bowdon's "50 Economics Classics: The Greatest Books Distilled" was awarded a silver medal in the 2018 Axiom Business Book Awards, in the Business Reference category.

In a 2016 interview, Butler-Bowdon described the thinking behind his 50 Classics books:

"I feel my job is to mine the often transformative information in books and bring it to a bigger audience. Most people only have the time to read a few books a year, but just a single important insight could put them on the path to something great. What drives me is the idea that at some point in the future, the average person will possess much more knowledge than what is acceptable now. The possession of knowledge on its own doesn't automatically translate into success, but what it does do is provide more references against which to check new information. For instance, it is easy to get swayed by some new idea or movement on social media or television, but if you have some grounding in history or economics, you will be able to say, "This idea has come around before, and it didn't work". What has been shown to work is x, y or z."

Author Bruce Rosenstein described Butler-Bowdon as "a curator extraordinaire, and unerringly determines the appropriate books to cover, which is far from an easy task.".

Butler-Bowdon is also Series Editor for the Capstone Classics series published by Wiley & Sons (Europe). Within this series he has provided critical introductions to Think and Grow Rich, The Science of Getting Rich, Sun Tzu's Art of War, Machiavelli's The Prince, Adam Smith's Wealth of Nations, Lao Tzu's Tao Te Ching, Plato's The Republic, Kahlil Gibran's The Prophet, and Florence Scovel Shinn's The Game of Life.

He is the author of a motivational work, Think Long: Why It's Never Too Late To Be Great, Virgin, published April 2012.

== Bibliography ==
50 Classics series

- Butler-Bowdon, Tom (2003) 50 Self-Help Classics: 50 Inspirational Books to Transform Your Life. London & Boston: Nicholas Brealey, pp. 288. ISBN 978-1-85788-323-7.
- Butler-Bowdon, Tom (2004). 50 Success Classics: Winning Wisdom for Work and Life from 50 Landmark Books. London & Boston: Nicholas Brealey, pp. 300. ISBN 978-1-85788-333-6.
- Butler-Bowdon, Tom (2005). 50 Spiritual Classics: Timeless Wisdom From 50 Great Books on Inner Discovery, Enlightenment and Purpose. London & Boston: Nicholas Brealey, pp. 300. ISBN 978-1-85788-349-7.
- Butler-Bowdon, Tom (2007). 50 Psychology Classics: Who We Are, How We Think, What We Do; Insight and Inspiration From 50 Key Books. London & Boston: Nicholas Brealey, pp. 324. ISBN 978-1-85788-386-2.
- Butler-Bowdon, Tom (2008). 50 Prosperity Classics: Attract It, Create It, Manage It, Share It: Wisdom From the Most Valuable Books on Wealth Creation and Abundance. London & Boston: Nicholas Brealey, pp. 312. ISBN 978-1-85788-504-0.
- Butler-Bowdon, Tom (2013). 50 Philosophy Classics: Thinking, Being, Acting, Seeing – Profound Insights and Powerful Thinking from Fifty Key Books. London & Boston: Nicholas Brealey, pp. ISBN 978-1857885965.
- Butler-Bowdon, Tom (2016). 50 Politics Classics: Freedom, Equality, Power. London & Boston: Nicholas Brealey, pp. ISBN 978-1857886290.
- Butler-Bowdon, Tom (2017). 50 Economics Classics: Your Shortcut to the Most Important Ideas on Capitalism, Finance, and the Global Economy. Nicholas Brealey, pp. 386 ISBN 978-1857886733.
- Butler-Bowdon, Tom (2018). 50 Business Classics: Your shortcut to the most important ideas on innovation, management and strategy. Nicholas Brealey ISBN 1857886755

Capstone Classics series

- Butler-Bowdon, Tom (2009). Introduction to Think and Grow Rich: The Original Classic, Napoleon Hill. London: Capstone (Wiley). ISBN 978-1-906465-59-9.
- Butler-Bowdon, Tom (2010). Introduction to The Science of Getting Rich: The Original Classic, Wallace Wattles. London: Capstone (Wiley). ISBN 978-0-85708-008-0.
- Butler-Bowdon, Tom (2010). Introduction to The Art of War: The Ancient Classic, Sun Tzu. London: Capstone (Wiley). ISBN 978-0-85708-009-7.
- Butler-Bowdon, Tom (2010). Introduction to The Prince: The Original Classic, Niccolò Machiavelli. London: Capstone (Wiley). ISBN 978-0-85708-078-3.
- Butler-Bowdon, Tom (2010). Introduction to and abridgment of The Wealth of Nations: The Economics Classic, Adam Smith. London: Capstone (Wiley). ISBN 978-0-85708-077-6.
- Butler-Bowdon, Tom (2012). Introduction to The Tao Te Ching: The Ancient Classic, Lao Tzu. London: Capstone (Wiley). ISBN 978-0-85708-311-1.
- Butler-Bowdon, Tom (2012). Introduction to The Republic: The Influential Classic, Plato. London: Capstone (Wiley). ISBN 978-0-85708-313-5.
- Butler-Bowdon, Tom (2020). Introduction to The Prophet: The Spiritual Classic, Kahlil Gibran. London: Capstone (Wiley). ISBN 978-0857088550.
- Butler-Bowdon, Tom (2020). Introduction to The Game of Life and How to Play It: The Self-Help Classic, Florence Scovel Shinn. London: Capstone (Wiley). ISBN 978-0857088406.

Other

- Butler-Bowdon, Tom (2012). Think Long: Why It's Never Too Late To Be Great. London: Virgin/Random House. ASIN B007AGAU16.
