= Neville Goddard =

Barbadian writer

Neville Lancelot Goddard
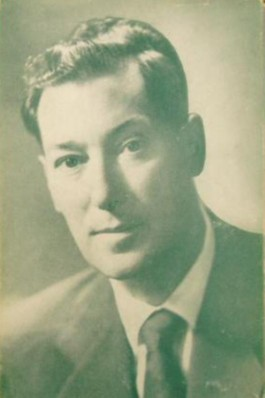
- Goddard c. 1939
- Born: February 19, 1905; Saint Michael, Barbados, British West Indies
- Died: October 1, 1972 (aged 67); West Hollywood, California, US
- Resting place: Saint Michael, Barbados
- Children: Joseph Neville Goddard, Victoria Goddard
- Writing career
- Subjects: Self-help, Bible exegesis

Neville Lancelot Goddard (February 19, 1905 – October 1, 1972) was a Barbadian writer, speaker and mystic in the New Thought movement. He grew up in Barbados and moved to the United States as a young adult. He taught self-help methods for meditation, self-hypnosis and manifestation. He authored 14 books and delivered over 300 lectures.

== Early life ==
Neville Lancelot Goddard was born in Fontabelle, Saint Michael, Barbados, on February 19, 1905, to Joseph Nathaniel Goddard, a merchant, and Wilhelmina Goddard (née Hinkson). He was the fourth of ten children, and older brother to cricketer and businessman John Goddard. At age 17, Goddard emigrated to New York City in 1922 to study drama and began his theatrical career as a dancer at the Hippodrome in New York City in 1925.

Between 1929 and 1936, Goddard was mentored by a teacher he called Abdullah. In 1929, his "Religion of Love" ministry was featured in an exposé by Harry Houdini's lead investigator Rose Mackenberg, who published an ordination certificate signed by Abdoullah. During this period, Abdoullah was a prominent figure in the "Three-Fold Movement" (Fellowship of Faiths), representing Islam on panels alongside Paramahansa Yogananda and Rabbi Stephen S. Wise. By 1928, he had established a study center on 72nd Street in New York, where he taught Kabbalah, Hebrew, and esoteric Bible interpretation to Goddard and Joseph Murphy, the latter of whom also acknowledged Abdoullah as his primary teacher.

In 1942, Goddard was drafted into the army and stationed at Camp Polk, Louisiana, in the 11th Armored Division. After serving 9 months, he was granted an honorable discharge from his Battalion Commanding Officer Colonel Theodore Bilbough Jr. After this brief stint in the Army he was naturalized as a United States citizen, having been a British citizen.

== Career ==
Goddard began his theatrical career as a dancer in 1925 at the Hippodrome. By the mid-1920s, he was an established performer in the professional act "Amerique and Neville," headlining vaudeville venues such as the Palace Theatre and Loew's Rochester Theater. Theatrical critics and newspapers remarked on his striking physical resemblance to silent film star Rudolph Valentino.

In 1925, Goddard sailed for England with his dancing partner to perform at Ciro's in London, as well as the Winter Garden in Berlin and the Ambassador in Paris. During this international tour, he developed an interest in metaphysics and psychical research after meeting Arthur Begbie, a Scotsman who introduced him to spiritualistic seances. Following the onset of the Great Depression, he concluded his professional dancing career in 1929 and shifted his focus toward the study of mysticism.

Upon returning to New York, Goddard became associated with Max Heindel's Rosicrucian Fellowship and may have also met Harvey Spencer Lewis: in a bond fraud investigation and lawsuit against Lewis, Goddard said, "I knew him when he sold stocks that did not exist, and there is no transforming power in death. He is still selling stocks that do not exist! And you ask me to read this book? I wouldn’t trust him as far as I could throw him. I am not a strong man today, and he weighed . . when he died . . over two hundred pounds, so you can see how far I would trust him". Goddard began his public lectures in February 1938 at the Old Actor's Church.

During the 1940s and early 1950s, Goddard traveled throughout the United States, holding a lecture series at The Town Hall in New York and various venues in San Francisco.

In the mid-1950s, Goddard hosted a television series titled Neville on KTTV Channel 11 in Los Angeles, which local media described as "something new and provocative". The program consisted of 26 half-hour segments airing on Sunday afternoons at 1:00 PM, where Goddard spoke extemporaneously on biblical esotericism while seated at a desk. Following a single initial telecast that generated 5,000 letters from viewers, the station secured Goddard for a full series of talks.

Goddard also made frequent appearances on The Joe Pyne Show between 1965 and 1967. According to contemporary accounts, he was noted for his ability to recite and interpret the Bible in original Greek and Hebrew from memory, often engaging in debates with fundamentalist theologians without the use of a physical text.

== Teachings ==
Goddard's philosophy centers on the power of the "Human Imagination," which he identified as the divine spark or "God" described in religious texts. He taught that the external world is a projection of an individual's internal mental state, a concept often summarized by his phrase "everyone is you pushed out."

Goddard's primary method for manifestation was the "Law of Assumption." He argued that to change one's circumstances, one must "assume the feeling of the wish fulfilled" where the individual must mentally and emotionally inhabit the state of already possessing what is desired. He emphasized that "an assumption, though false, if persisted in, will harden into fact." Unlike other New Thought teachers who focused on willpower, Goddard emphasized the use of a "State Akin To Sleep" (SATS), a drowsy, meditative, hypnagogic state used to impress the subconscious mind with a specific sensory image of a desired outcome.

Goddard viewed the Bible not as a historical record, but as a psychological drama taking place in the individual human consciousness. He interpreted biblical figures as personifications of different states of mind. For example, he taught that Jesus Christ is a symbol for the human imagination, and the crucifixion represents the spirit's "burial" within the human body, from which it must eventually awaken.

In the later years of his career, Goddard introduced a concept he called "The Promise." He claimed to have experienced a series of mystical visions that revealed the ultimate destiny of humanity: the realization that the individual is actually God. He taught that after achieving "The Law" (using imagination for earthly success), a person would eventually experience a spiritual birth that confirms their identity as the Creator, a process he described as the "resurrection of the Christ" within the individual.

== Legacy ==
Jonathan L. Walton has contended that Frederick Eikerenkoetter, best known as Reverend Ike, in particular adopted theories and teachings rooted in Goddard's ideas. Rhonda Byrne and Wayne Dyer have noted that Goddard shaped their views. Margaret Runyan Castaneda, ex-wife and later biographer of Carlos Castaneda, was interested in Goddard's work and introduced Castaneda to Goddard's ideas.

American teacher and mystic Arunachala Ramana credited Goddard's lectures at the Wilshire Ebell Theatre and books such as Your Faith Is Your Fortune as primary factors in his own spiritual awakening in 1973.

== Personal life ==
Goddard married Mildrid Mary Hughes in 1923. He had one child with Hughes, a son in 1924.

In 1942, Goddard married Catherine Willa Van Schmus. They had a daughter born on June 28, 1942.

== Death ==
Goddard died on October 1, 1972 from an esophageal rupture. In 2022, historian Mitch Horowitz corrected the record of Neville's death, previously misattributed to a heart attack; the author's death certificate cites the esophageal rupture. He had been a resident of Los Angeles for roughly 20 years.

== Works ==
- At Your Command (1939; Goddard Publications)
- Your Faith Is Your Fortune (1941; Goddard Publications)
- Freedom for All—A Practical Application of the Bible (1942; Goddard Publications)
- Feeling Is the Secret (1944; Goddard Publications)
- Prayer—The Art of Believing (1946; Goddard Publications)
- Out of This World (1949; Goddard Publications)
- The Power of Awareness (1952; unknown)
- The Creative Use of Imagination (1952; Goddard Publications)
- Awakened Imagination (1954; DeVorss & Company)
- Seedtime and Harvest (1956; DeVorss & Company)
- I Know My Father (1960; DeVorss & Company)
- The Law and the Promise (1961; DeVorss & Company)
- He Breaks the Shell (1964; DeVorss & Company)
- Resurrection (1966; DeVorss & Company)
