= Cosmic ordering =

Type of positive thinking

Cosmic ordering is a type of positive thinking proposed by Bärbel Mohr, who believed that a person can simply write down their wish list and wait for it to become reality. She first outlined her own version in her own magazine called Sonnenwind (Solar Wind), and then expanded these ideas into a 2001 book called The Cosmic Ordering Service: A Guide to Realising Your Dreams.

In the United Kingdom, disc jockey and TV game show host Noel Edmonds has become the main media promoter of Mohr's work.

== Exponents ==
Noel Edmonds, the British television host, became interested in the subject after being introduced to The Cosmic Ordering Service by his reflexologist. After having not worked on television since the end of his BBC TV show Noel's House Party in 1999, one of Edmonds' wishes was for a new challenge. Later he was offered the chance to return to television to work on Deal or No Deal. Edmonds later went on to write his own book titled Positively Happy: Cosmic Ways to Change Your Life.

== Criticism ==
Cosmic ordering has been criticised as "nonsense" by Carl Cooper. He describes it as goal setting dressed up in spiritual language. He also distinguishes cosmic ordering from intercessory prayer, noting that prayer is not "divine room service".

Cosmic ordering is satirized as "space-star ordering" in the "Something Happened" episode (Season 4, Episode 3) of The IT Crowd. In the episode, Douglas Reynholm joins the "Spaceologists" and makes wishes to the stars for what he wants. His wishes for a helicopter and the ability to apply tattoos come true after he buys himself a helicopter and a tattoo book, while his wish to have a robot hand comes true when his self-inked helicopter tattoo becomes infected and leads to the amputation of his hand. Douglas uses the successful fulfillment of his wishes to try to convince the IT team to join the Spaceologists.

== Academia ==
In 2007, cosmic ordering was put forward as a solution to women's inequality in academia. Proponents advocate asking the cosmos for a promotion to help equal the playing field with men. Opponents of the concept described the approach as "scandalous" and "an opiate to dull the pain of reality".

== See also ==
- Affirmations
- Elmer Gantry
- Law of attraction
- Word of Faith
