= Orison Swett Marden =

American writer (1848–1924)

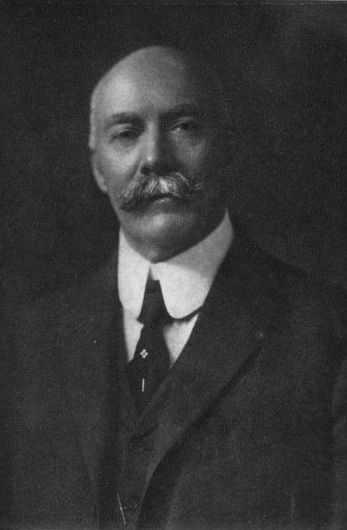
Orison Swett Marden

Dr. Orison Swett Marden (1848–1924) was an American inspirational author who wrote about achieving success in life and founded Success magazine in 1897. His writings discussed principles and virtues which Marden argued would make for a successful life through adoption of the New Thought philosophy.

His first book, Pushing to the Front (1894), became an instant best-seller. Marden later published fifty or more books and booklets, averaging two titles per year.

== Biography ==
=== The "Bound Out" Orphan ===
Marden was born 11 June 1848 in Thornton Gore, New Hampshire, to Lewis and Martha Marden. When he was three years old, his mother died at the age of 22, leaving Orison and his two sisters in the care of their father, who was a farmer, hunter, and trapper. When Orison was seven years old, his father died from injuries incurred while in the woods. Consequently, the children were shuttled from one guardian to another, with Orison working for five successive families as a "hired boy" to earn his keep.

During his early to mid-teens, Marden discovered a book entitled Self-Help by Scottish author Samuel Smiles in an attic. The book marked a turning point in his life, inspiring him to improve himself and his circumstances. Marden valued the book as if it were "worth its weight in diamonds" and virtually committed its contents to memory. He developed a deep respect and admiration for the author, whose work instilled in him a desire to inspire others as Samuel Smiles had done for him.

Marden's young manhood was marked by remarkable energy and unbroken achievement. By his early thirties, he had earned his academic degrees in science, arts, medicine and law. During his college years he supported himself by working in a hotel and afterward by becoming the owner of several hotels and a resort. He remained a successful hotel owner till his early forties (see "Timeline" for dates and other details).

=== Pushing to the Front (1894) ===
At age 44, Marden switched careers to professional authorship. It was a bold decision to which he had given careful thought, having suffered repeated business reversals and a hotel fire. His fervent sense of idealism along with an urgent sense of "now or never" in middle life spurred him onward in his new goal.

Margaret Connolly, a contemporary who worked for Marden's publishing firm in the early 1900s, describes the incident of the hotel fire, his narrow escape from death, and the loss of his original manuscript, which he later re-wrote and entitled Pushing to the Front. Marden's unwavering determination to start from scratch after this devastating loss was characteristic of the man and his writings. Connolly writes:

Over five thousand pages of manuscripts – the fruit of all the spare time he had been able to snatch from nearly fifteen crowded years of business life – had gone up in smoke...

Having nothing but his nightshirt on when he escaped from the fire, he went down the street to provide himself with necessary clothing. As soon as this had been attended to, he bought a twenty-five-cent notebook, and, while the ruins of the hotel were still smoking, began to rewrite from memory the manuscript of his dream book.

Overwhelmed and heartbroken, Marden picked himself up and started all over again. With little money, but with much time on his hands, he decided to rewrite the manuscript. He took a train for Boston, boarded an inexpensive little room, and threw himself energetically into his work. In a short time, he finished writing not only his dream book - Pushing to the Front - but also a second book, Architects of Fate. He then made three manuscripts of Pushing to the Front and submitted them to three Boston publishing firms for approval. All three firms wanted to publish the book upon a first reading of the manuscript. Ultimately, it was published by Houghton, Mifflin & Company (Boston) and presented to the public on December 1, 1894.

Pushing to the Front (1894) became the single greatest runaway classic in the history of personal development books at that time. American presidents William McKinley and Theodore Roosevelt, as well as England's Prime Minister William Gladstone, praised the book. People like Henry Ford, Thomas Edison, Harvey Firestone and J. P. Morgan cited it as inspiration. In summing up the scope and impact of Marden's first literary effort, Connolly states that "[t]wo hundred and fifty editions of Pushing to the Front have so far [in 1925] been published in this country alone. It is known and read in practically every country in the world." Marden went on to write 50 or more books and booklets during his career. Each of his books has produced dozens of famous quotes, and he is considered the base and inspiration of dozens of modern authors of self-help and motivation.

=== Success Magazine (1897) ===
Founded in 1897, Marden's Success magazine eventually grew to a circulation of about half a million subscribers. The publication had its own building and printing plant in New York and was backed by a workforce of two hundred or more employees. For his magazine, Marden wrote articles that focused on self-culture, personal development and principles of success. Other articles featured personal interviews of successful men and women. Notable public figures included the late president Teddy Roosevelt, the poet Julia Ward Howe, inventors Thomas Alva Edison and Alexander Graham Bell, and leading industrialists such as John D. Rockefeller and Andrew Carnegie. Over fifty of these interviews were later compiled into book form. The magazine is still published today by Dallas-based SUCCESS Partners.

Marden served as editor-in-chief in supervising the publication of the Consolidated Encyclopedic Library (1903, 1906, 1907), a collaborative work of nineteen volumes written for the benefit of the general public and young people in particular. He was also a regular contributor to Elizabeth Towne's New Thought magazine, Nautilus, during the first two decades of the twentieth century. During this time he served as the first president of the early New York City-based New Thought organization League for the Larger Life.

=== Timeline ===
Note: Information condensed from Margaret Connolly's The Life Story of Orison Swett Marden (1925) and Wende Marden Sinnaeve's Out of the Ashes - The Life Story of Orison Swett Marden (2004). Those marked with an asterisk are plausible approximates where no exact year was found. Events where no approximate year can be ascertained are marked (--).

- 1848 - Orison Marden is born in New Hampshire
- 1853* - Martha Marden, mother of Orison, dies at age twenty-two
- 1856 (January) - Lewis Marden, father of Orison, dies from an accident in his early thirties
- 1856-57* - Orison and his two sisters, Mary and Rose, are briefly taken into the home of their grandmother
- 1857* - Orison is "bound out" to his first home (the Glover family) by his guardian, Herod Fifield
- 1857* - Orison goes out on an errand and runs from a wildcat, fends off a bear and evades a catamount
- 1858* - Orison is removed from the Glover family and placed in his second home (Mr and Mrs Strong, a Baptist couple)
- 1862* - Orison is transferred to his third home (Mr and Mrs Chapman)
- 1864* - After two years at the Chapman home, Orison runs away to serve a new master at his fourth home (the Foss family)
- (--) In his early to mid-teens, Orison discovers Samuel Smiles' book, Self-Help, in a dilapidated condition in an attic
- (--) Orison takes residence on the land of a neighboring farmer, which probably became his fifth home
- (--) Attends Colby Academy, a preparatory school in New London, New Hampshire
- (--) Works for General Luther McCutchins during the summer where he earns his board for Colby Academy
- (--) Teaches in a schoolhouse attended by unruly boys
- (--) Attends New Hampton Institute, New Hampshire
- (--) Secures a position as waiter at the Crawford House hotel during the summer
- 1873-74* - Attends Andover Theological Seminary in Massachusetts to become a clergyman.
- 1874* - Abandons his studies for the ministry, on the conviction that he was better suited for something else.
- 1877* - Graduates Bachelor of Arts (B.A.), Boston University
- 1877 - Becomes second assistant clerk at Ocean View Hotel, Block Island, Rhode Island, during the summer season after graduation.
- 1877 - Promoted to hotel manager at Ocean View hotel by the end of the summer season.
- (--) Graduates Bachelor of Science (B.S.), Boston University
- 1879 - Graduates Bachelor of Oratory (possible degree for B.O., see footnote) with honors, Boston University
- 1879 - Graduates Master of Arts (A.M.), Boston University
- 1881 - Graduates Doctor of Medicine (M.D.), Harvard Medical School
- 1882 - Graduates Bachelor of Laws (LL.B.), Boston University Law School
- 1882 - Sails for Europe (number of months is not given) and visits France, Germany, Italy, Austria, Hungary, Great Britain and Ireland.
- (--) Becomes owner of the Hotel Manisses, Block Island
- (--) Becomes proprietor of the Palmer House, Grand Island, Nebraska
- (--) Becomes proprietor of Midway Hotel, Kearney, Nebraska
- (--) Elected as President of the Board of Trade in Kearney, Nebraska
- (--) Becomes treasurer of the Fort George Island Company in Florida
- 1892 - Helps open a new hotel in South Dakota; manages the hotel, fits it up and buys furniture for it.
- 1893* - Marden's hotel in Kearney, Nebraska, burns down along with his original manuscript for Pushing to the Front.
- 1893 - After business reversals, Marden was again working as a hotel manager, in Chicago, during the time that the World's Columbian Exposition was attracting visitors to that city from all over the world.
- 1894* - Resolves to devote his efforts to professional authorship
- 1894* - Takes a train for Boston and boards a cheap room where he writes Pushing to the Front and Architects of Fate
- 1894 - Publishes Pushing to the Front
- 1897 - Success magazine launched in Boston
- (--) Success publishing firm becomes established in New York
- 1903 - At age 55 marries Clair Evans of Louisville, Kentucky. They have three children - Orison Jr., Mary Newell and Laura Fletcher.
- 1905* - Buys a farm in Glen Cove, Long Island, soon after marriage, which serves as the homeplace of Dr. Marden and his family.
- 1912* - Success publishing firm suffers from financial loss and collapses
- 1917 (or 1918) - Frederick C. Lowrey, a prominent Chicago businessman, helps Marden revive the Success publishing firm
- 1918 (January) - The first issue of the new Success magazine appears
- 1924 (January 26) - Honored by his staff of the Success firm in New York who see him for the last time
- 1924 (March 10) - Dr. Marden dies at age 75

== Philosophy and style ==
=== Philosophy ===
In addition to Samuel Smiles, Marden cited as influences on his thinking the works of Oliver Wendell Holmes Sr. and Ralph Waldo Emerson, both of whom were influential forerunners of what, by the 1890s, was called the New Thought Movement.

Like many proponents of the New Thought philosophy, Marden believed that our thoughts influence our lives and our life circumstances. Writing, "We make the world we live in and shape our own environment." Yet although he is best known for his books on financial success, he always emphasized that this would come as a result of cultivating one's personal development: "The golden opportunity you are seeking is in yourself. It is not in your environment; it is not in luck or chance, or the help of others; it is in yourself alone."

=== Literary style ===
Marden wrote in an energetic and readable style that used simple, yet lucid vocabulary. He favoured the "bold headline" approach and presented his ideas with brevity, directness and clarity. He also carried a distinctive American tone and syntax that modern readers may easily relate to.

Among the many subjects to be found in his writings, perhaps his strongest were in business, salesmanship and the art of balanced living. Other interests include literature, history, philosophy, biography, fine art, education, psychology, and physical health. Like Samuel Smiles, he expounded upon many of the virtues that make up success, such as self-reliance, perseverance, and hard work. His writings breathe a spirit of "lofty austerity" and focus on themes of adversity and triumph, defeat and victory, failure and success.”

Marden often kept his writings simple, concrete, and grounded in reality. Indeed, he advises young writers to "Live, Then Write" and to "Keep Close to Life." Yet along with this simplicity, his writings also displayed a remarkable talent for rhetorical flight. Marden made frequent use of metaphors and similes in conveying ethical principles and moral lessons. Objects or scenes observable in nature such as rocks, marbles, streams, trees, snows, and tempests imparted a sublime, poetic depth to his writing:

The frost, the snows, the tempests, the lightnings, are the rough teachers that bring the tiny acorn to the sturdy oak...Obstacles, hardships are the chisel and mallet which shape the strong life into beauty.

== Bibliography ==
Inspirational books

- Pushing to the Front (1894, 1911)
- Architects of Fate (or, Rising in the World; or, Steps to Success and Power) (1895)
- How to Succeed (or, Stepping-Stones to Fame and Fortune) (1896)
- Success (Ideas, Helps and Examples for All Desiring to Make the Most of Life) (1897)
- The Secret of Achievement (1898)
- Stepping Stones (Essays for Everyday Living) (1902)
- The Making of a Man (1905)
- Every Man a King (or, Might over Mind) (1906)
- The Optimistic Life (or, in The Cheering Up Business) (1907)
- He Can Who Thinks He Can (1909)
- Peace, Power, and Plenty (1909)
- Be Good to Yourself (1910)
- Getting On (1910)
- The Miracle of Right Thought (1910)
- Self-Investment (1911)
- Everybody Ahead (or, Getting the Most Out of Life) (1916)
- The Victorious Attitude (1916)
- How to Get What You Want (1917)
- Joys of Living (or, Living Today in the Here and Now) (1917)
- Making Life a Masterpiece (1917)
- Love's Way (1918)
- You Can, But Will You? (1920)
- Prosperity - How to Attract It (1922)
- Making Yourself (1923)
- Masterful Personality (1921)

Books on health

- Keeping Fit (1914)
- The Conquest of Worry (1924)
- Making Friends with Our Nerves (1925)

Biographical anecdotes for children

- Winning Out (A Book for Young People on Character Building by Habit Forming) (1900)
- Eclectic School Readings (Stories from Life, a Book for Young People) (1909)

Interviews of successful people

- How They Succeeded (Life Stories of Successful Men Told by Themselves) (1901)
- Talks with Great Workers (Interviews with Men that Changed America) (1901)
- Little Visits with Great Americans (or, Success, Ideals, and How to Attain Them) (1905)

Business and efficiency-type books

- Choosing a Career (1905)<
- The Young Man Entering Business (1907)
- The Progressive Business Man (1913)
- Training for Efficiency (1913)
- The Exceptional Employee (1913)
- Selling Things (1916)
- Success Fundamentals (1920)
- How to Choose Your Career (or, Round Pegs in Square Holes) (1922)

Books on love, family and home life

- Uplift Book of Child Culture (1913). Only the first three chapters were written by Marden.
- The Crime of Silence (1915)
- Woman and the Home (1915)

Books on general education

- The Consolidated Encyclopedic Library. In nineteen volumes. (1903, 1906, 1907)

Booklets

- Friendship (1897)
- Character: The Grandest Thing in the World (1899)
- Cheerfulness as a Life Power (1899)
- Tact, or Common Sense (1899)
- Good Manners - A Passport to Success. Co-authored with Abner Bayley. (1900)
- The Hour of Opportunity (1900)
- Economy (The Self-Denying Depositor and Prudent Paymaster at the Bank of Thrift) (1901)
- An Iron Will (1901)
- Precepts on Economy (1902)
- The Cigarette (1906)
- The Power of Personality. Written with the assistance of Margaret Connolly. (1906)
- Success Nuggets (1906)
- Do It to a Finish (1909)
- Not the Salary but the Opportunity (1909)
- Why Grow Old? (1909)
- Thoughts About Character (1910)
- Thoughts About Good Cheer (or, Thoughts About Cheerfulness) (1910)
- Hints for Young Writers (1914)
- I Had a Friend (1914)
- How to Secure Health, Wealth, and Happiness (1916)
- The Man You Long to Be. An article printed in the Nautilus. (January, 1918)
- Thrift (1918)
- Ambition and Success (1919)
- The Law of Financial Independence (1919)
- Self-Discovery (or, Why Remain a Dwarf?) (1922)

Articles

All eleven articles listed are grouped into one Kindle eBook file from Amazon.com under the heading, "After Failure, What?" Many of these articles were probably extracted from or reprinted as separate chapters in Marden's books by the Success publishing company.

- "After Failure - What?" Success magazine, Volume 8 (1905)
- "The Excuse of No Chance." Success magazine, Volume 9 (1905)
- "Getting Away from Poverty." Success magazine, Volume 9 (1906)
- "Freedom at Any Cost." Success magazine, Volume 10 (1907)
- "Don't Live This Year as if it Is Last Year." Success magazine, Volume 11 (1908)
- "Self-Improvement Through Public Speaking." Success magazine, Volume 14 (1911)
- "The Force Back of the Flesh." The Nautilus magazine, Volume 17.12 (1914–15)
- "A New Year, a New Day, a New Chance." The New Success magazine, Volume 5.1 (1921)
- "The Hundred Percent Home." The New Success magazine, Volume 5.1 (1921)
- "Which Way Are You Facing?" The New Success magazine, Volume 5.1 (1921)
- "If I Were President!" The New Success magazine, Volume 5.2 (1921)
