= Geneviève Behrend =

French writer and teacher (1881–1960)

Geneviève Behrend (1881 in Paris – 1960 in United States) was a French-born author and teacher of Mental Science, a New Thought discipline taught by Thomas Troward.

There is little known about her early life except that one of her parents was Scottish. After her husband died she traveled extensively. She studied Christian Science and met its founder Mary Baker Eddy, but ultimately left that faith. She met Abdul Baha, whose father had founded Baháʼí Faith, and he told her that she would “travel the world over seeking the truth, and when [she] had found it, would speak it out”. She later wrote in her book Your Invisible Power that she found a book of Thomas Troward's lectures.

Inspired by this, she wanted to study with Troward, but lacked the money to travel to Cornwall, England where he lived, as she was then living in New York. So every night and morning she visualized counting out twenty $1,000 bills, buying her ticket to London, travelling on the ship, and being accepted as Troward’s pupil. She also constantly affirmed to herself, “My mind is a center of Divine operations”. Then, to quote her in Your Invisible Power, "While these reflections were going on in my mind, there seemed to come up from within me the thought: 'I am all the substance there is.' Then, from another channel in my brain, the answer seemed to come, 'Of course, that's it; everything must have its beginning in mind. The 'I', the Idea, must be the only one and primary substance there is, and this means money as well as everything else.' My mind accepted this idea, and immediately all the tension of mind and body was relaxed". In about six weeks, she received the money.

From 1912 until 1914, she studied with Thomas Troward; Behrend was the only personal student he had throughout his life.

After her studies with Troward she founded a New Thought school called The School of the Builders in approximately 1915 in New York City, running it herself until 1925. She then founded another New Thought school in Los Angeles, after which she traveled throughout North America lecturing on mental science and New Thought for 35 years, as well as giving radio broadcasts.

She is quoted as an expert in the best-selling self-help book The Secret by Rhonda Byrne.

== Bibliography ==
- Your Invisible Power (1921).
- How to Live Life and Love it (1922).
- Attaining Your Heart's Desire (1929).
