= The Nautilus (magazine) =

American spiritual magazine, 1898 to 1953

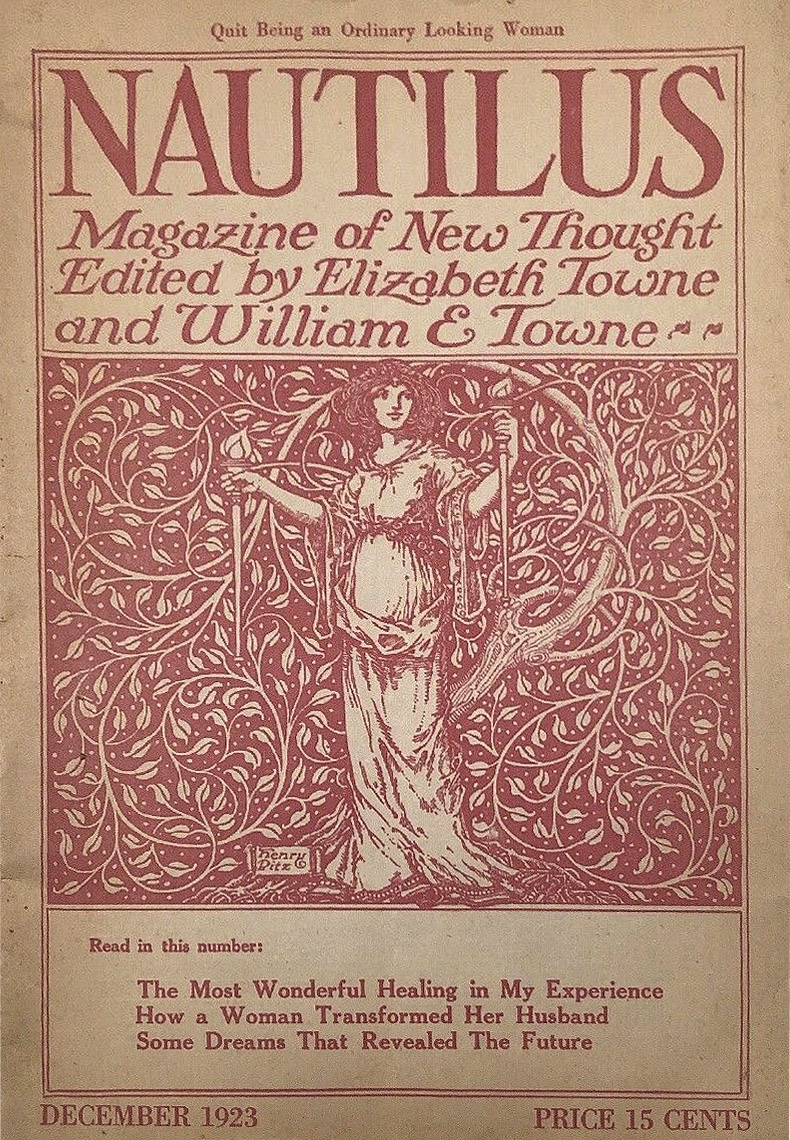
- December 1923 issue of Nautilus
- Editors: Elizabeth Towne; William E. Towne
- Categories: New Thought, metaphysics, occultism
- Frequency: Monthly
- Publisher: Elizabeth Towne Company, Inc.
- Total circulation: 90,000 (1928)
- First issue: November 1898; 127 years ago
- Final issue: August 1953
- Country: United States
- Based in: Holyoke, Massachusetts, U.S.
- Language: English

The Nautilus was a magazine of the New Thought Movement, founded in 1898 by Elizabeth Towne, in Portland, Oregon.

== History ==
The magazine was briefly published in Sioux Falls, South Dakota in 1899; however, in May 1900, Towne moved to Holyoke, Massachusetts, which became the magazine's permanent home until its discontinuation in August 1953, when Towne retired from publishing at the age of 88. Towne also published, under the "Elizabeth Towne" imprint, books consisting of material which had run in serialized form in the magazine, generally supplying introductions to the compiled works.

Authors who were published in the magazine include:

- William Walker Atkinson
- Kate Atkinson Boehme
- Jonathan Balcombe
- Grace MacGowan Cooke
- Florence Tabor Critchlow
- Paul Ellsworth
- Sinclair Lewis
- Orison Swett Marden
- Edwin Markham
- Thomas J. Shelton
- Elizabeth Towne
- William Towne
- Wallace Wattles

In 1907, writer Grace MacGowan Cooke contributed to The Nautilus. Grace authored an article titled The Spiritual Meaning of Fletcherism (1907), delving into the concept of "Fletcherism" and its spiritual implications.

During the 1912 campaign of Theodore Roosevelt, Elizabeth and her husband William were active in the national delegations of the Progressive Party, and published coverage of the movement's conventions in Chicago and Boston that year.

== External sources ==
- Elizabeth Towne Home Page
- Nautilus archives, The International Association for the Preservation of Spiritualism and Occult Periodicals (IAPSOP)
