= Prentice Mulford =

American literary humorist and author

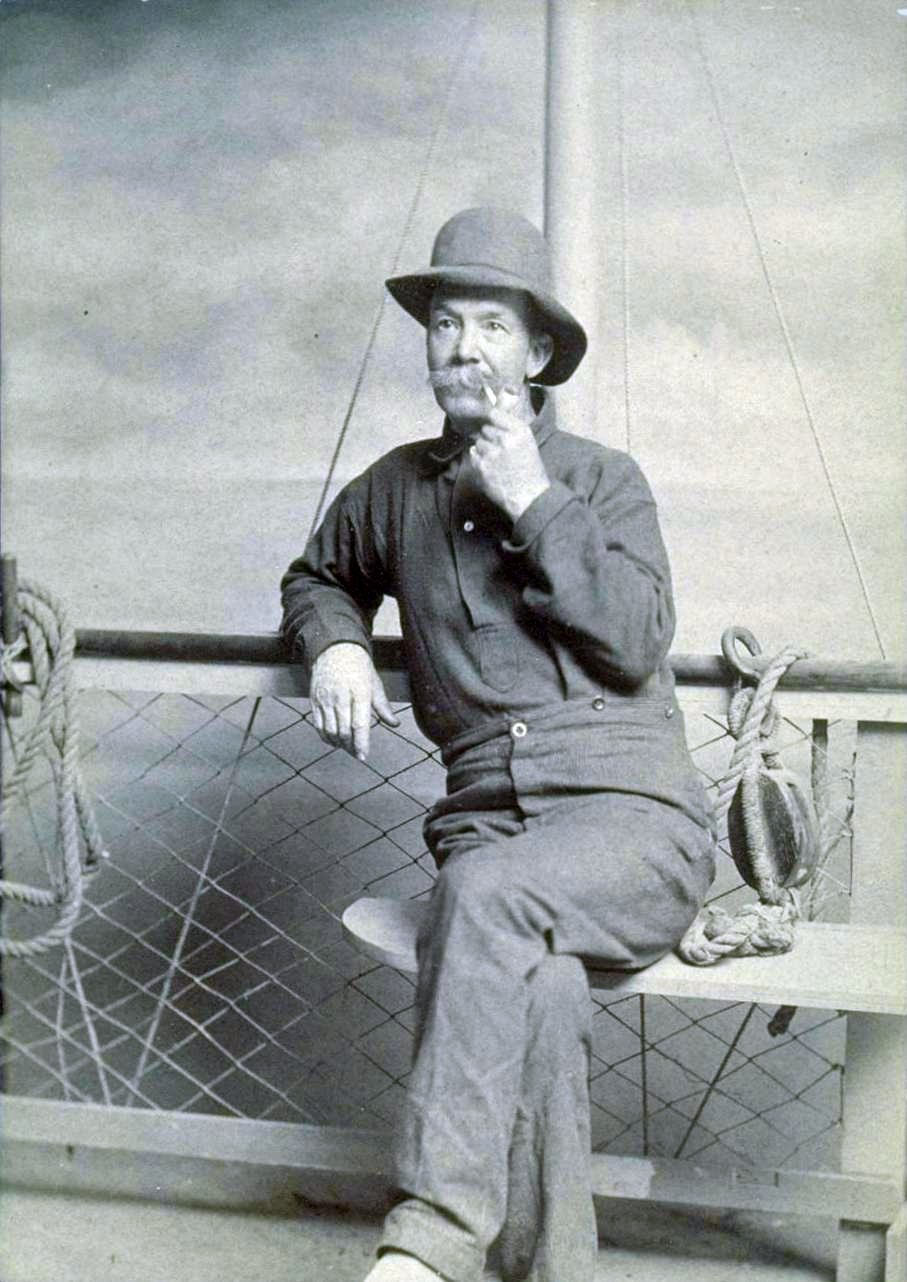
- Born: April 5, 1834; Sag Harbor, New York
- Died: c. May 30, 1891 (aged 57); Sheepshead Bay, Brooklyn
- Occupations: Literary humorist, author

Prentice Mulford (April 5, 1834 – c. May 30, 1891) was an American literary humorist and California author. In addition, he was pivotal in the development of the thought within the New Thought movement. Many of the principles that would become standard in the movement, including the Law of Attraction, were clearly laid out in his Your Forces and How to Use Them, released as a series of essays during 1886–1892.

== Biography ==
Prentice Mulford was born in Sag Harbor, New York, in 1834, and in 1856 sailed to California where he would spend the next 16 years. During this time, Mulford spent several years in mining towns, trying to find his fortune in gold, copper, or silver. After leaving the mining life, Mulford ran for a position on the California State Assembly in Sacramento. Although he was nominated, he ultimately lost the election. He returned to San Francisco and began writing for a weekly newspaper, The Golden Era. Mulford spent five years as a writer and editor for various papers and was named by many San Franciscans a "Bohemian" because of his disregard for money. Mulford states in his autobiography, "poverty argued for us possession of more brains" (Prentice Mulford's Story 130). He became known for his humorous style of writing and vivid descriptions of both mining life and life at sea. In 1872 Mulford returned to New York City, where he became known as a comic lecturer, a poet and essayist, and a columnist for The New York Daily Graphic from 1875 to 1881. Mulford was also instrumental in the founding, along with other notable writers, of the popular philosophy New Thought. Mulford's book Thoughts are Things served as a guide to this new belief system and is still popular today.

His body was found lying in a boat in Sheepshead Bay, Brooklyn, on May 30, 1891, where it had been drifting for several days. He was buried in his family's private vault in Sag Harbor, and later moved to Oakland Cemetery there.

== Partial works ==
- Thoughts are Things (1889)
- Your Forces and How to Use Them (In six volumes, published in 1888)
- The Swamp Angel, 1888
- The Gift of Understanding
- Gift of the Spirit (1904) 1st edition- with an introduction by Arthur Edward Waite
- Gift of Spirit (1917 2nd revised ed.)
- Thought Forces Essays Selected from the White Cross Library (1913)
- The God in You, 1918
- Prentice Mulford's Story: Life by Land and Sea (1889)
