= Esther Hicks =

American writer

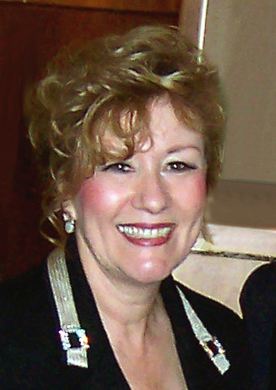
- Esther and Jerry Hicks, 2006
- Born: Esther Weaver; 1948 (age 77–78); Coalville, Utah, U.S.
- Known for: Author and public speaker for Abraham-Hicks
- Spouse: Jerry Hicks
- Children: Tracy Geer Ayers
- Website: www.abraham-hicks.com

Esther Hicks (née Weaver; born 1948) is an American motivational speaker, channeler, and author. She has co-written nine books with her husband Jerry Hicks, presented many workshops on the law of attraction with Abraham-Hicks Publications, and has also appeared in the original cut of the 2006 film The Secret. Hicks claims to channel a collective consciousness she calls "Abraham". As with other channellers, she uses a different tone of voice and accent to indicate the entity is speaking through her.

== Biography ==
Esther Weaver was born in Coalville, Utah. At age 20, she met her first husband and had one daughter from that marriage, Tracy, who works with her. In 1976, she met Jerry Hicks, then a successful Amway distributor, and they married four years later, on September 3, 1980. In his early life, Jerry Hicks had been a circus acrobat for two years in Cuba, and then, beginning in 1948, toured for 20 years as a musician, master of ceremonies, and comedian. He had been married several times before meeting Esther.

Esther's channeling experiences began in 1985, after she and Jerry read the Seth Material of channeller Jane Roberts and had a consultation with a channeller in Phoenix, where they lived.

Hicks started giving private readings in 1987 and conferences the following year, working from their estate in San Antonio and traveling from location to location in a luxury motorhome well into the 2000s. Cruises were eventually added to the road trips. Their popularity grew after Esther appeared in the 2006 DVD film The Secret. Owing to a dispute with the film's main creator, the footage does not appear in the "Extended Edition" cut. The film contained an excerpt of a 2005 cruise conference showing Hicks explaining the Law of attraction, a central concept of The Secret's mystical self-help discourse. Hicks offers video lectures, including exclusives for paying subscribers. As of January 2023, their YouTube subscriber count was 741,000, with the most popular video at 14.6 million views.

Jerry Hicks died November 18, 2011, from cancer. He was 85 years old.

== New Thought teachings ==
Hicks claims that by attuning their thoughts to the "frequency" of the universe, people will receive whatever they desire. These concepts are present in older American self-help works of the New Thought movement, such as William Walker Atkinson's The Law of Attraction in the Thought World. An attempt by Hicks to copyright the phrase law of attraction was rejected by the United States Patent Office as it had been used by Atkinson as early as 1906. Labeling these beliefs as prosperity consciousness, Gordon Melton traces their origin in 19th century Christian Science.

As of 2013, they summarized their teachings into three universal principles.

- Law of Attraction. Thoughts "vibrate with the universe".
- Science of Deliberate Creation. Thoughts manifest reality.
- Art of Allowing.

== The Secret ==
Esther Hicks narrated and appeared in the original version of the film The Secret, as well as being a central source of the film's inspiration. The footage featuring Hicks was removed from the later "Extended Edition" after a falling-out with the film's creator Rhonda Byrne.

Differing accounts say that Hicks left the collaboration out of ideological differences with the producer or was told by Rhonda Byrne that her part would be edited out and that she would receive no royalties beyond the $500,000 already paid. Byrne argued that Hicks outlines concepts that had been previously published.

In an interview with Oprah Winfrey, Hicks said the episode left her feeling ill-treated by Byrne.

In 2007, Esther Hicks released her own popular DVD series, The Secret behind the Secret.

== Published works ==
Several of the books written by Esther and Jerry Hicks have made it to bestseller lists in the United States. Hay House Inc. published the Hicks' book, Ask and it is Given, in September 2004. Since that book they have also published The Amazing Power of Deliberate Intent (January 2006), The Law of Attraction (October 2006), The Astonishing Power of Emotions (September 2008), Money and the Law of Attraction: Learning to Attract Health, Wealth & Happiness, and The Vortex: Where the Law of Attraction Assembles All Cooperative Relationships (2009).

- A New Beginning I: Handbook for Joyous Survival, by Jerry and Esther Hicks. Published by Abraham–Hicks Publications, 5th edition, 1988.
- A New Beginning II: A Personal Handbook to Enhance your Life, Liberty and Pursuit of Happiness, by Jerry and Esther Hicks. Published by Abraham–Hicks Publications, 1991.
- Sara and the Foreverness of Friends of a Feather, by Esther and Jerry Hicks. Published by Abraham–Hicks Publications, 1995.
- Ask and it is Given: Learning to Manifest Your Desires by Esther and Jerry Hicks. Published by Hay House, 2005.
- The Amazing Power of Deliberate Intent: Living the Art of Allowing, by Esther and Jerry Hicks. Contributor Louise L. Hay. Published by Hay House, 2005.
- The Law of Attraction: The Basics of the Teachings of Abraham Esther and Jerry Hicks. Published by Hay House, 2006.
- Sara, Book 1: Sara Learns the Secret about the Law of Attraction, by Esther and Jerry Hicks. Illustrated by Caroline S. Garrett. Published by Hay House, 2007.
- Sara, Book 2: Solomon's Fine Featherless Friends, by Esther and Jerry Hicks. Illustrated by Caroline S. Garrett. Published by Hay House Inc, 2007.
- Sara, Book 3: A Talking Owl is Worth a Thousand Words!, by Esther and Jerry Hicks. Illustrated by Caroline S. Garrett. Published by Hay House Inc, 2008.
- The Astonishing Power of Emotions, by Esther and Jerry Hicks. Published by Hay House Inc, 2008.
- Money and the Law of Attraction: Learning to Attract Health, Wealth & Happiness by Esther and Jerry Hicks. Published by Hay House, 2008.
- The Vortex: Where the Law of Attraction Assembles All Cooperative Relationships by Esther and Jerry Hicks. Published by Hay House, 2009.
- Getting into the Vortex: Guided Meditations CD and User Guide by Esther and Jerry Hicks. Release date November 15, 2010. Published by Hay House, 2009.
