= Elizabeth Towne =

American magazine editor (1865–1960)

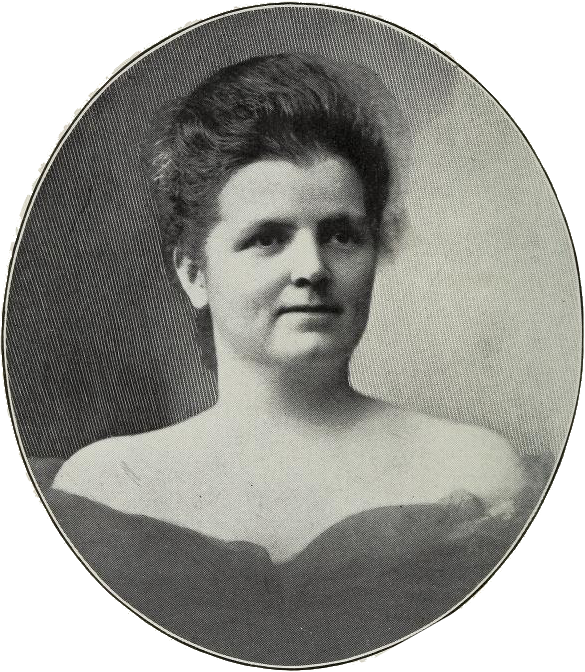
- Towne c. 1905
- Born: Elizabeth Jones; 11 May 1865; Portland, Oregon
- Died: 1 June 1960 (aged 95); Holyoke, Massachusetts
- Resting place: Springfield Cemetery, Springfield, Massachusetts
- Known for: Publisher of Nautilus, New Thought and self-help writer

Elizabeth Jones Towne (May 11, 1865 – June 1, 1960) was a writer, editor, and publisher in the New Thought and self-help movements.

== Early life ==
Elizabeth Jones was born in Oregon, the daughter of John Halsey Jones. She first married at age 14, to Joseph Holt Struble. They had two children, Catherine and Chester. They divorced in 1900. She married William E. Towne and relocated to Holyoke, Massachusetts that same year. At age 27 Elizabeth stated that she came into the experience of cosmic consciousness described by Richard M. Bucke.

== Career ==
Both Elizabeth Towne and her second husband were for many years associated with the International New Thought Alliance (INTA), and served on its board in various capacities. She served as the president of INTA in 1924.

In 1926 she ran for and successfully obtained a seat on the board of aldermen, the predecessor of Holyoke's city council. She would be the first woman to do so in Holyoke, and the first married woman to obtain a position on a board of aldermen in the state, and in 1928, while ultimately losing to her opponents, became the first woman in the city to run for the office of mayor.

Towne was the founder and publisher of Nautilus Magazine, a journal of the New Thought movement that ran from 1898 through 1953, when she brought it to a close due to her advancing age (she was 88 years old at the time). She also operated the Elizabeth Towne Company, which published an extensive list of New Thought, metaphysical, self-help, and self-improvement books by herself and writers such as William Walker Atkinson, Kate Atkinson Boehme, Paul Ellsworth, Orison Swett Marden, Edwin Markham, Clara Chamberlain McLean, Helen Rhodes-Wallace, William Towne, and Wallace Wattles.

Towne was a smoker and practiced meditation. She was a vegetarian and in 1903 authored Just How to Cook Meals Without Meat.

In 2015, her book Just How To Wake The Solar Plexus was narrated by Hillary Hawkins and published in audiobook form.

== Influence ==
The title page of Towne's book The Life Power and How to Use it is shown in the opening sequence of the 2006 movie The Secret, and the film presents many of the ideas that she promoted, along with those of Wallace Wattles and William Walker Atkinson.

== Selected publications ==
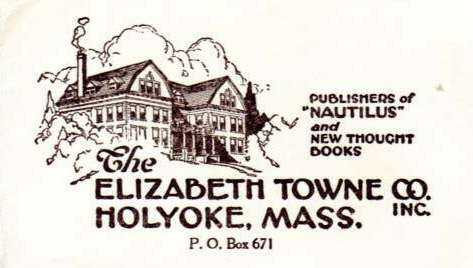
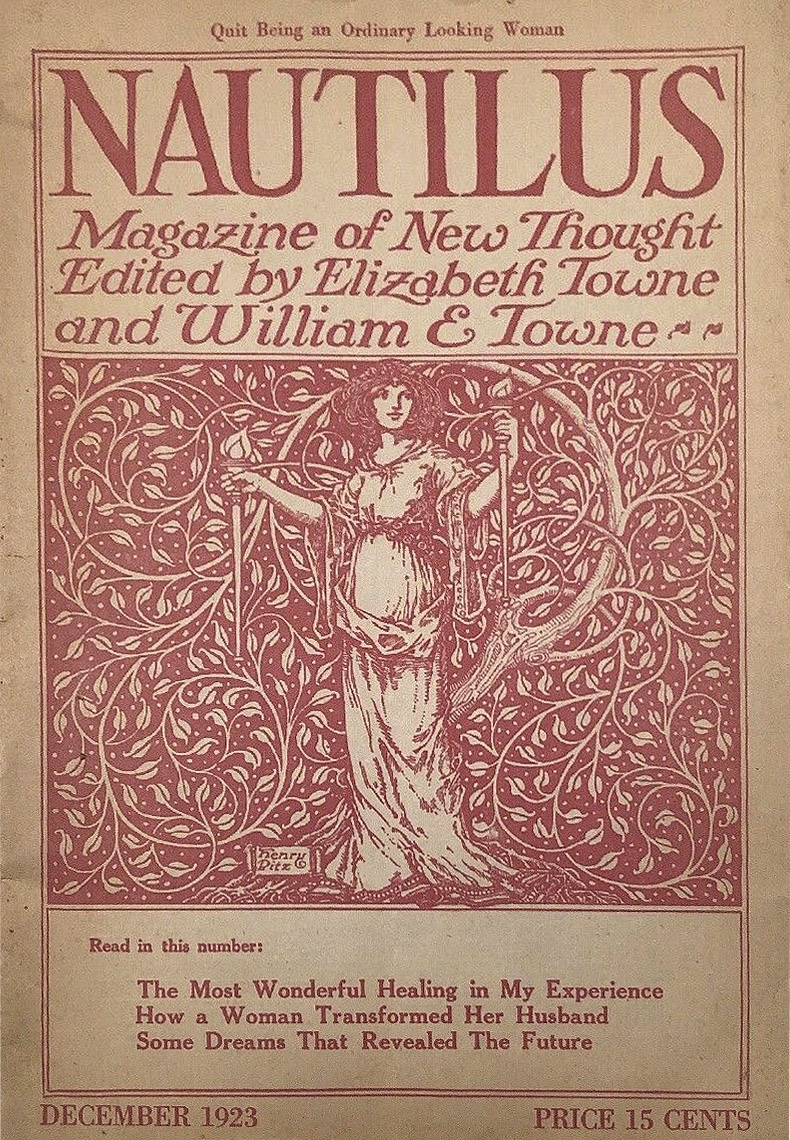
One of several variants of The Elizabeth Towne Co. logo, showing the 247 Cabot St. offices in Holyoke, today used by nonprofit The Care Center; the cover of the December 1923 issue of the Nautilus

In addition to the many articles and editorials she wrote for Nautilus Magazine during its 55-year history, books by Elizabeth Towne include:

- Experiences in Self-Healing
- Fifteen Lessons in New Thought or Lessons in Living
- Happiness And Marriage
- Health Through New Thought and Fasting (with Wallace Wattles)
- How to Grow Success (1904)
- How to Use New Thought in Home Life
- Lessons in Living
- The Life Power and How to Use It
- Joy Philosophy
- Just How to Concentrate
- Just How to Cook Meals Without Meat
- Just How to Train Children and Parents
- Just How to Wake the Solar Plexus Elizabeth Towne Co. 1906.; repr. 1926.
- Practical Methods for Self-Development: Spiritual, Mental, Physical
- You and Your Forces
- Your Character (reprinted as How to Read Character)

== See also ==
- New Thought Movement
- List of New Thought writers
