= Thomas Troward =

English author

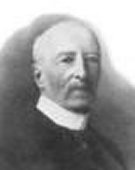
Thomas Troward

Thomas Troward (14 October 1834 – 18 May 1916) was an English author whose works influenced the New Thought Movement and mystic Christianity.

== Background ==
Troward was a divisional Judge in Punjab in British-administered India. His avocation was the study of comparative religion.

After his retirement from the judiciary in 1896, Troward set out to apply logic and a judicial weighing of evidence in the study of matters of cause and effect. The philosopher William James characterized Troward’s Edinburgh Lectures on Mental Science as "far and away the ablest statement of philosophy I have met, beautiful in its sustained clearness of thought and style, a really classic statement."

According to Alcoholics Anonymous (AA) archivist Nell Wing, early AA members were strongly encouraged to read Thomas Troward's Edinburgh Lectures on Mental Science. In the opening of the 2006 film The Secret, introductory remarks credit Troward's philosophy with inspiring the movie and its production.

Troward was a past president of the International New Thought Alliance.

Geneviève Behrend studied with Troward from 1912 until 1914; Behrend was the only personal student he had throughout his life.

Bob Proctor credited Troward's works on a number of occasions, and cited The Creative Process in the Individual as the most important in developing the persistence of an individual.

== Books ==
- Troward, T. (1909), The Edinburgh Lectures on Mental Science, New York, NY: Dodd, Mead and Company.
- Troward, T. (1909), The Doré Lectures: Being Sunday Addresses at the Doré Gallery, London, Given in Connection with the Higher Thought Centre, 10, Cheniston Gardens, Kensington, New York, NY: Dodd, Mead and Company.
- Troward, T. (1910), The Creative Process in the Individual, London: Stead, Danby and Co.
- Troward, T. (1913), Bible Mystery and Bible Meaning, New York : Goodyear Book Concern.
- Troward, T. (1913), The Years 1914 to 1923 in Bible Prophecy: Scripture Prediction of the Present War, New York, School of the Builders.
- Troward, T. (1917),The Law and the Word, New York, Robert M. McBride & Company.
- Troward, T. (1917), The Hidden Power and Other Papers on Mental Science, New York, NY: Dodd, Mead and Company.

== See also ==
- List of New Thought writers
- Geneviève Behrend
