= Charles F. Haanel =

American businessman, author (1866–1949)

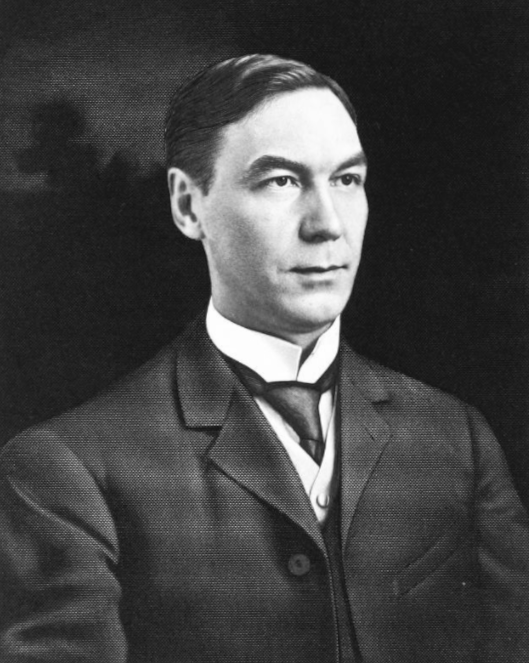
- Born: May 22, 1866; Ann Arbor, Michigan
- Died: November 27, 1949 (aged 83); University City, Missouri
- Occupations: Author, philosopher and a businessman
- Known for: New Thought and The Master Key System

Signature
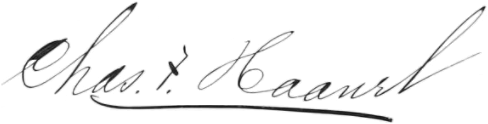

Charles Francis Haanel (May 22, 1866 – November 27, 1949) was an American author, philosopher and a businessman. He is best known for his contributions to the New Thought movement through his book The Master Key System.

== Personal life and business career ==
The Haanel family was of Swedish extraction, but had lived in Silesia, Prussia, before emigrating to Canada and thence to the United States.

In St. Louis: History of the Fourth City, the author Walter B. Stevens wrote that "Charles F. Haanel was born in Ann Arbor, Michigan, the son of Hugo and Emeline (Fox) Haanel." He was the fourth of six children. According to Stevens, "The family moved to St. Louis, Missouri when Charles was a child. His first job was as an office boy for the National Enameling & Stamping Company in St. Louis, and he worked for this firm in varying capacities for fifteen years before striking out on his own as a writer and businessman."

In 1885 he married Esther M. Smith. They had one son and two daughters. In 1891 his wife died. In 1908 he married for the second time, to Margaret Nicholson of St. Louis, whose father was W. A. Nicholson.

He was a member of the Republican Party, a Freemason and Shriner affiliated with St. Louis Keystone Lodge No.243, (A.F. & A.M.) and a supporter of the Missouri Athletic Club. He was a member of Pi Gamma Mu fraternity, a Fellow of the London College of Psychotherapy, a member of the Authors League of America; a member of the American Society of Psychical Research; a member of the Society of Rosicrucians; a member of the American Suggestive Therapeutical Association; and a member of the Science League of America. During his life, Haanel earned and received several honorary academic degrees, including hon. Ph.D., College National Electronic Institute; Metaphysics, Psy. D., College of Divine Metaphysics; and M.D., Universal College of Dupleix, India.

When Haanel died on November 27, 1949; he was 83 years old. His ashes were buried in Bellefontaine Cemetery, St. Louis.

== Career as financial success writer ==
Haanel's book The Master Key System was published in 1912, when he was 46 years old. It is written in the form of a course in New Thought, mental development, financial success, and personal health. The book was heavily promoted in the pages of Elizabeth Towne's New Thought magazine The Nautilus. By 1933 it had allegedly sold over 200,000 copies worldwide. Haanel practiced the financial principles he preached, and was a self-made success who owned several major companies. According to Stevens, writing in 1909, "He was president of the Continental Commercial Company, president of the Sacramento Valley Improvement Company, and president of the Mexico Gold & Silver Mining Company."

The original Master Key System contained 24 parts or modules of study. The allegedly "lost" chapters of the Master Key System, chapters 25–28, which are found in some editions, are not original, but have been copied from the chapters 11–14 of A book about You. Among the key points of Haanel's system are what he refers to as the laws of concentration, attraction, and harmonious thinking and action. Unique to the Master Key System is a set of exercises that accompany each chapter, and which are systematically building upon each other — they are what makes the Master Key System a system. Another important aspect of the Master Key System is the element of "Truth". The understanding of "Truth" is derived from the understanding that Spirit is all there is, and that it cannot be other than perfect. Truth provides readers/students with certainty, courage and determination to change their life for the better.

In addition to the Master Key System, Haanel wrote several other books including Mental Chemistry, published in 1922, The New Psychology, published in 1924, A Book about You, published in 1927, and The Amazing Secrets of the Yogi, co-authored with Victor Simon Perera and published in 1937.

== Influence on other writers ==
In 1919, Napoleon Hill wrote Haanel a letter thanking him for The Master Key System. In the letter Hill stated, "My present success and the success which has followed my work as President of the Napoleon Hill Institute is due largely to the principles laid down in The Master-Key System."

Haanel was quoted in the best-selling self-help book The Secret by Rhonda Byrne, published in 2007.

Actor and former football player Terry Crews has said about The Master Key System, "I have read hundreds of personal development books, but this is the one that clearly showed me how to visualize, contemplate, and focus on what I truly wanted. It revealed to me that we only get what we desire most, and to apply myself with a laserlike focus upon a goal, task or project. That in order to 'have', you must 'do', and in order to 'do', you must 'be' - and this process is immediate. [...] I also reread it probably once a month to keep my vision clear."

== Published works ==
Original titles

- The Amazing Secrets of the Yogi. c.1937
- A Book About You. 1928. (also reprinted with the shortened title You)
- The Master Key System. 1912 (mail order course)
- The Master Key System. 1917 (book format).
- Mental Chemistry. 1922.
- The New Psychology. 1924.

Variant editions of The Master Key System

- The Master Key System in 24 Parts. by Charles F. Haanel, edited by Anthony R. Michalski ISBN 0-9678514-0-8
- The Master Key System: 28 Part Complete Deluxe Edition. by Charles F. Haanel. Isthar Publishing (July 2007) ISBN 978-0-9780535-8-1
- The Master Key System Large Font Edition. by Charles F. Haanel, edited by Andras M. Nagy ISBN 978-0-9753093-3-9
- The Master Key System 2012 Centenary Edition. by Charles F. Haanel, edited by Helmar Rudolph ISBN 978-1-4563360-4-2

Posthumous compilations with written contributions by other authors

- Master Key Arcana. (the 28-chapter version of The Master Key plus pieces by authors who influenced Haanel; illustrated with pictures of original Haanel books, pamphlets, and courses.) 2004
- How to Master Abundance and Prosperity: The Master Key System Decoded: An Executive Summary. by Prof. C. W. Haanel Mentz ISBN 1-4257-1035-2
- The Master Key System in 24 Parts: Workbook Edition. by Charles F. Haanel and Donald Gordon Carty ISBN 1-4116-7362-X ISBN 978-1-4116-7362-5
- The Master Key BrainCharger Premium Student Handbook. by Helmar Rudolph ISBN 978-1-4563969-6-1. 2011.

== Biographic sources ==
- C. W. Evans-Gunther. "Biography of Charles F. Haanel & the Haanel Family".
- "Charles F. Haanel (1866-1949), Author of The Master Key System".
