= The Secret (2006 film) =

2006 documentary film

- DVD cover
- Directed by: Drew Heriot
- Written by: Rhonda Byrne
- Produced by: Paul Harrington; Rhonda Byrne
- Cinematography: John Hall; Noel Jones; Matt Koopmans
- Edited by: Damian Corboy; Daniel Kerr
- Distributed by: Prime Time Productions
- Release date: March 23, 2006
- Running time: 91 minutes
- Countries: Australia; United States
- Language: English
- Budget: $3.5 million
- Box office: $65.6 million

The Secret is a 2006 Australian-American spirituality pseudo-documentary consisting of a series of interviews designed to demonstrate the New Thought "law of attraction" - the belief that everything one wants or needs can be satisfied by believing in an outcome, repeatedly thinking about it, and maintaining positive emotional states to "attract" the desired outcome.

The film and the subsequent publication of the book of the same name attracted interest from media figures such as Oprah Winfrey, Ellen DeGeneres and Larry King.

== Synopsis ==
The Secret, described as a self-help film, uses a documentary format to present a concept titled "law of attraction". As described in the film, the "Law of Attraction" hypothesis posits that feelings and thoughts can attract events, feelings, and experiences, from the workings of the cosmos to interactions among individuals in their physical, emotional, and professional affairs. The film also suggests that there has been a strong tendency by those in positions of power to keep this central principle hidden from the public.

== Origins ==
The authors of The Secret cite the New Thought movement which began in the late 18th century as the historical basis for their ideas.

The New Thought book The Science of Getting Rich by Wallace Wattles, the source Rhonda Byrne cites as inspiration for the film, was preceded by many other New Thought books, which include the 1906 book Thought Vibration or the Law of Attraction in the Thought World by William Walker Atkinson, editor of New Thought magazine. Other New Thought books Byrne is purported to have read include self-help authors like Prentice Mulford's 19th-century Thoughts Are Things; and Robert Collier's Secret of the Ages from 1926.

Carolyn Sackariason of the Aspen Times, when commenting about Byrne's intention to share The Secret with the world, identifies the Rosicrucians, who originated in the early 17th century, as keepers of The Secret.

== Production ==
The Secret was created by Prime Time Productions of Melbourne, Australia with executive producer Rhonda Byrne, producer Paul Harrington, and director Drew Heriot. Gozer Media of Collingwood, a suburb of Melbourne, is the design house responsible for the visual style and feel of the film and its companion book. Byrne's company TS Production LLC, a Hungarian company, is responsible for marketing and distribution of the film and book. Byrne commented about the research she did prior to making the film:

So I sat down and did a huge list of everything I had read ... and when I finished the list I handed it to them [the film production team]. They said that's impossible, you couldn't read that many books in a year, two years, and I had read all of those books in two and a half weeks – and well, that's The Secret.

Byrne's inspiration for creating The Secret came from reading the 1910 book The Science of Getting Rich by Wallace D. Wattles. The film was done as a project for Australia's 9Network. Nine put up less than 25% of the $3 million project with additional funding from mortgaging Byrne's home and from an investment by Bob Rainone, "a former Internet executive in Chicago". Rainone became the CEO of one of Byrne's companies, The Secret LLC, and is described by Byrne as "delivered to us from heaven".

The interviews were conducted and filmed throughout July and August 2005, with editing "effectively completed by Christmas time". About 55 teachers and authors were interviewed at locations including Chicago, Aspen, Alaska, and a Mexican Riviera cruise (interviewing Esther Hicks). The film uses 24 of these teachers in the extended version. The first edition featured a 25th teacher, Hicks, known "as the most prominent interpreter of the Law of Attraction". Since the first DVD release, Hicks declined to continue with the project. Her 10% share of sales netted the Hickses $500,000. As a result of this, Hicks' scenes are instead narrated by Lisa Nichols and Marci Shimoff. No other "secret teachers" received compensation for their appearance in the film — revealed by Bob Proctor in an interview on Nightline.

What the Bleep Do We Know!? producer, director and screenwriter Betsy Chasse interviewed Secret co-producer Paul Harrington, who gave this description of Byrne's production methods. "We used the law of attraction during the making of the program. We went very unconventional, in terms of scheduling and budgeting. We allowed things to come to us... We just had faith that things would come to us."

9Network, after viewing the completed film, declined to broadcast it. A new contract was negotiated with all DVD sales going to Byrne's companies (Prime Time and The Secret LLC). In hindsight, Len Downs of Channel Nine commented, "we looked at it and we didn't deem it as having broad, mass appeal". It eventually broadcast on 3 February 2007 at 10:30 pm. Downs reported that "it didn't do all that well". The film was sold on DVD and also online through streaming media.

== Marketing ==
=== Packaging ===
The film has been described as a "slick repackaging" of the Law of Attraction, a concept originating in the New Thought ideas of the late 19th century. In producing the film, the law was intentionally "packaged" with a focus on "wealth enhancement", a departure from the more spiritual orientation of the New Thought Movement. One of the film's backers stated, "we desired to hit the masses, and money is the number one thing on the masses' minds". A review in salon.com described the packaging of the products related to the film as having "a look... that conjures a 'Da Vinci Code' aesthetic, full of pretty faux parchment, quill-and-ink fonts and wax seals."

Choosing to package the film's theme as a "secret" has been called an important component of the film's popularity. Donavin Bennes, a buyer who specializes in metaphysics for Borders, stated that "[w]e all want to be in on a secret. But to present it as the secret, that was brilliant."

=== Marketing campaign ===
The movie was advertised on the Internet using "tease" advertising and viral marketing; techniques in which the specific details of The Secret were not revealed. Additionally, Prime Time Productions granted written permission to individuals or companies, via application at the official site, to provide free screenings of the film to public audiences. Optionally, the DVD could be sold at these screenings.

== The book ==
A companion book by Rhonda Byrne was published called The Secret (Simon & Schuster, 2006). The Secret was featured on two episodes of Oprah — and as the film reached number one on the Amazon DVD chart in March 2007, the book version of The Secret reached number one on The New York Times bestseller list. For much of February through April 2007, both the book and the DVD versions were #1 or #2 at Amazon, Barnes & Noble, and Borders. Simon & Schuster released a second printing of 2 million copies of The Secret — "the biggest order for a second printing in its history," while Time reported brisk sales of the DVD through New Age bookstores, and New Thought churches, such as Unity and Agape International Spiritual Center. Like the movie, the book has also experienced a great deal of controversy and criticism for its claims, and has been parodied on several TV shows.

== Reception ==
=== Gross ===
The estimated domestic DVD sales in the US in 2007 exceed $56 million, and eventually topped $65 million.

=== Critical response ===
The Secret has been described as a "self-help phenomenon", a "publishing phenomenon", and a "cultural phenomenon".

Several critics wrote about the Secret in relation to self-help in general. Julie Mason, of the Ottawa Citizen, wrote that word of mouth about the film spread through Pilates classes, "get-rich-quick websites" and personal-motivation blogs. Jane Lampman, of the Christian Science Monitor, described The Secret as a brand promoting Secret-related teachers, seminars and retreats. According to Jill Culora, of the New York Post, fans of The Secret have posted on a wide range of blogs and Web forums accounts of how shifting from negative to positive thoughts made big improvements in their lives.

Jerry Adler of Newsweek called it "breathless pizzazz" for a tired self-help genre; "emphatically cinematic" and "driven by images and emotions rather than logic"; a blend of Tony Robbins and The Da Vinci Code; and "the Unsolved Mysteries of infomercials".

In 2007, The Secret was reportedly being discussed in "e-mails, in chat rooms, around office cubicles, [and] on blind dates". It is recognized as having a broad and varied impact on culture.

American TV host Oprah Winfrey is a proponent of the film and later the book. On The Larry King Show she said that the message of The Secret is the message she's been trying to share with the world on her show for the past 21 years. Author Rhonda Byrne was later invited to her show along people who vow by The Secret.

Some critics were bothered by the film's focus on questionable wealth enhancement, including promises that the universe will give you material goods "like having the universe as your catalog."

According to a March 2007 issue of Skeptical Inquirer, the central idea of the film "has [no] basis in scientific reality", despite invoking scientific concepts.

Within businesses using the DVD for employee-training and morale-building, author Barbara Ehrenreich called it "a gimmick" and "disturbing", like "being indoctrinated into a cult".

UFC former champion Conor McGregor claims The Secret played a role in his rise to fame. McGregor has said his first reaction on watching the DVD version was: "This is bullshit — but then something clicked for me." He and girlfriend Dee Devlin, who manages his finances, started focusing on small things they wanted, such as a parking space closest to the doors of a local shopping centre. He said: "We would be driving to the shop and visualising the exact car park space. And then we'd be able to get it every time." They then began visualizing wealth, fame and championships.

=== Parodies ===
The Law of Attraction and/or The Secret was parodied on Parks and Recreation, The Chaser's War on Everything, It's Always Sunny in Philadelphia, The Simpsons, Boston Legal and Saturday Night Live.

== Legal controversies ==
A Current Affair, an Australian newsmagazine airing on The Secret's co-funder 9Network, carried a 14 May 2007 segment titled "The Secret Stoush". Australian author Vanessa J. Bonnette is interviewed, and Bonnette—when referring to the book version of The Secret—asserts, "that is my work and Rhonda Byrne has stolen it". Bonnette and a reporter compare her book to Byrne's on the use of the "TV transmission" analogy. Bonnette's book, Empowered for the New Era was released in 2007 as a second edition. Bonnette, at her website, claims 100 instances of plagiarism. Byrne's marketing company, TS Production LLC, has responded with a lawsuit to restrain Bonnette. From the statement of claim:

Analogy between frequency transmissions, including a television station transmission via a frequency, and humans and human thought is used by many persons in the field of self-help and motivation.

David Schirmer, the "investment guru"—and only Australian—in the film, has his business activities under investigation by the Australian Securities Investment Commission (ASIC). This was reported on 1 June 2007 by A Current Affair in a segment titled "The Secret Con" with those words and The Secret logo appearing in the background behind the newscaster. The show initially confronted Schirmer in a segment titled "The Secret Exposed", aired on 28 May 2007, with complaints from people who say Schirmer owed them money.

On 12 February 2008, Bob Proctor's company, LifeSuccess Productions, L.L.C. successfully sued Schirmer, his wife Lorna, and their several companies (including LifeSuccess Pacific Rim PTY LTD, Schirmer Financial Management PTY LTD, LifeSuccess Productions PTY LTD, Excellence in Marketing PTY LTD, and Wealth By Choice PTY LTC) for "misleading or deceptive conduct".

In August 2008, The Australian reported that director Heriot and Internet consultant Dan Hollings were in a legal dispute with Byrne over pay from the project.

Footage featuring Esther Hicks was removed from the "Extended Edition" of The Secret after Byrne rescinded the original contract covering Hicks' participation.

== Releases ==
Paul Harrington, the producer for the film, reported that broadcast TV—instead of the Internet—was initially planned as the medium for the first release:

...we had as our vision to go out to the whole world in 24 hours on television. It was a grand vision, which we weren't able to pull off for various reasons. We were trying to force, to control the "how" of the universe, when what we were supposed to do was just focus on the vision...

=== Release dates ===
The Secret premiere was broadcast through the Internet on 23 March 2006 using Vividas technology. It is still available either on a pay-per-view basis via streaming media (or on DVD at the official site for the film). A new extended edition of The Secret was released to the public on 1 October 2006. The Australian television premiere was on Nine Network on Saturday, 3 February 2007.

=== Future releases and spin-offs ===
Plans were announced in 2007 to produce a sequel to The Secret and a spin-off TV series. The drama film The Secret: Dare to Dream, starring Katie Holmes and Josh Lucas, was released on July 31, 2020.

== See also ==
- Affirmative prayer
- As a Man Thinketh
- Cosmic ordering
- Just-world fallacy
- Magical thinking
- One: The Movie
- Positive mental attitude
- Pygmalion effect
- Quantum mysticism
- The Kybalion
- Think and Grow Rich
- Wishful thinking
- Toxic positivity
