= List of self-help books =

This is a list of notable self-help books.

Title	Year	Author	Topic
Enchiridion of Epictetus	125	Epictetus	philosophy
Meditations	180	Marcus Aurelius	philosophy
As a Man Thinketh	1903	James Allen	positive thinking
The Master Key System	1916	Charles F. Haanel	optimism
How to Win Friends and Influence People	1936	Dale Carnegie	success
Think and Grow Rich	1937	Napoleon Hill	success
How to Stop Worrying and Start Living	1948	Dale Carnegie	optimism
The Power of Positive Thinking	1952	Norman Vincent Peale	optimism
The Magic of Thinking Big	1959	David J. Schwartz	success
Psycho-Cybernetics	1960	Maxwell Maltz	self image
Dress for Success	1975	John T. Molloy	success
Your Erroneous Zones	1976	Wayne Dyer	health
You Can Heal Your Life	1984	Louise Hay	health
Women Who Love Too Much	1985	Robin Norwood	relationship
Unlimited Power	1986	Tony Robbins	success
The Seven Habits of Highly Effective People	1989	Stephen Covey	success
I'm Dysfunctional, You're Dysfunctional	1992	Wendy Kaminer	anti-self-help
The Seven Spiritual Laws of Success	1994	Deepak Chopra	spirituality
The Monk Who Sold His Ferrari	1997	Robin Sharma	health
The Power of Now	1997	Eckhart Tolle	optimism
Rich Dad Poor Dad	1997	Robert Kiyosaki	personal finance
The 48 Laws of Power	1998	Robert Greene	success
Getting Things Done	2001	David Allen	productivity
The Surrendered Wife	2001	Laura Doyle	relationship
The War of Art	2002	Steven Pressfield	creativity
The Purpose Driven Life	2002	Rick Warren	spirituality
A New Earth	2005	Eckhart Tolle	spirituality
The Easy Way to Stop Smoking	2006	Allen Carr	health
The Secret	2006	Rhonda Byrne	optimism
The 100-Mile Diet	2007	Alisa Smith and J.B. MacKinnon	health
The 4-Hour Workweek	2007	Timothy Ferriss	productivity
The Happiness Trap	2007	Dr. Russ Harris	mindset
Act like a Lady, Think like a Man	2009	Steve Harvey	relationship
I Will Teach You To Be Rich	2009	Ramit Sethi	success
The Life-Changing Magic of Tidying Up	2011	Marie Kondo	lifestyle
Everything I Need To Know I Learned From A Little Golden Book	2013	Diane Muldrow	inspiration
How to Fail at Almost Everything and Still Win Big	2013	Scott Adams	success
Deep Work	2016	Cal Newport	productivity
The Subtle Art of Not Giving a F*ck	2016	Mark Manson	mindset
Principles: Life and Work	2017	Ray Dalio	decision-making
Atomic Habits	2018	James Clear	habits
Selfie of Success	2019	Burra Venkatesham	success
Tiny Habits	2019	B. J. Fogg	habits

== See also ==
- List of counseling topics
- Lists of books
- Personal development
- Self-help
- Self education
- Self-improvement
