= HarperOne =

American publisher

- Parent company: HarperCollins
- Predecessor: Harper San Francisco
- Founded: 1977; 49 years ago
- Country of origin: United States
- Headquarters location: San Francisco, California
- Key people: Judith Curr; President; Publisher
- Publication types: Books
- Official website: www.harperone.com

HarperOne is a publishing imprint of HarperCollins, specializing in books that aim to "transform, inspire, change lives, and influence cultural discussions." Under the original name of Harper San Francisco, the imprint was founded in 1977 by 13 employees of the New York City–based Harper & Row, who traveled west to San Francisco to be at the center of the New Age movement. Harper acquired the religious publisher Winston-Seabury from CBS in 1986. Harper San Francisco changed its name to HarperOne in 2007, and expanded its core book categories beyond religion and spirituality to include health and wellness and inspirational non-fiction.

== Partial bibliography ==
- The Alchemist by Paulo Coelho (25th anniversary edition 2015)
- The Subtle Art of Not Giving a F*ck by Mark Manson (2016)
- What Is the Bible? by Rob Bell (2017)
- Brave by Rose McGowan (2018)
- Mere Christianity by C.S. Lewis (repackaged edition 2015)
- Search Inside Yourself by Chade-Meng Tan (2012)
- The End of Dieting by Dr. Joel Fuhrman (2015)
- A Return to Love by Marianne Williamson (reissue edition, 1996)
- Made for Goodness by Archbishop Desmond Tutu (reprint edition 2011)
- My Spiritual Journey by the Dalai Lama (2010)
- The Art of Power by Thich Nhat Hanh (2007)
- The Dark Night of the Soul by Gerald May (2004)
- You Belong: A Call for Connection by Sebene Selassie (2020)
- Save Me from Myself by Brian "Head" Welch
