= The Secret of The Secret =

- Author: Karen Kelly
- Published: 2007
- Publisher: Thomas Dunne Books

The Secret of The Secret is book written by journalist Karen Kelly which explores the explosive success of the book The Secret and the people and ideas behind it. It was published in 2007 by Thomas Dunne Books.
