= Awaken the Giant Within =

1991 self-help book by Tony Robbins

- First edition cover
- Author: Tony Robbins
- Language: English
- Genre: Self-help book
- Publisher: Simon & Schuster
- Publication date: November 1, 1991
- Media type: Print (hardcover, paperback), audio
- ISBN: 978-0671750183

Awaken the Giant Within is a 1991 self-help book and the second by American writer and motivational speaker Anthony (Tony) Robbins. The book covers decision-making, emotional regulation, goal setting, and personal finance management. The book appeared on a 1992 The New York Times bestseller list, and its bestseller status was noted again during a 2010 profile with Robbins. Publishers Weekly listed the book on its Hardcover Nonfiction bestseller list from November 1991 through February 1992, where it peaked at number 5.

In 2026, a 35th, updated, anniversary edition was published.

== Content ==
The book discusses changing beliefs, habits, and behaviors through exercises centered on values, emotions, and goal setting.

== Reception ==
Business Insider included the book in a retrospective list of the top 25 leadership and success books.

Molly Driscoll of The Christian Science Monitor ranked the book number 5 in a list of the top 10 self-help books of all time, highlighting Robbins' approach to personal development and identifying him as "a giant of the contemporary self-help field since the 1990s."

Author Tom Butler-Bowdon incorporated Awaken the Giant Within in his book 50 Self-Help Classics, describing it as "a sort of Statue of Liberty in words." He later reproduced the review for Citywire.

== In popular culture ==
Awaken the Giant Within features prominently in short story "Minimum Payment Due" by writer Saïd Sayrafiezadeh for The New Yorker, where the main character reads the book and manages to turn around their financial problems.

== See also ==
- Unlimited Power: The New Science of Personal Achievement
