= Hala Taha =

Palestinian-American entrepreneur, podcast host and keynote speaker

Hala Taha is a Palestinian-American entrepreneur, podcast host, and keynote speaker. She is the founder and CEO of YAP Media and YAP Media Network, and the host of the Young and Profiting podcast.

== Early life and education ==
Hala Taha pursued higher education at the New Jersey Institute of Technology (NJIT), where she completed a Bachelor of Science degree and a Master of Business Administration. While in college, Taha was a radio production host at HOT97 on "The Angie Martinez Show.” She also started an entertainment blog by the name of "The Sorority of Hip Hop."

== Career ==
In 2018, she launched the Young and Profiting (YAP) Podcast, which focuses on education and self-improvement. The podcast has reached the #1 position in the Education and Self-Improvement categories. The program was recognized as a 2022 Webby Honoree. The podcast has featured interviews with celebrities such as Matthew McConaughey, Mel Robbins, Deepak Chopra, Gary Vaynerchuk, Daymond John, James Clear, and Seth Godin.

In January 2022, Taha launched YAP Media Network, a podcast network and marketing agency that provides services to podcasters and business executives.
