= The Secret: Dare to Dream =

2020 film directed by Andy Tennant

- Theatrical release poster with original release date
- Directed by: Andy Tennant
- Screenplay by: Andy Tennant; Bekah Brunstetter; Rick Parks
- Based on: The Secret by Rhonda Byrne
- Produced by: Rhonda Byrne; Robert W. Cort; Joe Gelchion; Matthew George; Robert Katz
- Starring: Katie Holmes; Josh Lucas; Jerry O'Connell; Celia Weston
- Cinematography: Andrew Dunn
- Edited by: Troy Takaki
- Music by: George Fenton
- Production companies: Savvy Media Holdings; Robert Cort Productions; Covert Media; Illumination Productions; Shine Box; Tri G
- Distributed by: Roadside Attractions; Gravitas Ventures
- Release date: July 31, 2020 (United States)
- Running time: 107 minutes
- Country: United States
- Language: English
- Budget: $9.2 million
- Box office: $3.2 million

The Secret: Dare to Dream is a 2020 American romantic drama film based on the 2006 self-help book The Secret by Rhonda Byrne. Directed by Andy Tennant, from a screenplay he wrote with Bekah Brunstetter and Rick Parks, it stars Katie Holmes, Josh Lucas, Jerry O'Connell, and Celia Weston.

Engineering professor and amateur inventor Bray Johnson shows the hard-working young widow Miranda Wells the power of positive thinking by example.

The film was released in the United States through video on demand, and theatrically in several countries, on July 31, 2020, by Roadside Attractions and Gravitas Ventures.

== Plot ==
Miranda Wells is a widow raising three children while managing her boyfriend Tucker Middendorf's seafood restaurant in New Orleans. Bray Johnson is an engineering professor from Vanderbilt University trying to deliver an envelope to Miranda. He fails to connect with her at her house, then inadvertently meets her when she rear-ends his truck with her car. Miranda accepts his offer to fix her broken bumper and he follows her home. He stays for dinner. Miranda's kids Bess, Greg, and Missy, want pizza for dinner, something Miranda can't afford. Bray stresses the power of positive thinking just as a delivery person appears at the door with pizza ordered by Tucker. Bray never finds the right moment to give the envelope to Miranda, and leaves it in the mailbox before departing.

A hurricane hits that night, causing a tree to fall through Miranda's roof. Bray returns to check on them, sees the mailbox missing, and offers to fix the roof as best as he can. Miranda and the kids move in with the children’s paternal grandmother, Bobby, during repairs. The next day, Tucker publicly proposes marriage to Miranda at the restaurant. With all eyes on her, she reluctantly accepts.

The following day, at Missy's 16th birthday party, Bobby shows Miranda an old news article about a new invention. Bobby's late son Matt, who had been Miranda's husband, is shown in the article's photograph, next to Bray. Bobby assumes Bray stole the invention from her son, and Miranda confronts him. He explains he and Matt were partners and that he was lucky to survive the plane crash that killed Matt. Unable to explain his sincere intention of delivering her a copy of the patent, he is asked to leave.

Bray sends another copy of the patent to Miranda, who realizes its monetary value would solve her family's problems. They locate the mailbox with the original copy of the patent, confirming Bray was telling the truth. Miranda calls off her engagement with Tucker, knowing she doesn't truly love him, and quits Tucker's restaurant. Miranda drives to Bray's house to clear the air, but his sister explains Bray has left- to go to Miranda's. They meet at a Waffle House and embrace.

Miranda's family moves in with Bray in Tennessee, and Bray fulfills Bess' longtime dream of having an pony.

== Cast ==
- Katie Holmes as Miranda Wells
- Josh Lucas as Bray Johnson
- Jerry O'Connell as Tucker Middendorf
- Celia Weston as Bobby
- Sarah Hoffmeister as Missy Wells
- Aidan Brennan as Greg Wells
- Chloe Grace Lee as Bess Wells
- Katrina Begin as Jennifer
- Sydney Tennant as Sloane
- Cory Scott Allen as Matt Wells
- Jeremy Warner as The Pizza Guy

== Production ==
In August 2017, it was announced Katie Holmes had joined the cast of the film, with Andy Tennant directing from a screenplay he wrote alongside Bekah Brunstetter and Rick Parks, based on the 2006 self-help book The Secret by Rhonda Byrne. The book has been translated into 50 languages and appeared on the New York Times bestseller list for 190 weeks. In September 2018, Josh Lucas joined the cast of the film. In November 2018, Jerry O'Connell and Celia Weston joined the cast of the film.

Principal photography began on October 30, 2018, in New Orleans.

== Release ==
In November 2019, Roadside Attractions and Gravitas Ventures acquired distribution rights to the film. It was scheduled to be released on April 17, 2020, however due to the COVID-19 pandemic it was pulled from the schedule. Roadside Attractions originally stated that it would announce a new theatrical release "[o]nce clarity for a safe and comfortable moviegoing experience is established", but the film's theatrical release was eventually canceled. Instead, it debuted through video on demand on July 31, 2020.

== Reception ==
=== VOD sales ===
In its debut weekend, The Secret: Dare to Dream was the top-rented film on FandangoNow, second at Apple TV, seventh on the iTunes Store, and 10th on Spectrum. In its second weekend the film finished second on FandangoNow's weekly rental chart, and placed on two others.

=== Critical response ===
On review aggregator website Rotten Tomatoes, the film holds an approval rating of 28% based on 53 reviews, with an average rating of 4.6/10. The website's critics consensus reads: "For those who Dare to Dream of a worthy dramatic adaptation of The Secret, this sodden romance will prove a disappointment too painful to visualize." On Metacritic, the film has a weighted average score of 32 out of 100, based on 11 critics, indicating "generally unfavorable reviews".

For her performance in this film, Katie Holmes was nominated for a Golden Raspberry Award for Worst Actress.
