= The Magic (book) =

2012 self-help book by Rhonda Byrne

- Author: Rhonda Byrne
- Genre: Self-help, spiritual
- Publisher: Atria Books
- Publication date: March 6, 2012
- Publication place: Australia
- Media type: Print (paperback), ebook
- Pages: 272 (first edition, paperback)
- ISBN: 978-1451673449 (first edition, paperback)
- Preceded by: The Power

The Magic is a 2012 self-help and spirituality book written by Rhonda Byrne. It is the third book in The Secret series. The book was released on March 6, 2012, as a paperback and e-book. The book is available in 41 languages.

== See also ==
- The Hero
- The Power
- The Secret
- Toxic positivity
