= Atomic Habits =

2018 self-help book by James Clear

Atomic Habits: An Easy & Proven Way to Build Good Habits & Break Bad Ones
- Author: James Clear
- Audio read by: James Clear
- Language: English
- Genre: Self-help book
- Publisher: Avery Publishing
- Publication date: October 16, 2018
- Publication place: United States
- ISBN: 978-0-735-21129-2

Atomic Habits: An Easy & Proven Way to Build Good Habits & Break Bad Ones is a 2018 self-help book by writer James Clear on habit reversal. Its general assertion is that the willpower a person needs to overcome a negatively-affecting habit, such as an addiction, is most easily developed by slowly replacing it with a small and minimally exerting positive habit—"getting 1% better each day".

The book was a major financial success. By February 2024, it had sold nearly 20 million copies and topped the New York Times best-seller list for 260 weeks (nearly 5 years). Many figures in the field of business have embraced the book as helpful, such as Entrepreneur's John Rampton, who listed it as one of the best-ever books on time management and productivity. Atomic Habits' critics include The Guardian's Steven Phillips-Horst, who wrote that it was pseudoscientific for allegedly using unsound methodology and circular logic.

== Synopsis ==
James Clear gives readers advice on breaking any habit which negatively affects them, and replacing it with a positive habit—such as an efficient work ethic in place of procrastination, or abstaining from an addiction in place of continuing it. He claims that if the reader often displays negative habitual behavior, it is not caused by "you"—in that "you" specifically are inherently predisposed to perpetuating the habit, as the reader may believe—but rather by "your system": the reader's network of previously self-imposed psychological barriers which now prevent the personal growth they need to break the habit. Clear writes that this "system" can also prevent the reader from naturally displaying positive habitual behavior, but says that they can break their system down over time.

Clear says that all habits are made of a "cue, craving, response, and reward”, which he exemplifies with people needing light to see: a person receives a "cue" that they need light to see inside of a room, they "crave" better vision and thus turn on a light in the room, they feel the "response" of better vision, and get the "reward" of seeing clearly.

The book's "ethos" is that the readers' "lack of willpower" towards displaying positive habits is best fought with "getting 1% better each day": if they make a routine of displaying "atomic habits", positive habits which require little exertion, they build up their ability to display larger ones which, otherwise, they would not have enough willpower to do routinely. Clear says that "designing the right environment to build habits" is necessary for this; the reader should focus on the "deepest layer of behavior change"—changing their identity—which he simplifies by saying, "the goal isn’t to run a marathon, it’s to become a runner.” For this task, the reader should engage in self-actualization, finding out "who [they] want to be" and proving their new identity to themselves by solving the tasks required to become that person.

Similar to other self-help books, but with his own terminology, Clear recommends "stacking", or starting a task immediately after finishing another; and then "temptation bundling", giving yourself a small reward for doing the "stacked" habits. He notes that positive habits come more naturally to some people than others; as an example, he says that people with higher oxytocin levels are more likely to be "high in agreeableness", so they "might be inclined to build habits like writing thank-you notes."

== Publication history ==
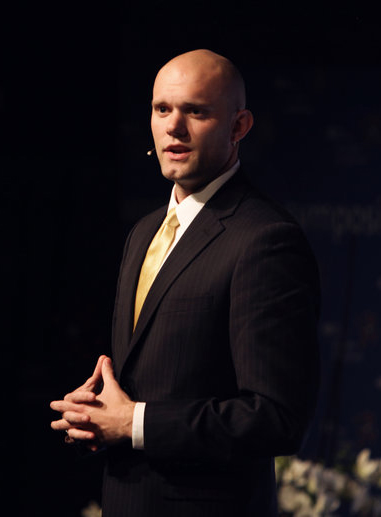
James Clear in 2010

Atomic Habits was first published by Avery Publishing (an imprint of the Penguin Group) on October 16, 2018. After its publication, Clear started selling the "Clear Habit Journal", a daily planner intended to aid in the development of good habits. The book was reissued in 2023 with a new cover design by George Griffiths, which won the Penguin Cover Design Award in 2024 for books in the adult non-fiction category. In 2024, Clear released a smartphone app named "Atoms", intended to help in the same way as the planner.

== Reception ==
Atomic Habits was not an instant success, only gaining popularity in the years following its publication. In 2024, Forbes' Omaid Homayum said that it had "caught fire", having sold nearly 20 million copies, and that quotes from the book had "broken the Internet". Literary Hub's James Folta said that it had become a part of the literary canon among "business thought leader[s]" on LinkedIn. As of February 14, 2024, the book had topped the New York Times best-seller list of U.S. book sales for 164 weeks, and was the top-selling book on Amazon. Slate wrote that Atomic Habits was the "self-help book of the decade". In 2025, the book came at number 10 in The Sunday Times Bestsellers List of U.K. book sales.

In Entrepreneur, John Rampton listed Atomic Habits as one of the 17 best books ever written on management and productivity. Dayana Aleksandrova wrote for Business Insider that it was "unanimously recommended" by every "higher-performer" person she questioned about how they achieved their work ethic. She said reading the book "change[d] my life for the better", as "so far, the lessons I've taken away from the book have worked at an 100% success rate—especially when it comes to addressing procrastination." The Independent's Nikk Cottrell and actress Rosamund Pike also said it helped them. Luigi Mangione, the accused murderer of UnitedHealthcare CEO Brian Thompson, listed the book as one of his favorites on Goodreads.

Some critics were skeptical or disapproving of Atomic Habits' theories. The New Yorker's Anthony Lane wrote that inevitably, "[a reader's] conscience rebels" against the advice of self-help books like it, if a minor obstacle comes in the way of their own reading habit: "You were reading [Atomic Habits] and doing well until you spilled half a bottle of Knob Creek over the last sixty pages. Now you’ll never know how it ends." Steven Phillips-Horst strongly rebuked the book's theories and supposed usefulness in The Guardian, saying it is one of many trending modern therapy books like The Body Keeps the Score (2014) and The Subtle Art of Not Giving A Fuck (2016) that have "pseudoscientific grand theories on human behavior", and "comforting yet impenetrable" advice. He described them as "[peddling] feel-good Marvel movie versions of philosophy that don’t challenge our conceptions, but validate our feelings, often backing up their circular logic with dubious 'research' and 'experts'."

== See also ==
- Personal development
- Behavior therapy
- Behavioral addiction
- Addiction psychology
