= Everything Is Fucked =

2019 book by Mark Manson

- Book cover
- Author: Mark Manson
- Language: English
- Publisher: Harper
- Publication date: May 2019
- Publication place: United States
- Media type: Print
- Preceded by: The Subtle Art of Not Giving a F*ck

Everything Is Fucked: A Book About Hope is the third book by American blogger and author Mark Manson, published in 2019. It follows Manson's previous self-help book, The Subtle Art of Not Giving a Fuck. It is a bestseller, debuting at number one on the New York Times Best Seller list for Life Advice, How-to, and Miscellaneous.

== Contents ==
The book has nine chapters:

1. The Uncomfortable Truth
2. Self-Control Is an Illusion
3. Newton's Laws of Emotion
4. How to Make All Your Dreams Come True
5. Hope Is Fucked
6. The Formula of Humanity
7. Pain Is the Universal Constant
8. The Feelings Economy
9. The Final Religion
