= The Magic of Thinking Big =

1959 book by David J. Schwartz

- First edition
- Author: David J. Schwartz
- Language: English
- Genre: Self-help
- Publisher: Wilshire Book Co, Chatsworth, California
- Publication date: 1959
- Publication place: United States
- Pages: 228
- ISBN: 9781501118210
- OCLC: 319677191

The Magic of Thinking Big, first published in 1959, is a self-help book by David J. Schwartz. An abridged version was published in 1987.

Forbes called it one of the greatest self-help books.

== Reception and influence ==
By the end of 1982, it was one of Simon & Schuster's all-time paperback best sellers with 1,494,000 sales. By 2015, over 6 million copies had been sold.

Thomas J. Stanley wrote on his website how Schwartz and the book motivated him to write his bestseller, The Millionaire Next Door. Both were marketing department faculty at Georgia State University and would discuss "success". Schwartz suggested how to improve Stanley's first book, Marketing to the Affluent, "Now put all your focus on how they became wealthy. Think big.”

The American football coach, and sportscaster - Lou Holtz said it was his favorite book.

Basketball coach Joe Harrington gave each member of the Long Beach State 49ers a copy during the 1980s. Lefty Driesell at the University of Maryland also gave the book out to team members.

== See also ==
- List of self-help books
