= Wade Cook =

American financial guru (1949–2021)

Wade Bruce Cook (October 9, 1949 – July 28, 2021) was an American author and self-proclaimed financial guru. Cook claimed to have started his success when he was a taxi driver in the 1970s. His first book, Real Estate Money Machine, was originally self-published in 1981. He filed for personal bankruptcy in 1987. An updated version of his book was published in 1996. His company was liquidated in 2003 after it had been forced into Chapter 11 bankruptcy by creditors, and he served 88 months in prison for tax evasion. He offered trading advice through his website and publications for a period after his release from prison.

== Background ==
In the 1990s, Cook was aggressive in his use of paid radio programs which he used to market investment seminars. He claimed he could teach people to double some of their money every 2.5 to 4 months. Obviously this claim was controversial, and there was eventually an agreement with the government to drop that claim.

Cook was a proponent of rolling stocks (stocks that regularly vacillate between "predictable" highs and lows) and has been very vocal about stock splits being a good way to make money, claiming that many stocks rose post split (since the end of the 1990s bull market, Cook became less of a proponent of this concept). One of his more famous phrases was meter drop. Cook said that as a cab driver he learned that money was made every time the meter dropped, and that it was better to take many small fares rather than one big one. This translated to Cook's short-term investment strategy of buying and selling many stocks for smaller, quicker profits rather than buying and holding securities for an extended period in the hope that they will increase greatly. He charged US$5,695 per person for "Wall Street Workshops" that were offered across the United States.

In 2002, Cook's company, Wade Cook Financial Corporation (WCFC), filed for bankruptcy. The stock now trades on the pink sheets for around "a penny a share". After the bankruptcy of WCFC, Cook kept a considerably lower profile, using the internet as his primary means of marketing. He continued writing books and launched a multi-level investment program.

Wade Cook was a member of the Church of Jesus Christ of Latter-day Saints and has been known to use references to religion in his writings and presentations.

== Financial and legal troubles ==
In 1987, Cook filed personal bankruptcy. Two companies he controlled, American Business Alliance and Monarch Funding Corporation, also went bankrupt that year.

In 1989, Cook was charged with securities violations by the Arizona Corporation Commission. The following year, the Arizona Attorney General charged him with several criminal counts, including selling unregistered shares of a company he controlled.

In 1998, Cook won a settlement against self-help author Anthony Robbins over his claim that Robbins had illegally used concepts (particularly the "meter drop") from Cook's book Wall Street Money Machine to create a financial seminar. Robbins agreed that he had read the book and met with Cook, but disputed the illegality of his use of the concepts. A jury in Tacoma, Washington sided with Cook and awarded damages in the amount of US$655,900.

In 2000, WCFC, a company which sold seminars on investing and offered subscriptions to a trading bulletin board service called the Wealth Information Network (W.I.N.), posted US$1.7 million in trading losses. The stated purpose of posting the bulletin board information about these trades was to let attendees of his financial workshops "learn from the master" by seeing what securities Cook bought and sold. Gaining access to "Wade's Trades" was touted as one of the major advantages of attending these seminars. Subscribers to Wade's Trades could purchase the same securities that Wade Cook purchased and theoretically, could duplicate his results. The bulletin board often recommended the securities of obscure corporations or options in which there was a fairly small market. When Cook's students began purchasing these investments, they tended to drive up the price. Initial purchasers could then liquidate their own positions in these investments at a profit, thus proving to Cook's students that he had a talent for picking securities that were poised to go up in value. Unfortunately, the increase in the value of the securities was often short-lived; since the price would be driven back down as students began to sell their positions. If most of the activity in the recommended securities was due to transactions by bulletin board subscribers, it is reasonable to conclude that at least some of these investment recommendations would become self-fulfilling prophesies.

On October 5, 2000, Wade Cook Financial Corporation agreed to a settlement with the Federal Trade Commission (FTC) and 14 state Attorneys General on charges that the corporation misrepresented earnings potential. WCFC claimed 20% monthly returns. As a result, WCFC was required to set up redress program for consumers who purchased its products and to alter its advertised earnings claims. In 2002 the FTC brought new charges based on failure to comply with the previous order.

In 2002, WCFC was forced into Chapter 11 bankruptcy by a group of its creditors, including several employees and independent contractors, who claimed they had not been paid for several months. U.S. Bankruptcy Judge Thomas Glover ordered the company liquidated on January 18, 2003, for failure to provide testimony creditors had requested.

In December 2005, Cook and his wife Laura were charged with several counts of income tax evasion. Both pleaded not guilty. According to court documents, the Cooks operated a fraudulent charity, ostensibly to benefit the LDS Church, but instead bought show horses, his and her Cadillacs, a 40-acre (160,000 m^{2}) estate, and the majority share of an oil rig which gave Cook the right to name it. He named it after himself. The trial began on January 17, 2007.

On February 20, 2007, Cook was found guilty by a federal jury of seven charges for failing to pay taxes on $8.9 million that the government says he should have reported as personal income from 1998 to 2000. His sentencing was set for June 22, 2007. On May 16, 2007, Laura Cook pled guilty to obstructing federal tax laws and faced up to three years in prison and a fine of up to $250,000.

On August 2, 2007, Cook was sentenced to 88 months in prison, and Laura was sentenced to 18 months in prison. Cook was also ordered to pay back $3.75 million in owed back taxes. On September 4, 2008, Cook was taken into custody at the Federal Detention Center in SeaTac, Washington, preceding transfer to a prison where he was to serve the remainder of his 88-month sentence. He was released from the Federal Satellite Prison Camp Sheridan in Sheridan, Oregon in April 2014 into the custody of the Pioneer Fellowship House in Seattle, Washington, and was released January 22, 2015, according to the federal prison system online search.

After his release from prison, Cook began selling the same literature he was selling for years before being imprisoned.

== Death ==
Cook died of cancer on July 28, 2021. He was an Air Force veteran, and he is buried at the Tahoma National Cemetery in Covington, WA.

== Books by Wade Cook ==
- Real Estate Money Machine
- Stock Market Miracles
- Don't Set Goals: The Old Way
- Bear Market Baloney
- Business Buy the Bible
- Brilliant Deductions
- How to Pick Up Foreclosures
- Wall Street Money Machine (Vols. 1-5)
- Blueprints for Success
- Real Estate for Real People
- Cook's Book on Creative Real Estate
- Wealth 101
- Y2K Gold Rush
- Safety 1st Investing
- Wade Cook's Power Quotes
- Red Light, Green Light
- Two Bad Years and Up We Go!
- Wade Cook's Stock Picking Handbook
- Stock Market Money Machine
