= Allen Carr =

British author (1934–2006)

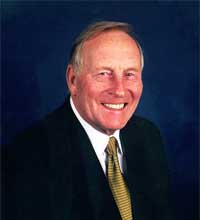
- Born: Allen John Carr; 2 September 1934; Putney, London, England
- Died: 29 November 2006 (aged 72); Benalmádena, Andalusia, Spain
- Occupations: Author, accountant
- Writing career
- Genre: Self-help
- Notable work: The Easy Way to Stop Smoking (1985)
- Website: www.allencarr.com

Allen John Carr (2 September 1934 – 29 November 2006) was a British author of books about smoking cessation and other psychological dependencies.

== Biography ==
Born in Putney, London, Carr started smoking cigarettes while doing National Service aged 18. He qualified as an accountant in 1958.

Carr finally stopped smoking on 15 July 1983, aged 48, after a visit to a hypnotherapist. However, it was not the hypnotherapy itself that enabled him to stop – "I succeeded in spite of and not because of that visit" and "I lit up the moment I left the clinic and made my way home...". There were two key pieces of information that enabled Carr to stop later that day. First, the hypnotherapist told him smoking was "just nicotine addiction", which Carr had never perceived before that moment, i.e. that he was an addict. Second, his son John lent him a medical handbook which explained that the physical withdrawal from nicotine is just like an "empty, insecure feeling". He claims that these two realisations crystallised in his mind just how easy it was to stop and so then enabled him to follow an overwhelming desire to explain his method to as many smokers as possible.

=== Philosophy ===
Carr teaches that smokers do not receive a boost from smoking a cigarette, and that smoking only relieves the withdrawal symptoms from the previous cigarette, which in turn creates more withdrawal symptoms once it is finished. In this way the drug addiction perpetuates itself. He asserted that the "relief" smokers feel on lighting a cigarette, the feeling of being "back to normal", is the feeling experienced by non-smokers all the time. He further asserted that withdrawal symptoms are actually created by doubt and fear in the mind of the ex-smoker, and therefore that stopping smoking is not as traumatic as is commonly assumed, if that doubt and fear can be removed.

At Allen Carr Clinics during stop-smoking sessions, smokers are allowed to continue smoking while their doubts and fears are removed, with the aim of encouraging and developing the mindset of a non-smoker before the final cigarette is extinguished. A further reason for allowing smokers to smoke while undergoing counselling is Carr's belief that it is more difficult to convince a smoker to stop until they understand the mechanism of "the nicotine trap". This is because their attention is diminished while they continue to believe it is traumatic and extremely difficult to quit and continue to maintain the belief that they are dependent on nicotine.

Another assertion unique to Carr's method is that willpower is not required to stop smoking.

His contention was that fear of "giving up" is what causes the majority of smokers to continue smoking, thereby necessitating the smoker's perpetuation of the illusion of genuine enjoyment as a moral justification of the inherent absurdity of smoking in the face of overwhelming medical and scientific evidence of its dangers. Instead, he encourages smokers to think of the act of quitting, not as giving up, but as "escaping".

=== Easyway ===
Carr left his accountancy job in 1983 and set up his first Easyway clinic. He wrote ten books which appeared as bestsellers on selected book ranking charts including his first book The Easy Way to Stop Smoking (1985). The success of the original London clinic, through word-of-mouth and direct recommendation, has led to a worldwide network of more than 200 Easyway clinics in 50 countries plus the production of online video programmes, audiobooks, audio CDs, games and DVDs. Seminars are now offered to stop smoking, stop drinking, quit drugs, lose weight and stop gambling.

Allen Carr's Easyway is clinically tested through two randomised controlled trials. In 2018 an Irish trial found that Allen Carr's Easyway was almost twice as effective as Quit.ie and in 2020 a UK randomised clinical trial found Allen Carr's Easyway "as good as if not better than, the Gold Standard NHS Programme which uses NRT & 1-1 psychological support.

The two randomised controlled trials formed part of the evidence which led to approval for Allen Carr's Easyway to Stop Smoking in-person Live Group Seminars use on the National Health Service (NHS). Approval was granted by England's internationally renowned National Institute for Health and Care Excellence (NICE) with the committee finding that Allen Carr's Easyway was not only effective but also cost-effective. Allen Carr's Easyway is now used by NHS/Local Council Stop Smoking Services. Further studies continue to confirm the effectiveness of the method.

Based on their full money-back guarantee (which requires two follow-up sessions without reimbursement of travel), Carr's clinics claim 90% success rate in aiding smokers to stop for three months, and 51% success rate in helping smokers stop for 12 months based on an independent study not connected with any health organisation. Celebrity endorsements include Richard Branson, Anthony Hopkins, Ashton Kutcher, Ellen DeGeneres, Mel Gibson, Nikki Glaser, Chrissie Hynde, Michael McIntyre, Pink, Jason Mraz, Charlotte Church and Hrithik Roshan which aids the organisation's efforts to expand commercially.

Allen Carr's Clinics are run by facilitators who were once smokers and have used Carr's method to stop smoking. All therapists/facilitators are members of an association created by Allen Carr's Easyway organisation, Members of the Association of Allen Carr Therapists International (MAACTI), and membership indicates that the therapist/facilitator has completed the rigorous recruitment, and the comprehensive training & development process required before anyone can practise as an Allen Carr's Easyway therapist/facilitator. They can only do so under license with Allen Carr's Easyway (International) Ltd or Allen Carr's Easyway (US) Ltd.

Carr also wrote a number of other how-to books on subjects such as losing weight, stopping alcohol consumption, and overcoming the fear of flying. Along with his close friends, protégés, & co-authors Robin Hayley (chairman, Allen Carr's Easyway) & John C. Dicey (Global CEO & Senior Allen Carr's Easyway Therapist), he wrote books dealing with gambling, debt/junk-spending, sugar addiction, emotional eating, mindfulness, tech/smartphone addiction, caffeine addiction, and vaping/JUUL with Online Video Programmes for smoking, vaping/JUUL, alcohol, cocaine, cannabis, sugar & carb addiction, emotional eating, gambling, caffeine addiction, fear of flying, and mindfulness. In 2020, it was estimated that Allen Carr's Easyway method had helped more than 50 million people worldwide. In 2021, Allen Carr's Easyway assisted the World Health Organization's year-long global campaign for World No Tobacco Day 2021.

== Illness and death ==
In 2006, Carr was diagnosed with lung cancer. His spokesman stated that this may not have been linked to his historical smoking habit, as he had been around smokers, and therefore exposed to their second-hand smoke, while treating them for their addiction. He had stated in his book "The easy way to control alcohol" chapter 16 that he was a chain-smoker for most of his adult life. The following month, Carr revealed that his lung cancer was terminal and that his life expectancy was about nine months. Carr said: "Since I smoked my final cigarette, 23 years ago, I have been the happiest man in the world. I still feel the same way today.” Carr wrote to the then British prime minister Tony Blair, urging the UK government and NHS to accept his method, saying that the "powerful influence" of lobbyists working for nicotine replacement firms had turned them against him. Carr died from lung cancer at his home in Benalmádena, west of Málaga, Spain, on 29 November 2006. He was 72 years old.

Carr worked closely with and passed responsibility for continuing his work, developing the method to cover as many addictions and issues as possible, to his close friends and long-time collaborators Robin Hayley and John C. Dicey (Chairman & Global CEO of Allen Carr's Easyway respectively).

== Selected publications ==
=== Nicotine ===
- The Easy Way to Stop Smoking (1985)
- The Only Way to Stop Smoking Permanently (1995)
- How to Stop Your Child Smoking (1999)
- The Little Book of Quitting (2000)
- The Easy Way for Women to Stop Smoking (2002)
- Allen Carr's Packing it in the Easy Way (2005)
- Allen Carr's How to be a Happy Non-smoker (2006)
- Allen Carr's I Quit (2006)
- The Illustrated Easy Way to Stop Smoking (2007)
- Allen Carr's Easy Way for Women to Stop Smoking (2007)
- The Nicotine Conspiracy (2008)
- My Stop Smoking Coach with Allen Carr (Nintendo DS, 2008)
- Stop Smoking Now Without Gaining Weight (2010)
- Allen Carr's No More Ashtrays (2011)
- Stop Smoking with Allen Carr (2012)
- Stop Smoking Now (2012)
- Allen Carr Easyway Express (2014)
- Allen Carr's Your Personal Stop Smoking Plan (2015)
- Allen Carr's Quit Smoking Boot Camp (2018)
- Allen Carr's Easyway to Quit Smoking (the most up to date version of the method) (2020)
- Allen Carr's Easyway to Quit Vaping (2021)

=== Alcohol ===
- Allen Carr's Easy Way to Control Alcohol (2001)
- Allen Carr's No More Hangovers (2009)
- The Easy Way for Women to Stop Drinking (2016)
- Allen Carr's Your Personal Stop Drinking Plan (2017)
- The Easy Way to Quit Drinking Without Willpower (2022)
- Allen Carr's Stop Drinking Now (2022)
- Allen Carr’s Easy Way to Quit Emotional Drinking (2023)

=== Overeating / unhealthy eating ===
- Allen Carr's Easyway to Lose Weight (1997)
- Allen Carr's No More Diets (2009)
- Allen Carr's Lose Weight Now: The Easy Way (2010)
- Allen Carr's Good Sugar, Bad Sugar (2016)
- The Easy Way to Quit Caffeine (2016)
- The Easy Way for Women to Lose Weight (2016)
- The Easy Way to Quit Sugar (2017)
- Allen Carr's Easyway to Quit Emotional Eating (2019)

=== Fear of flying ===
- The Easy Way to Enjoy Flying (2000)
- Allen Carr's No More Fear of Flying (2014)

=== Worry / anxiety ===
- Allen Carr's No More Worrying (2010)
- The Easy Way to Stop Worrying ..

=== Miscellaneous ===
- Burning Ambition: The Inspiring Story of One Man's Quest to Cure the World of Smoking (2007)
- Allen Carr's Easyway to Stop Gambling (2013)
- Allen Carr's Get Out of Debt Now (2014)
- Allen Carr's No More Debt (2014)
- Allen Carr's No More Gambling (2014)
- Allen Carr's Easyway to Mindfulness (2017)
- Allen Carr's Smart Phone Dumb Phone: Free Yourself from Digital Addiction (2019)
- Allen Carr’s Easyway to Quit Cocaine (2022)
- Allen Carr’s Easyway to Quit Cannabis (2022)
- Allen Carr’s Easyway to Better Sleep (2022)
- Allen Carr’s Easyway to Enjoy Exercise (2025)
