= Will (Will Smith memoir) =

2021 memoir

- Author: Will Smith with Mark Manson
- Language: English
- Publisher: Penguin Press
- Publication date: 9 November 2021
- Pages: 432
- ISBN: 9781984877925

Will is a memoir written by Will Smith along with Mark Manson. It was published on November 9, 2021.

== Reception ==
The Kirkus wrote in a review "One of Hollywood’s biggest stars delivers a memoir of success won through endless, relentless work and self-reckoning."

The Firstpost wrote in a review "While the memoir does speak of healing, there is certainly more of the dark cloud here, and less of the silver lining."
