= St. Andrew's Episcopal School (Austin, Texas) =

Location
- Upper: 5901 Southwest Parkway Austin, Texas, (Travis County), 78735 United States; Middle, Lower: 1112 West 31st Street Austin, Texas, (Travis County), 78705 United States; Upper: 30.244008°N 97.851201°W; Middle, Lower: 30.302695°N 97.748277°W

Information
- School type: K-12, Private, Parochial
- Religious affiliation: Christianity
- Denomination: Episcopalian
- Patron saint: Saint Andrew
- Established: 1952
- Educational authority: Episcopal Diocese of Texas
- CEEB code: 440343
- NCES School ID: 01325935
- Heads of school: Steven Fletcher (Upper); Tim Moore (Middle); Yvonne Russell (Lower)
- Faculty: 113
- Grades: K – 12
- Gender: Co-ed
- Age range: 5–18
- Enrollment: 941
- Average class size: Upper: 12; Middle: 15; Lower: 18
- Education system: College preparatory
- Language: English
- Campuses: Lower, Middle, Upper
- Campus size: Upper: 166 acres (67 ha); Middle, Lower: 14 acres (5.7 ha)
- Colors: Blue, black, white
- Slogan: "Dominvs Regit Me"
- Song: "St. Andrew's Fight Song"
- Athletics conference: SPC 3A
- Mascot: Highlanders (formerly Crusaders)
- Team name: Highlanders
- Rival: St. Stephen's Episcopal School
- Accreditation: Southwestern Association of Episcopal Schools (SAES); Independent Schools Association of the Southwest (ISAS)
- Publication: "Highlanders"
- Yearbook: "The Shield"
- Tuition: $26, 350 – $32,000
- Website: www.sasaustin.org

St. Andrew's Episcopal School (SAS) is a private school located in Austin, Texas, United States. St. Andrew's enrolls students in grades K-12 and is divided into three divisions: Lower (grades K-5), Middle (grades 6–8), and Upper (grades 9–12) Schools. The Lower and Middle Schools share a campus in central Austin, while the Upper School campus is in the southwestern part of the city.

== History ==
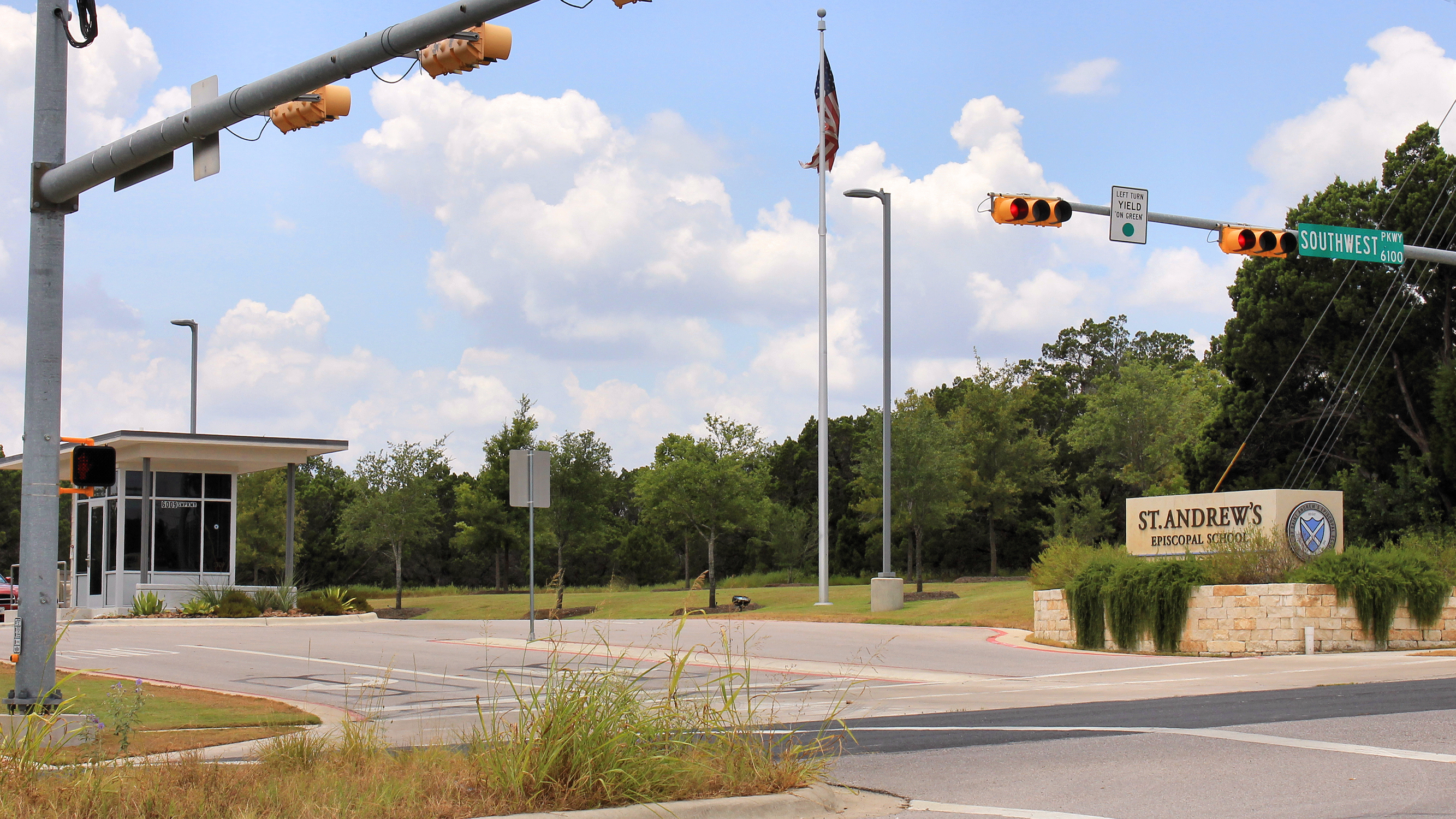
Upper school entrance

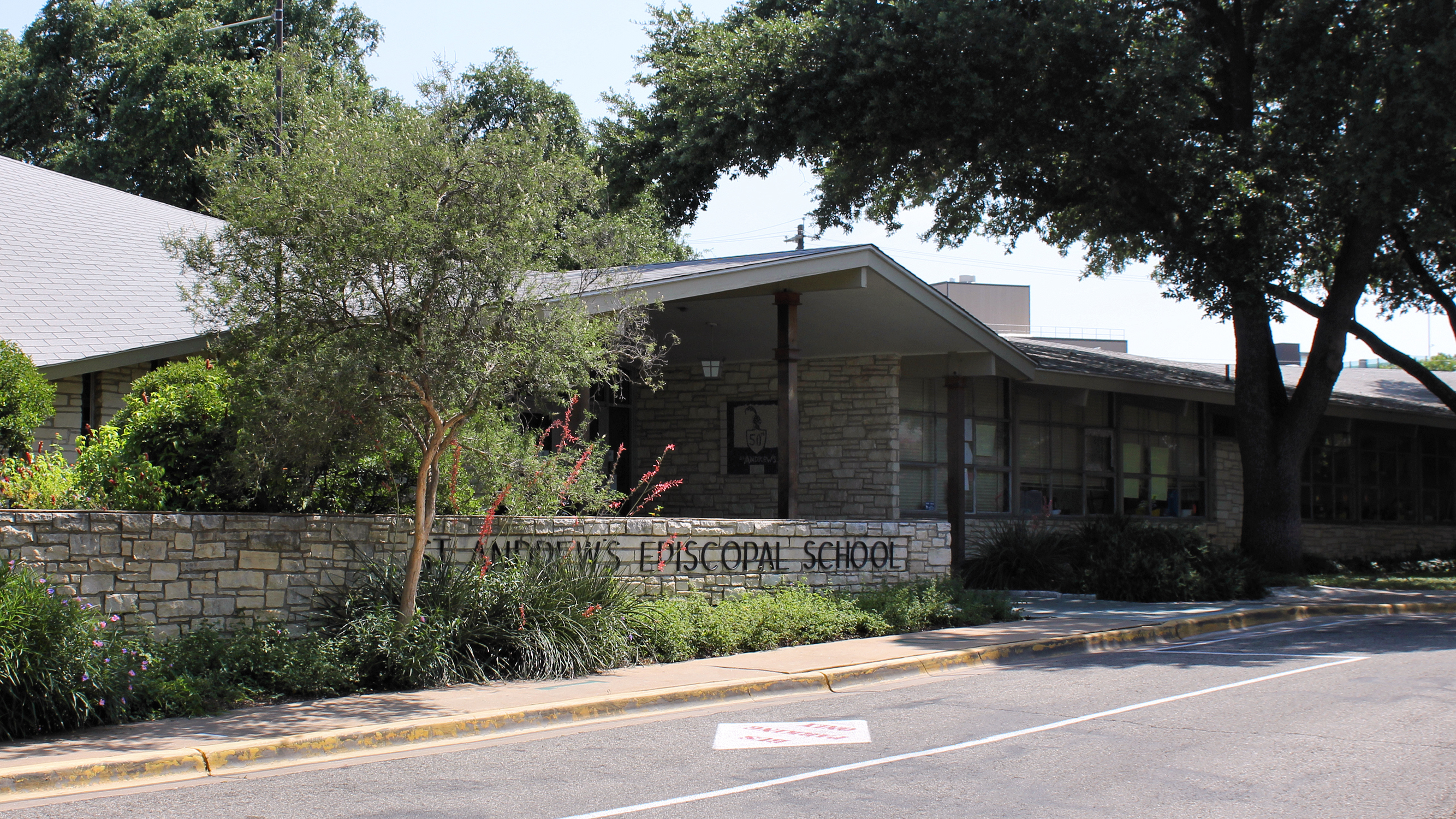
Lower and middle school

St. Andrew's Episcopal School held its first classes in a house on Pearl Street in Austin Texas. The school commenced with its first school year during the fall of 1952, serving 32 students in grades 1–3. The school later moved to 31st Street, where the Lower and Middle Schools are now currently located. The school expanded to twelve grades in 1998 with the opening of a 73-acre Upper School campus on Southwest Parkway. In 2016, a kindergarten was established on the 31st Street campus, making St. Andrew's the only K-12 Episcopal School in Central Texas.

== Academics ==
To graduate from the Upper School, students must complete a Senior Project, which takes place each May of the senior year. Seniors spend four weeks on a project of their own design with a faculty mentor, then present their work to the community in late May. Other graduation requirements include 40 hours of community service, four athletic seasons in ninth and tenth grades, and a semester of stewardship. The school also offers optional domestic and international trips through its Experiential Learning program, with recent and upcoming destinations including Yosemite Valley, Taiwan, Glacier National Park, Puerto Rico, and Greece. Each year, two St. Andrew’s students trade places with two students from Momoyama Gakuin University in Osaka, Japan, for a full academic year.

More than 65 percent of St. Andrew’s graduates attend college out of state, and the average senior completes nine applications.[7] Members of the Class of 2026 chose to attend schools including Princeton University, the Massachusetts Institute of Technology, Vanderbilt University, and the University of Texas at Austin. According to scores reported by students to Niche, the school’s average SAT is 1340, with averages of 660 in math and 680 in verbal.

== Fine arts ==
St. Andrew's offers a variety of performing opportunities at St. Andrew's, including choir, drama, and various musical ensembles. At the Upper School, Visual Arts, Music Theory, Jazz and Rock Bands, and Choir are offered as Fine Arts courses. The Choir has performed at Carnegie Hall in New York City, and the Select Choir has performed at the Washington National Cathedral in Washington, D.C. St. Andrew's was also the host of the 2013 ISAS Fine Arts Festival. They hosted the ISAS Fine Arts Festival again in 2024.

== Athletics ==
St. Andrew's athletic teams compete in the Southwest Preparatory Conference (SPC). The Upper School fields teams in football, field hockey, cross country, volleyball, basketball, soccer, swimming, baseball, golf, track and field, tennis, and lacrosse. Middle School sports include basketball, cross country, field hockey, football, golf, lacrosse, soccer, tennis, track and field, and volleyball. Physical education is required in the Lower School. The Upper School has 20+ varsity teams, 31 coaches are Full-Time SAS employees, and 80% + of student body participates on at least one team.

The softball, lacrosse, and volleyball teams ended their 2010 season ranked #1 in SPC Division II.

The Lacrosse, Basketball, and Cross country teams ended the 2024 season ranked #1 in the SPC 3A division.

== Notable alumni ==
- Barbara Pierce Bush and Jenna Bush Hager – Daughters of George W. Bush, attended Middle School
- Benjamin McKenzie – actor, The O.C. and Southland, attended Lower School
- Drew Brees – Super Bowl MVP, briefly attended Lower School, played part of one season of flag football before leaving.
- Matt Belisle – Major League Baseball player
- Mark Manson – #1 NYTimes Bestselling Author and blogger, attended Upper School
- Max Frost – Singer and musician
- Sam Selman – Major League Baseball player for the San Francisco Giants
