= The Power (self-help book) =

Self-help book by Rhonda Byrne

- Hardbook Edition cover
- Author: Rhonda Byrne
- Genre: Self-help, spiritual
- Publisher: Atria Books
- Publication date: 17 August 2010
- Publication place: Australia
- Media type: Print (hardcover, paperback), audio cassette
- Pages: 272 (first edition, hardcover)
- ISBN: 978-1439181782 (first edition, hardcover)
- Preceded by: The Secret
- Followed by: The Magic

The Power is a 2010 self-help and spirituality book written by Rhonda Byrne. It is a sequel to the 2006 book The Secret. The book was released on 17 August 2010 along with an audio-book based on it. The Power's mission statement is, "The philosophy and vision of the Secret is to bring joy to billions. To bring joy to the world, the Secret creates life-transforming tools in the mediums of books, films, and multi-media. With each creation from the Secret, we aim to share knowledge that is true, simple, and practical, and that will transform people's lives." The "Power" of the title is the power of love, the mainspring of the universe. A large portion of The Power describes how Byrne greets each blessed moment with overwhelming love and gratitude toward all creation. The book is based on the law of attraction and claims that positive thinking can create life-changing results such as increased happiness, health, and wealth. Byrne describes this as a fundamental universal law akin to gravity.

== The law of attraction ==
The law of attraction states that whatever someone experiences in life is a direct result of their thoughts. Byrne's states that it really is that simple. According to The Secret and The Power, one's thoughts and feelings have "magnetic properties" and "frequencies". They vibrate and resonate with the universe, somehow attracting events that share those frequencies. The three rules of the Law of Attraction, according to Byrne are the following: "Ask", "Believe", and "Receive". As Byrne says, it means that: "Like attracts like. What that means in simple terms for your life is: what you give out, you receive back. Whatever you give out in life is what you receive back in life. Whatever you give, by the law of attraction, is exactly what you attract back to yourself." In other words, if you want good things to happen, be a good person, think positive thoughts.

== Criticisms ==
The claims made by the book are highly controversial, and have been criticized by reviewers and readers. The book has also been heavily criticized by former believers and practitioners, with some claiming that the concept of the "Secret" was conceived by the author and that the only people generating wealth and happiness from it are the author and the publishers.

Critics contend that the book is based on a pseudoscientific theory called the "law of attraction"—the principle that "like attracts like". In a harshly critical 2010 review, The New York Times stated: "The Power and The Secret are larded with references to magnets, energy and quantum mechanics. This last is a dead giveaway: whenever you hear someone appeal to impenetrable physics to explain the workings of the mind, run away—we already have disciplines called 'psychology' and 'neuroscience' to deal with those questions. Byrne's onslaught of pseudoscientific jargon serves mostly to establish an 'illusion of knowledge,' as social scientists call our tendency to believe we understand something much better than we really do."

Jerry Adler wrote in Newsweek that The Power offers false hope to those in true need of more conventional assistance in their lives.

== See also ==
- Toxic positivity
