= Tony Robbins Foundation =

US non-profit organization

The Tony Robbins Foundation (formerly Anthony Robbins Foundation) is a charitable organization created and chaired by motivational speaker Tony Robbins. It was created in 1991 with the belief system that "regardless of stature, only those who have learned the power of sincere and selfless contribution experience life's deepest joy; true fulfilment".

The organization is also responsible for Anthony Robbins Foundation's International Basket Brigade, which according to their website, provides "baskets of food and household items for an estimated 2 million people annually in countries all over the world" "it also has products and programs estimated to be in more than 2,000 schools, 700 prisons, and 100,000 health and human service organizations. Specially, the Foundation is committed to make a difference in the quality of life for children, the homeless, the prison population, and the elderly through its various programs: International Basket Brigade, Youth Leadership Summit, UPW-Youth Leadership, Champions of Excellence, Youth Mentoring Program, Personal Power for Prisoners, and Event Scholarship."

== Reception ==
According to the independent charity assessor, Charity Navigator, the foundation had an average rating of three out of four stars for four consecutive years. In the year ending June 2009 the foundation gave $1,197,424 directly to its programs and other nonprofit groups. As of 2015, the organization is rated four out of four stars.
