= David J. Schwartz (motivational writer) =

American motivational writer and coach

- Born: David Joseph Schwartz, Jr. March 23, 1927; US
- Died: December 6, 1987 (aged 60)
- Education: BS, MA, PhD
- Alma mater: Ohio State University (MA, PhD); University of Nebraska (BS)
- Occupations: professor, life strategist, and writer
- Employer: Georgia State University
- Known for: The Magic of Thinking Big

David Joseph Schwartz Jr. (March 23, 1927 – December 6, 1987) was an American motivational writer and coach, best known for authoring The Magic of Thinking Big in 1959. He was a professor of marketing, chairman of the department, and Chair of Consumer Finance at Georgia State University.

== Biography ==
Schwartz was born on March 23, 1927 in the United States. He received a BS degree at the University of Nebraska in 1948 and his MA and then PhD in 1953 from Ohio State University.

He was a professor at Georgia State University, Atlanta, and was considered a leading American authority on motivation. He became well known through his motivational publications and self-help books, especially for The Magic of Thinking Big, published in 1959. Later, he began his own work as a self-help coach and life strategist and founded his own consultancy firm focusing on leadership development called Creative Educational Services Inc.

Georgia State University awards a scholarship in his honor.

== The Magic of Thinking Big ==
The Magic of Thinking Big, first published in 1959, is a self-help book by David J. Schwartz. The book was one of Simon & Schuster's all-time paperback best sellers and has sold over 6 million copies, It instructs people to set their goals high and think positively to achieve them.

The author gives a step-by-step guide on how to achieve what one wants by changing their thought patterns and thought habits. He explains that visualization adds value to everything and thinking big means training oneself to see not just what is, but what can be. He explains transmitting good news is win win, and we feel better and so do the people we are talking to. Lou Holtz mentions that this book helped him create his lifelong goals list. He also describes three failure diseases: excuse-itis, detail-itis and procrastination. Making better decisions and avoiding negative thoughts is the main topic of the book.

== Other publications ==
- Schwartz, David Joseph (May 1, 1983). The Magic of Getting What You Want. W. Morrow. ISBN 9780688018245.
