= The Secret (Byrne book) =

2006 book by Rhonda Byrne

- Hardcover edition
- Author: Rhonda Byrne
- Language: English
- Subject: Self-help
- Publisher: Atria Books; Beyond Words Publishing
- Publication date: 26 November 2006
- Publication place: Australia
- Media type: Print (hardcover · paperback); audio cassette; CD; ebook (Kindle)
- Pages: 198 (first edition, hardcover)
- ISBN: 978-1582701707
- Dewey Decimal: 131 22
- LC Class: BF639 .B97 2006
- Followed by: The Power

The Secret is a 2006 self-help book by Rhonda Byrne, based on the earlier film of the same name. It is based on the belief of the pseudoscientific law of attraction, which claims that thought alone can influence objective circumstances within one's life. The book alleges energy as assurance of its effectiveness. The book has sold 30 million copies worldwide and has been translated into 50 languages. Scientific claims made in the book have been rejected by a range of critics, who argue that the book has no scientific foundation.

== Background ==
The Secret was released as a film in March 2006, and later the same year as a book. The book is influenced by Wallace Wattles' 1910 book The Science of Getting Rich, which Byrne received from her daughter during a time of personal trauma, in 2004. The New York Times bestselling authors of The Passion Test, Janet Bray Attwood and Chris Attwood, are not featured in the film or the book, but arranged 36 of the 52 interviews for the film, many of which are referenced in the book.

The book served as the basis for the 2020 film The Secret: Dare to Dream.

== Synopsis ==
Byrne re-introduces a notion originally popularized by persons such as Madame Blavatsky and Norman Vincent Peale that thinking about certain things will make them appear in one's life. Byrne provides examples of historical persons who have allegedly achieved this. Byrne cites a three-step process: ask, believe, and receive. This is based on a quotation from the Bible's Matthew 21:22: "Whatever you ask for in prayer with faith, you will receive."

Byrne highlights the importance of gratitude and visualization in achieving one's desires, along with alleged examples. Later chapters describe how to improve one's prosperity, relationships, and health, with more general thoughts about the universe.

== Reception ==
=== Gross ===
The book has been translated into 50 languages and has sold over 30 million copies. Due partly to an appearance on The Oprah Winfrey Show, the book and film had grossed $300 million in sales by 2009. Byrne has subsequently released Secret merchandise and several related books.

=== Critical response ===
American TV host Oprah Winfrey is a proponent of the book. On The Larry King Show she said that the message of The Secret is the message she has been trying to share with the world on her show for the past 21 years. Byrne was later invited to her show along with people who swear by The Secret.

Valerie Frankel of Good Housekeeping wrote an article about her trying the principles of The Secret for four weeks. While she reached some of her goals, others had not improved. Frankel's final assessment is: "Counting my blessings has been uplifting, reminding me of what's already great about my life. Visualization has forced me to pay attention to what I really desire. And laughing is never a bad idea. If you ignore The Secret's far-too-simplistic maxims (no, you will not be doomed to a miserable life for thinking negative thoughts) and the hocus-pocus (the cosmos isn't going to deliver a new car; it's busy), there's actually some helpful advice in the book. But it's nothing you don't already know."

In 2009, Barbara Ehrenreich published Bright-Sided: How the Relentless Promotion of Positive Thinking Has Undermined America as a reaction to self-help books such as The Secret, claiming that they promote political complacency and a failure to engage with reality.

Mark Manson, author of The Subtle Art of Not Giving a Fuck, has criticised The Secret, writing that the book is "full of misplaced clichés, silly quotes, and superstitious drivel", calling it a "playbook for entitlement and self-absorption" and adds that "anybody who reads it and implements its advice [...] will likely make themselves worse off in the long run".

John G. Stackhouse Jr. has provided historical context, locating Byrne's book in the tradition of New Thought and popular religion, and concluding that "it isn't new, and it isn't a secret".

Byrne's scientific claims, in particular concerning quantum physics, have been rejected by a range of authors including Christopher Chabris and Daniel Simons at The New York Times and Harvard physicist Lisa Randall. Mary Carmichael and Ben Radford, writing for the Center for Inquiry, have also pointed out that The Secret has no scientific foundation, stating that Byrne's book represents "a time-worn trick of mixing banal truisms with magical thinking and presenting it as some sort of hidden knowledge: basically, it's the new New Thought."

== See also ==
- Toxic positivity
