= Ramit Sethi =

American blogger and writer (born 1982)

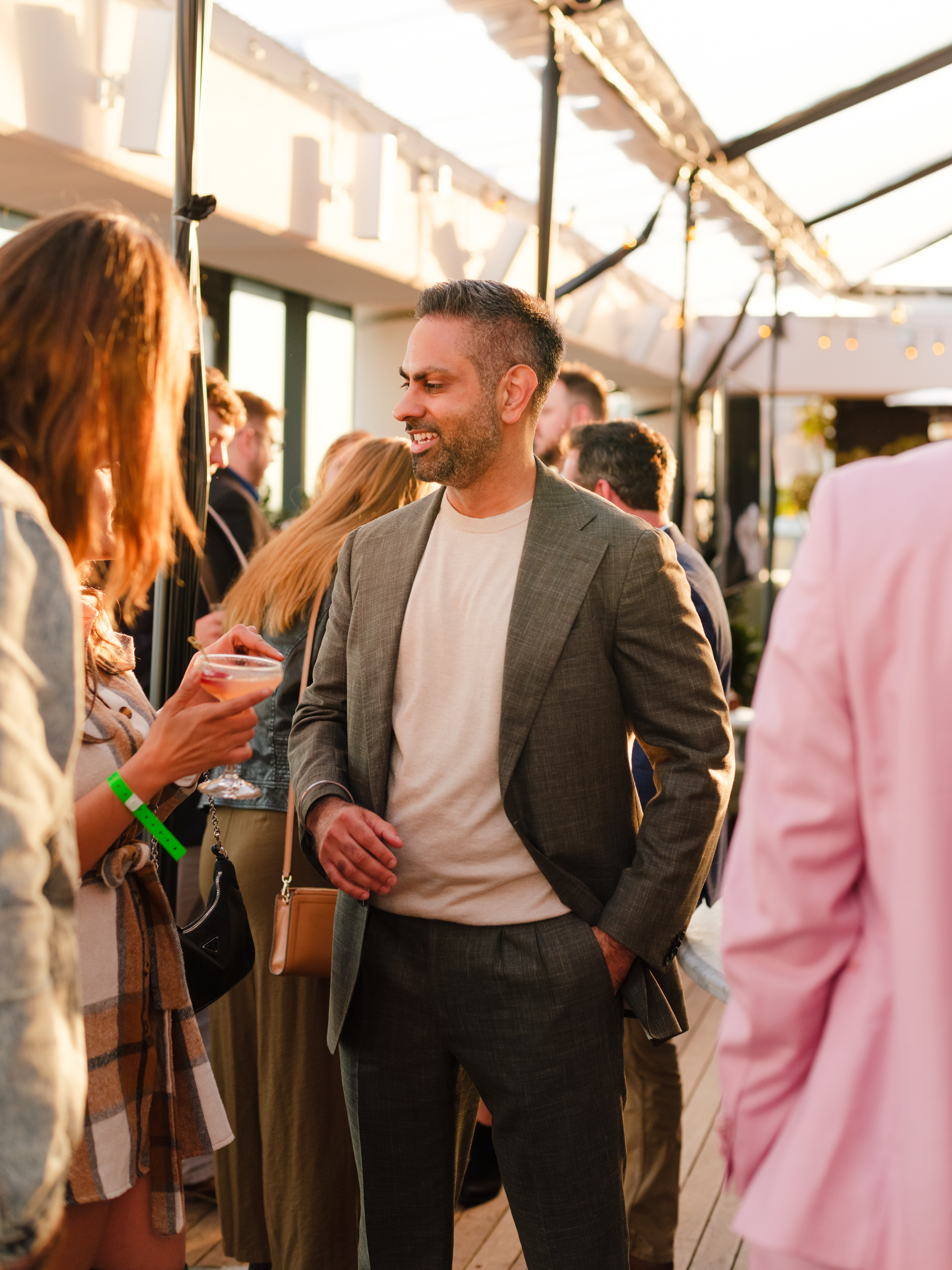
- Born: June 30, 1982 (age 43); California, United States
- Education: Stanford University (BA, MA)
- Occupation: Writer
- Known for: Blogging
- Spouse: Cassandra Campa (m. 2018)

Ramit Singh Sethi (born June 30, 1982) is an American author, entrepreneur, and media personality. He is the author of the 2009 New York Times Best Seller, I Will Teach You to Be Rich, host of the I Will Teach You To Be Rich podcast, and host of the 2023 Netflix series titled How to Get Rich. He previously co-founded PBworks, a commercial wiki website.

== Personal life and education ==
Sethi attended Bella Vista High School in Fair Oaks, California. In 2004, he graduated from Stanford University with a Bachelor of Arts (Information & Society) in Science, Technology & Society with a minor in Psychology. In 2005 he received a Master of Arts in sociology (Social Psychology and Interpersonal Processes), also from Stanford.

In 2018, Sethi married Cassandra Campa.

== Books, Podcast and TV ==
In 2009, Sethi released I Will Teach You to Be Rich. He re-released an updated version in 2019. The book was ranked #3 on the New York Times Best Sellers list in August 2023. In 2022, he released an updated edition of the book titled I Will Teach You to Be Rich: The Journal, focusing on financial management and including practical exercises and motivational content.

He also hosts the podcast I Will Teach You To Be Rich in which he speaks with couples as they navigate financial stress. On April 18, 2023, a date chosen to coincide with National Tax Day in the United States, a Netflix series was released titled How to Get Rich in which Sethi gives personal and financial advice to people.
