= Robin Norwood =

American author

Robin Norwood (born July 27, 1945) is the author of the international best-selling book, Women Who Love Too Much as well as Letters from Women Who Love Too Much, Daily Meditations for Women Who Love Too Much (illustrated by Richard Torregrossa) and Why Me? Why This? Why Now?. She was a licensed family and marriage therapist.

== Career ==
=== Marriage and family therapist ===
Robin Norwood is a licensed marriage and family therapist who worked in the field of addiction for fifteen years. She specialized in treating co-alcoholism and relationship addiction. She lives on a ranch in the central coast area of California.

=== Books ===
Robin Norwood's books have been translated into over thirty languages and continue to sell worldwide. Women Who Love Too Much was a number one seller on the New York Times Best Seller list with over three million copies in print worldwide.
