= Tony Robbins =

American motivational speaker (born 1960)

- Robbins in 2019
- Born: Anthony J. Mahavorić; February 29, 1960 (age 66); North Hollywood, California, U.S.
- Occupations: Author; motivational speaker
- Years active: 1977–present
- Known for: Motivational speaking
- Notable work: Unlimited Power, Awaken the Giant Within, Money Master the Game
- Spouses: Becky Robbins (m. 1984–1998) Sage Robbins (m. 2001)
- Children: 5

Anthony Jay Robbins (born Anthony J. Mahavorić, February 29, 1960) is an American author, coach and motivational speaker. He is known for his seminars and self-help books, including the books Unlimited Power (1986), Awaken the Giant Within (1991), and Money Master the Game (2014). He has also appeared in television shows, owns wellness companies, and has done philanthropy.

He was named one of the "Top 50 Business Intellectuals" by Accenture and one of the "Top 200 Business Gurus" by the Harvard Business Press, and in 2007 was ranked on the Forbes Celebrity 100. In 2015 and 2016 Robbins was listed on the Worth Magazine Power 100 list.

== Early life and education ==
Robbins was born Anthony J. Mahavorić in North Hollywood, California, on February 29, 1960. He was the eldest of three children and his parents divorced when Robbins was seven. His mother remarried several times, including a marriage with Jim Robbins, a former semi-professional baseball player who legally adopted Anthony when he was 12. He is of Croatian descent from both sides of his family.

Robbins attended Glendora High School. He was elected student body president in his senior year. While growing up, Robbins worked as a handyman to help provide for his siblings. During high school, he grew 10 inches (25 cm) in one year, a growth spurt later attributed to a pituitary tumor. He has said his home life was "chaotic" and "abusive". When he was 17, he left home and never returned. He later worked as a janitor, and did not attend college.

== Business career ==
=== Motivational speaking ===
Robbins began working for motivational speaker and author Jim Rohn when he was 17 years old. He continued to work for him by promoting Rohn's seminars until the age of 22.

He trained with John Grinder and utilized a few ideas from neuro-linguistic programming as part of his own self-help and motivational speaking programs. However, by 1992 Robbins had switched to his own technique, which he called neuro-associative conditioning (NAC). He felt that "programming" suggested that the person had been fixed once and for all by someone else, meanwhile "conditioning" was instead a self-improvement technique.

Eventually, Robbins began to teach self-improvement seminars himself. He subsequently learned to firewalk in 1983 from Tolly Burkan and incorporated it into his seminars. Between 1983 and 1985, Robbins went from making $40,000 to over $1 million yearly, and was earning more than $60,000 an appearance by 1991.

Some of Robbins's teachings consisted of encouraging listeners to set goals, speak positively to themselves and others, eat healthier, and to imitate successful people. He hosted several infomercials, advertising his philosophy of "constant, never ending improvement", which he called "CAN-I!" His infomercials were viewed by an estimate of 100 million people in 200 markets. They featured several celebrity appearances or endorsers, including actor LeVar Burton, politician Claudine Schneider, and author Charles J. Givens. He also sold audiotapes and video seminars. He described himself as "not a guru", but rather "a coach, or a friend".

Robbins speaking at a motivational event in Dubai

Robbins has worked on an individual basis with Bill Clinton, Justin Tuck, Hugh Jackman, and Pitbull. He has counseled businessmen Peter Guber, Steve Wynn, and Marc Benioff.

==== Firewalking incident ====
In July 2012, the San Jose Mercury News published a story reporting that several people had been burned and hospitalized during one of Robbins's fire-walking events on July 19, 2012. This story was picked up by other media outlets, including Fox News, The New York Times, and CNN. Aspects of these reports were later challenged by Robbins himself along with some of the on-site medical professionals.

On June 24, 2016, it was reported that "dozens were burned and required medical attention after attempting to walk on hot coals during a fire-walking event at a Tony Robbins seminar in Dallas, Texas". A spokeswoman for the Robbins organization stated, "Someone unfamiliar with the process of the fire-walk called 911 reporting the need for emergency service vehicles ... there was no need for emergency personnel ... only 5 of 7,000 participants requested an examination beyond what was readily available on site."

=== Books ===
Robbins has written several books; his most famous works include Unlimited Power, Awaken the Giant Within, and Money: Master the Game. His books cover decision-making, emotional regulation, goal setting, and personal finance management.

His book Money: Master the Game was published in 2014, and reached number one on a The New York Times' bestseller list in December 2014, and went on to sell a million copies in its first year. The book contains information stemming from his interviews with over 50 financial experts.

=== Film and television ===
Robbins made a cameo appearance in the 2001 movie Shallow Hal.

In July 2010, NBC debuted Breakthrough with Tony Robbins, a reality show that followed Robbins as he helped the show's participants face their personal challenges. NBC canceled the show after airing two of the planned six episodes due to low viewership of 2.8 million. In March 2012, the OWN Network picked up the show for another season beginning with the original first season set to re-run and thereafter leading directly into the new 2012 season.

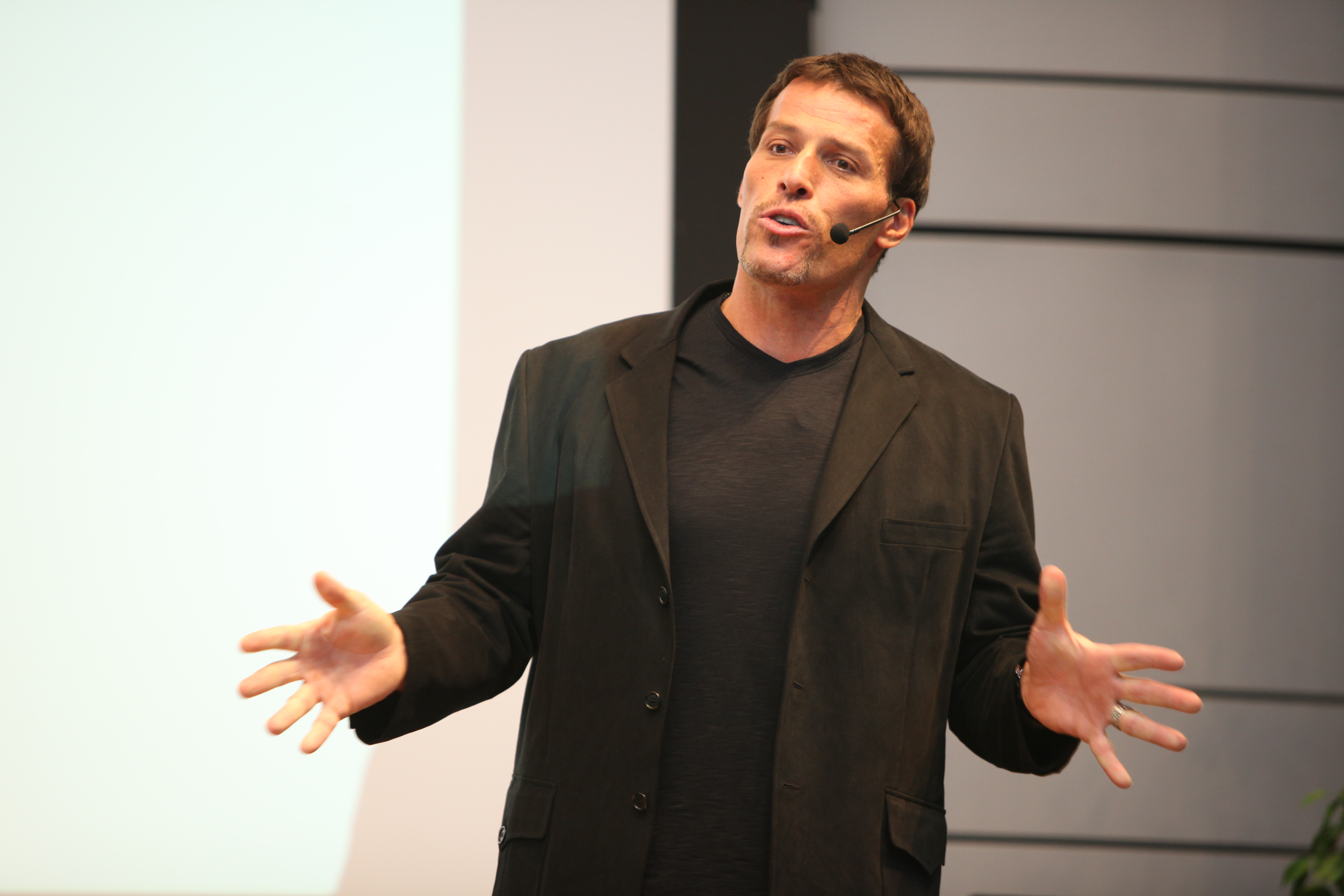
Robbins in 2009

In April 2012, Robbins began co-hosting Oprah's Lifeclass on the OWN Network.

Robbins' 2014 event "Date with Destiny" in Boca Raton, Florida was the basis for the documentary Tony Robbins: I Am Not Your Guru, directed and produced by Joe Berlinger. It premiered at the South by Southwest film festival in March 2016 and was released by Netflix on July 15, 2016.

=== Sports ownership ===
In 2014, Robbins joined a group of investors to acquire rights to launch a Major League Soccer franchise in Los Angeles referred to as the Los Angeles Football Club. The team entered competition in 2018.

In 2016, Robbins partnered with Golden State Warriors co-owner Peter Guber and Washington Wizards co-owner Ted Leonsis to purchase Team Liquid, an eSports professional gaming organization.

=== Hotel and wellness companies ===
Robbins is involved with the Robbins-Madanes Center for Strategic Intervention, which focuses on personal, family, and organizational psychology, and claims to help people "find breakthrough strategies and solutions for overcoming the problems that confront us all."

In 2024, Robbins worked with Sam Nazarian to open a hotel brand called The Estate. The hotel is partnered with Robbins' diagnostic firm Fountain Life which does luxury medical testing. The initial locations of the hotel are in 13 locations across the U.S. with the first location opening in Los Angeles. The Estate is focused on longevity science and offers health diagnostics, wellness coaching, and advanced blood diagnostics among other services.

=== Philanthropy ===
In 1991, Robbins founded the Anthony Robbins Foundation (now the Tony Robbins Foundation), to help young people, homeless people, hungry people, elderly people, and imprisoned people. In 2014, he donated the profits of his book, Money: Master the Game, along with an additional personal donation, through Feeding America to provide meals to people in need. Robbins helped raise money for Operation Underground Railroad.

== Personal life ==
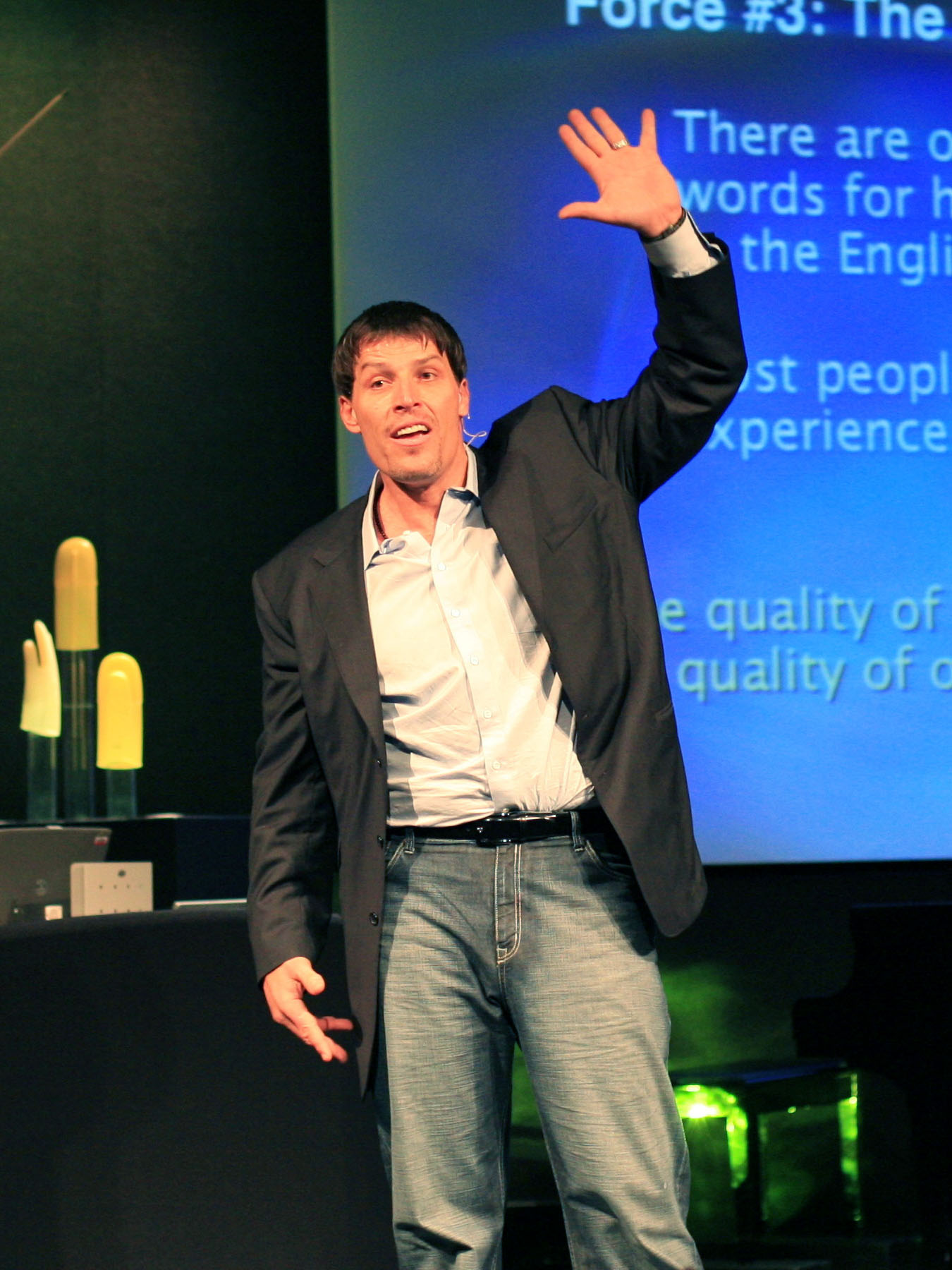
Robbins at TED Convention in 2006

Robbins' first child was with girlfriend Liz Acosta. Their son, Jairek Robbins, born in 1984, is also a personal empowerment coach and trainer. In 1984, Robbins married Rebecca Jenkins after meeting her at a seminar. Jenkins had three children, from two former marriages, whom Robbins adopted. Robbins and Jenkins filed for divorce in 1998. In October 2001, Robbins married Bonnie Sage Humphrey Robbins. They live in Manalapan, Florida, and had a daughter in 2021.

Robbins says he believes in God, however he has not explicitly stated his religion.

Robbins was a vegan for 12 years; he then reportedly added fish to his diet. While eating a fish-heavy diet, he developed mercury poisoning and nearly died. His diet now consists of mostly vegetables with a small amount of animal protein. Robbins' net worth is estimated to be around $600 million. He owns the Namale Resort and Spa which is located in Fiji. Robbins is a licensed helicopter pilot. In a 2013 interview with Playboy magazine, Robbins disclosed that he had been diagnosed with acromegaly at age 31, but refused his doctor's recommendation to undergo brain surgery. Robbins is 6 feet 7 inches (2.01 m) tall.

== Legal issues ==
In May 1995, Robbins Research International (RRI) settled with the Federal Trade Commission over alleged violations of the agency's Franchise Rule. Under the settlement, RRI did not admit to having violated any law, but agreed to pay $221,260 in consumer redress.

In 2000, Wade Cook sued Robbins for allegedly using copyrighted terms from Cook's book Wall Street Money Machine in his seminars. A jury awarded Cook a $655,900 judgment, which was appealed. Cook and Robbins settled for an undisclosed amount.

In May 2019, an investigation by BuzzFeed News detailed accusations against Robbins of the sexual harassment and assault of fans and staff members, such as groping fans at events and exposing his genitals to his assistants. Robbins denied the allegations and said, "I have been the target of a year-long investigation by BuzzFeed. Unfortunately, your organization has made it clear to my team that you intend to move forward with publishing an inaccurate, agenda-driven version of the past, pierced with falsehoods." In November 2019, BuzzFeed News published a six-part article accusing Robbins of molesting a teenage girl during his time as a "star speaker" at SuperCamp, an elite summer camp in southern California. The article states that the events took place in 1985 when Robbins was 25, and that there were at least two eyewitnesses. Robbins denied wrongdoing and sued BuzzFeed News in Ireland. In response, BuzzFeed News said that it stood by its reporting and suggested that Robbins's decision to file the summons in Ireland was an "abuse" of the Irish court. Robbins's lawyers filed a notice of discontinuance in 2025.

== Select bibliography ==
- Unlimited Power: The New Science of Personal Achievement (1986). Free Press. ISBN 0-684-84577-6.
- Awaken the Giant Within (1991). Simon & Schuster. ISBN 0671791540.
- Giant Steps (1994). Touchstone. ISBN 0671891049.
- Money: Master the Game (2014). Simon & Schuster. ISBN 1476757801.
- Co-authored with Peter Mallouk (2017). Unshakeable: Your Financial Freedom Playbook. Simon & Schuster. ISBN 1501164589.
- Co-authored with Peter Mallouk (2020). The Path: Accelerating Your Journey to Financial Freedom. Post Hill Press. ISBN 1642937010.
- Co-authored with Peter Diamandis and Robert Hariri (2022). Life Force: How New Breakthroughs in Precision Medicine Can Transform the Quality of Your Life & Those You Love. Simon & Schuster. ISBN 9781982121709.
