= Women Who Love Too Much =

1985 book by Robin Norwood

- 1990 edition
- Author: Robin Norwood
- Genre: Self-Help
- Publication date: 1985

Women Who Love Too Much is a self-help book by licensed marriage and family therapist Robin Norwood published in 1985.

The book, which was a number one seller on the New York Times Best Seller list's "advice and miscellaneous" category in 1987, is credited with "spawn[ing] a cottage industry in the therapy community." Its premise, that women who get "mired in obsessive relationships" are to help themselves, was criticized by some feminist scholars.

It was written by Robin Norwood back in 1985 and was republished in paperback by Pocket Books in April of 2008.

== See also ==
- Codependence
