= James Clear =

American author (born 1986)

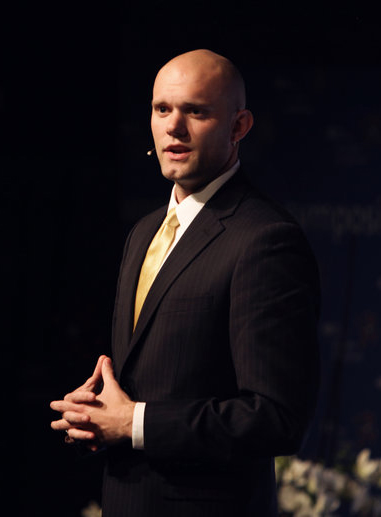
- Clear in 2010
- Born: January 22, 1986 (age 40); Hamilton, Ohio, U.S.
- Education: Denison University (ISA); Ohio State University (MBA)
- Occupations: Author; Writer; Speaker
- Years active: 2012–present
- Known for: Atomic Habits
- Website: jamesclear.com

James Clear (born January 22, 1986) is an American writer. Raised in Hamilton, Ohio, and receiving education from Denison University and Ohio State University, he is known for his 2018 self-help book Atomic Habits.

== Early life and education ==
James Clear lived on a farm with his grandparents. Raised in Hamilton, Ohio, Clear received his degree in biomechanics from Denison University in 2008, where he was the captain of the baseball team. After completing his undergraduate studies, Clear transferred to Ohio State University, where he would receive his MBA degree. During his time at university, he took part in the St. Gallen Symposium twice and won the Global Essay Competition in his second year attending.

== Career ==
On November 12, 2012, Clear began publishing articles on his official website. Its growing popularity caught the attention of Penguin Random House, who gave Clear a publishing deal for his book, Atomic Habits that was released in 2018.

== Personal life ==
Clear lives in Columbus.
