= Surrendered wife =

2001 book by Laura Doyle

The Surrendered Wives movement is inspired by a book, The Surrendered Wife by Laura Doyle. Its supporters suggest that women should relinquish what Doyle deems to be inappropriate control of their husbands and focus on their own happiness in order to bring romance and intimacy back to their relationship.

== Philosophy ==
The author of the core book of this movement maintains that she does not advocate submissiveness or the surrendering of one's self (see contradictions of this claim below); she proposes the surrendering of control over others. Indeed, in Things Will Get as Good as You Can Stand (subtitled When you learn that it is better to receive than to give– The Superwoman's Practical Guide to Getting as Much as She Gives), Doyle says women turn away praise, validation, and even help to appear to be in control.

The author writes:

Like millions of women, Laura Doyle wanted her marriage to be better. But when she tried to get her husband to be more romantic, helpful, and ambitious, he withdrew– and she was lonely and exhausted from controlling everything. Desperate to be in love with her man again, she decided to stop telling him what to do and how to do it. When Doyle surrendered control, something magical happened. The union she had always dreamed of appeared. The man who had wooed her was back.
The underlying principle of The Surrendered Wife is simple: The control women wield at work and with children must be left at the front door of any marriage. Laura Doyle's model for matrimony shows women how they can both express their needs and have them met while also respecting their husband's choices. When they do, they revitalize intimacy.

The "Surrendered Wives" movement is centered on six basic principles:

1. a wife relinquishes control of her husband's life
2. she respects his decisions for his life
3. she practices good self-care (she does at least three things a day for her own enjoyment)
4. she practices expressing gratitude (thanking her husband for the things he does)
5. a surrendered wife is not afraid to show her vulnerability and take the feminine approach
6. she trusts him to handle household finances

Having female support is cited by Doyle as a critical component for success for the woman who chooses to surrender.

== Criticism and praise ==
Her critics see Doyle as advocating that women should be submissive to their husbands. Former Australian Human Rights and Equal Opportunity Commission Sex Discrimination Commissioner Pru Goward compared the movement to slavery saying "There is no such thing as an adult who can entirely subvert themselves to another person. That's called slavery and I think we abolished that several hundred years ago." She also claimed "If a man wants that sort of relationship, he actually doesn't want a relationship, he wants a doll. He wants a puppet, he wants total control and that's not the definition of a relationship."

Doyle responds that many critics appear to have little knowledge of the principles described in the book and simply react to what they imagine the book says.

Supporters argue that taken in balance, the program works for them or even saved their relationships.

== Sequel ==
The Surrendered Single is a book to help single women attract a good man according to the principles of Surrendering. Doyle advocates the surrender of control of another. A surrendered single is a woman who chooses to apply the principles of surrendering to her life so as to serenely attract a good man rather than desperately seek a mate.
