= I'm Dysfunctional, You're Dysfunctional =

1992 book by Wendy Kaminer

- Cover of the first edition
- Author: Wendy Kaminer
- Language: English
- Subject: Self-help industry
- Publisher: Addison-Wesley
- Publication date: June 1992
- Publication place: United States
- Media type: Print (hardcover and paperback)
- Pages: 180
- ISBN: 0-201-57062-9
- Followed by: It's All the Rage: Crime and Culture

I'm Dysfunctional, You're Dysfunctional: The Recovery Movement and Other Self-Help Fashions is a non-fiction book about the self-help industry, written by Wendy Kaminer. The book was first published in a hardcover format in 1992 by Addison-Wesley, and again in a paperback format in 1993, by Vintage Books.

== Content ==
The book is a strong critique of the self-help movement, and focuses criticism on other books on the subject matter, including topics of codependency and twelve-step programs. The author addresses the social implications of a society engaged in these types of solutions to their problems, and argues that they foster passivity, social isolation, and attitudes contrary to democracy. Of the self-help movement, Kaminer writes: "At its worst, the recovery movement's cult of victimization mocks the notion of social justice by denying that there are degrees of injustice." Kaminer also criticizes the lack of a free-forum for debate and reasoning within these groups, noting that those who disagree with the tenets of the organization are immediately branded "in denial", similar to the way a fundamentalist might characterize a free-thinker as a heretic. Kaminer gives a deconstruction of the history and methodology of some of these groups, which are depicted in the book as simplistic and narcissistic. She blames New Age thinking for encouraging "psychologies of victimization." She explains a two-step process used to write a popular self-help book: First, "Promote the prevailing preoccupation of the time" (either health or wealth), and then "Package platitudes about positive thinking, prayer or affirmation therapy as sure-fire, scientific techniques." Kaminer maintains that self-help has negative effects on both politics and personal development.

Kaminer acknowledges that there are those who have real problems and receive benefit from groups such as Alcoholics Anonymous, but she also "picks apart the tenets of the recovery religion – for she sees striking parallels with religious fundamentalism." In addition to Alcoholics Anonymous and the codependency movement, other books and self-help movements critiqued in the book include Norman Vincent Peale's 1952 book The Power of Positive Thinking and Werner Erhard's Erhard Seminars Training "est" organization. The writings of Mary Baker Eddy, and Napoleon Hill's Think and Grow Rich are also analyzed and critiqued. Though Kaminer "ridiculed the excesses of self-help psychology and theology," she approved of the motivational work done by Rabbi Harold Kushner. Kaminer criticized the effect that talk shows have on American society, and recounted how a producer for The Oprah Winfrey Show coached participants to "jump in" and interrupt each other on the show. Kaminer writes that it is not the content that appears on talk shows that is the problem, but rather that "they claim to do so much more than entertain; they claim to inform and explain. They dominate the mass marketplace and make it one that is inimical to ideas." At the time of the book's publication, Kaminer cited a statistic from industry sources asserting that ninety-six percent of the population in the United States were victims of codependency and warped family upbringing.

== Reception ==
The book received a favorable review in Library Journal, where it was described as: "A distinctive and highly recommended title," and compared to Alternative Titles and Making Room for the Recovery Boom. A review in the Times Union called I'm Dysfunctional, You're Dysfunctional a "keenly perceptive book," and wrote: "Wendy Kaminer has written a book that is reasoned, analytical, insightful, and filled with original thought – in short, everything the recovery movement is not." An article in the Los Angeles Times noted that the choice of title for the book: "expresses Kaminer's contempt for the recovery movement," but criticized the movement without offering solutions. Michiko Kakutani of The New York Times described the book as "a terrifically witty, intelligent and cogent assessment of the recovery movement and its implications for American society at large." The Houston Chronicle called the book "smartly ironic," and noted that Kaminer "offered up the recovery movement with its penchant for self-help and public confession as a prime example of irrationality."

Johnson's On Being a Mentor called the work "a popular spoof of the self-help book craze." In Jon Winokur's Encyclopedia Neurotica, he cites Kaminer's book for a definition of the term "recovery movement." Yardley's Monday Morning Quarterback called the work a "send-up of pop psychology," and Algernon Austin's Achieving Blackness called it an "anti-pop psychology book." In his book Coming Home Again, Geoffrey S. Proehl wrote that Kaminer's work belonged within a "critique of American sentimentalism," placing it within the same context as Leslie Fiedler's Love, Death and the American Novel, and Ann Douglas's The Feminization of American Culture. In A Disease of One's Own, John Steadman Rice criticized Kaminer for using the term "recovery movement" in ways that "artificially lump new twelve-step groups, such as Co-Dependents Anonymous, together with established groups like Alcoholics Anonymous." Kaminer herself was criticized as a result of the book, with some labeling her "in deep denial," or "part of the backlash." In her book Diseases of the Will, Mariana Valverde described some of the arguments put forth in the book as "a clever polemic against recovery from the point of view of an enlightened rationalism." In Linda Farris Kurtz's Self-Help and Support Groups, she described the book as "a wide-ranging but somewhat unbalanced critique of recovery groups and recovery literature." Robert H. Vasoli's What God Has Joined Together characterized the work as "a lurid and incisive critique."

The book was highlighted among The New York Times' "Notable Books of the Year 1992," where it was described as: "a witty, occasionally harsh account of people who call their troubles diseases and blame other people for them." I'm Dysfunctional, You're Dysfunctional has later been cited by other books that also criticize the self-help movement. In his 2005 book, Sham: How The Self-Help Movement Made America Helpless, author Steve Salerno cites Kaminer while critiquing the effects of victimization on American culture.

== See also ==
- Folk psychology
- Popular psychology
- Propositional attitude
- Psychobabble
- Self-help
