= Unlimited Power (book) =

1986 self-help book by Tony Robbins

- 1987 Fawcett Columbine paperback edition
- Author: Tony Robbins
- Publisher: Simon & Schuster
- Publication date: June 15, 1986
- Media type: Paperback/Hardcover
- ISBN: 0671610880
- OCLC: 32004670

Unlimited Power is the first self-help book by American writer and motivational speaker Anthony (Tony) Robbins. The original hardcover edition was released on June 15, 1986 by Simon & Schuster; the subsequent paperbacks were published by Fawcett Columbine, an imprint of Ballantine Books.

Kirkus Reviews reviewed the book.

In 1997, a new version co-authored by Joseph McClendon III and entitled Unlimited Power: A Black Choice was released for the African-American community. This adaptation was reviewed by Publishers Weekly in 2021.

== See also ==
- Awaken the Giant Within
