= I Will Teach You to Be Rich =

2009 personal finance book by Ramit Sethi

- Author: Ramit Sethi
- Genre: personal finance
- Website: www.iwillteachyoutoberich.com

I Will Teach You To Be Rich is a 2009 personal finance book by Ramit Sethi, who writes a blog of the same name. The book, published by Workman became a New York Times Bestseller.

== Critical reception ==
In a 2019 New York Times column on the updated edition, Paul B. Brown wrote that the original 2009 book "didn't get as much attention as it deserved," but that Sethi's "bragging" and a tone that "alternated between hectoring and belittling" were flaws that "remain" in the new edition.

Brown added that readers who can "ignore the vitriol" will find that "the four major points he emphasizes are worth paying attention to."

== Reviews ==
- Gordon, Whitson. "I Will Teach You To Be Rich: A Solid Intro to Money Management". Lifehacker.
- "Book Review: Will This Guy Really Teach You to be Rich?". Mr. Money Mustache. 2011-11-06.
- "Review of I Will Teach You To Be Rich by Ramit Sethi". www.johngarvens.com. 11 August 2013.
- Babwani, Sakina (2014). "Book Review: Ramit Sethi's 'I Will Teach You to be Rich' a beginner's guide to managing money". The Economic Times.
- "Review: I Will Teach You to Be Rich - The Simple Dollar". The Simple Dollar. 2009-03-22.
