= The Happiness Trap =

2007 book by Dr. Russ Harris

- Author: Dr. Russ Harris, M.D.
- Language: English
- Genre: Self Help, Psychology
- Publisher: Exisle Publishing
- Publication date: March 1, 2007
- Pages: 280 (1st ed.)
- ISBN: 978-0-908-98890-7 (1st ed.)
- Website: https://thehappinesstrap.com/

The Happiness Trap: Stop Struggling, Start Living is a 2007 self-help book by physician and therapist Russ Harris. The text introduces acceptance and commitment therapy (ACT) techniques aimed at addressing anxiety, self-doubt, and psychological flexibility. It has sold over a million copies, has been translated into over 30 languages, and is currently in its second edition.

== Background ==
Russ Harris grew up in England and studied medicine at Newcastle University. After graduating, he began practicing as a GP, eventually emigrating to Australia in 1991. Through his work in both England and Australia, Harris became interested in Psychoneuroimmunology, the study of the connection between the mind and the nervous and immune systems of the human body. This led him to the work of Jon Kabat-Zinn and his program of mindfulness-based stress reduction.

“As a young GP, I was pretty depressed. I was pretty miserable. I’d achieved this medical degree and this job that gave me income and status and privilege and I thought that should make me happy, right? But it didn’t. I was wracked with self-doubt and anxiety and imposter syndrome so I started reading self-help books to try and understand why."

He began teaching mindfulness techniques to his patients and became progressively disillusioned with writing prescriptions. After finding out about acceptance and commitment therapy, he traveled to the United States to train with the creators of the ACT model, Steven C. Hayes and Kelly Wilson.

"It was interesting because my consultations were getting longer and longer and I was spending less and less time on the physical aspects of health, and more and more time on the psychological aspects – and I started to think maybe I’m actually in the wrong profession here. It was the psychology of health that really interested me.”

Gradually, Harris retrained as a therapist and life coach. Wanting to bring an accessible guide to ACT to as many people as possible, he wrote The Happiness Trap and eventually published it with Exisle Publishing in 2007.

In the years that followed, Harris established an accompanying online program.

== Synopsis ==
In The Happiness Trap, Harris guides the reader through all the cornerstones of acceptance and commitment therapy. He begins by discussing why it is so hard to be happy, outlining that the human brain is wired for suffering and that attaining peak happiness is a myth which can contribute to, rather than negate, one's own suffering.

He then outlines the core philosophy of ACT: rather than trying to eliminate negative thoughts and feelings, it is more valuable to learn to live with them and use mindfulness techniques to gain a detached and more objective view of one's experiences. In a journal article he wrote for Psychotherapy in Australia ahead of the release of The Happiness Trap he wrote: "ACT interventions focus around two main processes: 1) developing acceptance of unwanted private experiences which are out of personal control, 2) commitment and action towards living a valued life". The goal of ACT then is to detach from the distractions, negative thoughts and painful feelings the brain is predisposed to, and reorient towards finding true satisfaction in life.

Harris then introduces various techniques for handling difficult thoughts and feelings, such as "dropping anchor" and how to turn "the struggle switch" off. Every chapter introduces a technique, why it works, and references client stories to show how these techniques can help people. There are Troubleshooting sections at the end of a chapter, which answer frequent questions and reassure the reader that they are on the right path.

Towards the end of the book, Harris broadens the scope and discusses how to make life more meaningful by discovering one's values and using them as a guide, if not a fixed rule. He introduces the values square and discusses how visualising four main domains of life - work, love, health, play - can help structure and make the process of improving one's life less overwhelming. He discusses barriers that might crop up and that change can feel uncomfortable:

“Personal growth and meaningful change necessitates leaving your comfort zone. This inevitably brings up discomfort in the form of difficult thoughts, sensations, emotions, memories and urges. If we aren’t willing to open up and make room for these experiences, then we won’t do the challenging things that matter to us."

He provides further techniques for how to break down the process into short, medium and long-term goals, deal with the negative feelings that come hand-in-hand with change, and stay committed to the journey even when suffering setbacks or losing consistency:

"We acknowledge the painful reality we are dealing with, make room for all those painful thoughts and feelings, and treat ourselves kindly. Then we get in touch with our values and choose what we will stand for in the face of this. In other words: be present, open up and do what matters. The greater our ability to do this, the more freedom we have — no matter what obstacles life puts in our path"

== Publication History ==
The Happiness Trap was published on 1 March 2007 in Australia and New Zealand. It was released in the US by Shambhala Publications on 3 June 2008, and continued to spread around the world with publications in UK, Latin America, India, Germany, Korea, France, Sweden and China.

The book has sold over 1 million copies worldwide and has been translated into over 30 languages, among them Chinese, German, French and Spanish.

Russ Harris went on to publish several more books about acceptance and commitment therapy, including The Happiness Trap Pocketbook, The Happiness Trap Cards, ACT Made Simple, ACT with Love, The Confidence Gap and The Reality Slap.

A second edition was released in 2021, featuring over 50% new material with additional exercises, expanded sections on different emotions, perfectionism and a lot of new material on self-compassion.

== Reception ==
The book was well-received upon its release, with many praising the accessible writing style and way it introduces ACT: "ACT is not a form of meditation or a path to enlightenment—to reap the benefits, action is imperative. More of an ACT primer than anything else, there’s enough interesting content here to keep the reader, um, happy". A review in The Scavenger described it as "easy-to-read, practical and empowering".

Michael L. H. Collins wrote for The British Journal of Psychology:

"Harris certainly has broken the mold of the self-help book with this enthusiastic and unique approach to making the most of our lives ... a book like this, with its fresh, innovative and interactive style, might prove to be ‘just what the doctor (Harris) ordered’."

The Happiness Trap brought ACT to the mainstream, raising it from fringe psychological field of study to easily understood self-help aid. Oliver Burkeman wrote for The Guardian:

"Meditation teaches a similar lesson, as does the still youthful field of "acceptance and commitment therapy", outlined in Russ Harris's excellent book The Happiness Trap. The point isn't to improve your thoughts and feelings, or stamp out negative ones, so much as to "unhook" from them; to stop being a puppet they jerk around."

Body+Soul listed it on their Top Self-Help Books in 2010, alongside Eat, Pray, Love by Elizabeth Gilbert and The Seven Spiritual Laws of Success by Deepak Chopra..
