= The Easy Way to Stop Smoking =

Self-help book by Allen Carr

- 1987 Penguin edition
- Author: Allen Carr
- Subject: Smoking
- Pages: 239
- ISBN: 9780615482156

The Easy Way to Stop Smoking is a self-help book written by British author and accountant Allen Carr first published in 1985. The book aims to help people quit smoking, offering a range of different methods. Championed by many celebrities, there have now been several clinical studies that confirm the effectiveness of Carr's method including two randomised controlled trials. Allen Carr's Easyway to Stop Smoking in-person Live Group Seminars, on which the book is based, are now used by the National Health Service and Local Council Stop Smoking Services. A new upgraded version of the method is now available in book form under the title Allen Carr's Easyway to Quit Smoking along with Allen Carr's Easyway to Quit Vaping.

== Background ==
After 30 years of heavy smoking, Carr quit in 1983, at the age of 48. He subsequently left his job as an accountant in the same year and opened the first "easiest way" clinic, to help other addicts. Carr wrote a number of books intended to lead to smoking cessation and loss of excess weight, some of which were best sellers.

Carr writes that smoking addiction is innately psychological and therefore this is the most significant factor in addiction to cigarettes. The book is divided into 44 chapters, whose purpose is to lead the smoker to, upon completion of reading the book, make the decision to quit smoking.

== Clinical trials ==
A 2018 study funded by DOH Ireland set out with an objective to determine if Allen Carr's Easyway to Stop Smoking was superior to Quit.ie in a randomised clinical trial. Quit.ie is an online portal for smoking cessation. The Allen Carr method was implemented in group sessions. The trial consisted of 300 adults and concluded that Allen Carr's method was superior to Quit.ie. This was the first clinical trial of Carr's method. The research found "All AC quit rates were superior to Quit.ie, outcomes were comparable with established interventions." A larger 2020 study found 26 week abstinence rates of 19.4% (60 of 310) in the Allan Carr group and 14.8% (46 of 310) in the treatment as usual group, which provided behavioural and pharmacological support. However, this trend towards superiority of the Allen Carr method did not rise to statistical significance.

== Criticism ==
Pneumologist and tobacco addiction expert Bertrand Dautzenberg does not consider Allen Carr's Easyway to deal with evidence-based techniques. Dautzenberg's opinion is that while coaching methods are acceptable, Carr's book dismisses nicotine physical dependence and opposes substitution treatment; he concludes that doctors should advise against Allen Carr's Easyway method. Dautzenberg's own critics have noted that Dautzenberg's daily practice and interest is in the study of addiction and not in possible cures for addiction. Furthermore, two randomised controlled trials formed part of the evidence which led to approval for Allen Carr's Easyway to Stop Smoking in-person Live Group Seminars use on the National Health Service (NHS). Approval was granted by England's internationally renowned National Institute for Health and Care Excellence (NICE) with the committee finding that Allen Carr's Easyway was not only effective but also cost-effective. Allen Carr's Easyway is now used by NHS/Local Council Stop Smoking Services. Further studies continue to confirm the effectiveness of the method.

== Legacy ==
Ubisoft developed the Nintendo DS game My Health Coach: Easyway to Stop Smoking based on the book.
