= Wendy Kaminer =

American lawyer and writer

Wendy Kaminer (born December 28, 1949) is an American lawyer and writer. She has written several books on contemporary social issues, including A Fearful Freedom: Women's Flight From Equality, about the conflict between egalitarian and protectionist feminism; I'm Dysfunctional, You're Dysfunctional: The Recovery Movement and Other Self-Help Fashions, about the self-help movement; and Sleeping with Extra-Terrestrials: The Rise of Irrationalism and Perils of Piety.

== Early life ==
Kaminer graduated from Smith College in 1971. She earned her J.D. degree from Boston University Law School and practiced law as a staff attorney for the Legal Aid Society and in the office of the Mayor of New York City.

== Activism ==
=== Anti-pornography movement and anti-censorship movements ===
In the late 1970s, Kaminer worked with Women Against Pornography, where she advocated private consciousness-raising efforts and opposed legal efforts to censor pornography. She contributed a chapter to the anti-pornography anthology, Take Back the Night, wherein she defended First Amendment freedoms and argued the dangers of seeking legal solutions to the perceived problem of pornography. She opposed efforts by Catharine MacKinnon and Andrea Dworkin to define pornography as a civil rights violation. She critiqued the pro-censorship movement in a 1992 article in The Atlantic entitled "Feminists Against the First Amendment." An ardent free speech advocate, she is currently a member of the advisory board of the Foundation for Individual Rights and Expression.

Kaminer, a self-described equality or "individual rights feminist", was an early opponent of late 20th-century "protectionist" feminism, reflected in the movement to censor pornography, and of the "difference" feminism associated with Carol Gilligan. She critiqued "Feminism's Identity Crisis" in an October 1993 cover story for The Atlantic.

=== ACLU ===
Kaminer was a member of the board of the American Civil Liberties Union of Massachusetts from the early 1990s until June 2009. She was a national board member of the American Civil Liberties Union from 1999 until her term expired in June 2006. In 2003, during her tenure on the national board, she became a strong critic of the ACLU leadership and was centrally involved in a series of controversies, including the attempted ouster of the executive director, that culminated in a highly publicized effort to prohibit board members from criticizing the ACLU. In 2009 she published a book on her experience and views, called Worst Instincts: Cowardice, Conformity and the ACLU.

As of 2018, Kaminer still comments on the ACLU and what she believes is the appropriate relationship between protecting civil liberties and civil rights.

== Writings ==
Kaminer, a former Guggenheim fellow, has published seven books in addition to Worst Instincts, including her landmark 1992 critique of self-help and the recovery movement, I'm Dysfunctional, You're Dysfunctional: The Recovery Movement and Other Self-Help Fashions. She has also written extensively about irrationalism, spiritualism, and the intersection of religion and politics in America, the subject of her 1999 book, Sleeping with Extra-Terrestrials: The Rise of Irrationalism and Perils of Piety. Her feminist writings include her 1990 book, A Fearful Freedom: Women's Flight from Equality, reviewing the historic conflict between equality and protectionism for women and exploring the legal and social pitfalls of protectionism. A former legal aid attorney, she is a staunch critic of the death penalty and the criminal justice system, the subject of It's all the Rage: Crime and Culture. She is also the author of Free for All: Defending Liberty in America Today; True Love Waits: Essays and Criticism; and Women Volunteering: the Pleasure, Pain, & Politics of Unpaid Work from 1830 to the Present (1984).

== Personal life ==
On November 17, 2001 Kaminer married longtime companion Woody Kaplan. Kaplan, a former real estate developer, founded the Civil Liberties List (a political action committee) and was a full-time political and civil liberties activist. Kaplan was president of the Defending Dissent Foundation and chaired the advisory board of the Secular Coalition for America. Kaplan died on August 3, 2023 Kaminer is herself a member of the Secular Coalition advisory board. In 2001, Kaminer won the Humanist Pioneer Award from the American Humanist Association.
