= Cal Newport =

American computer scientist

- Born: June 23, 1982 (age 44)
- Education: Dartmouth College (BA); Massachusetts Institute of Technology (MS, PhD)
- Employer: Georgetown University
- Website: calnewport.com

Calvin C. Newport is an American nonfiction author and full-time professor of computer science at Georgetown University. He is known for his writings about attention management in the digital age.

== Background and education ==
Calvin Newport grew up in Pennington, New Jersey.

Calvin graduated from Hopewell Valley Central High School in 2000. He completed his undergraduate studies at Dartmouth College in 2004 and, in 2009, received a Ph.D. in computer science from the Massachusetts Institute of Technology under Nancy Lynch. He was a post-doctoral associate in the MIT computer science department from 2009 to 2011.

== Career ==
Newport joined Georgetown University as an assistant professor of computer science in 2011, was granted tenure in 2017, and was promoted to full professorship in 2024. His work focuses on distributed algorithms in challenging networking scenarios and incorporates the study of communications systems in nature. Newport is the author of eight books.

=== Attention management ===
Newport started the Study Hacks blog in 2007 where he writes about "how to perform productive, valuable and meaningful work in an increasingly distracted digital age".

Newport used the term deep work, previously used in a psychological or religious sense, in his book Deep Work: Rules for Focused Success in a Distracted World (2016). Newport uses it to refer to studying or working for focused chunks of time on intellectually skilful tasks without distractions such as email and social media. He challenges the belief that participation in social media is important for career capital.

In 2017, he began advocating for "digital minimalism." In 2021, he began referring to the role email and chat play in what he calls "the hyperactive hive mind".

In addition to his blog and newsletter, he is the creator of a regular podcast about productivity and knowledge working.

In 2019, Newport released his book Digital Minimalism: Choosing a Focused Life in a Noisy World. During a 2019 interview with GQ magazine, Newport suggested that our smartphones are like cigarettes and stated, "You're gonna look at allowing a 13-year-old to have a smartphone the same way that you would look at allowing your 13-year-old to smoke a cigarette."

== Books ==
- How to Win at College (Crown, 2005) ISBN 978-0767917872
- How to Become a Straight-A Student (Crown, 2006) ISBN 978-0767922715
- How to Be a High-School Superstar (Crown, 2010) ISBN 978-0767932585
- So Good They Can't Ignore You: Why Skills Trump Passion In The Quest For Work You Love (Grand Central Publishing, 2012) ISBN 978-1455509126
- Deep Work: Rules for Focused Success in a Distracted World (Grand Central Publishing, 2016) ISBN 978-1455586691
- Digital Minimalism: Choosing a Focused Life in a Noisy World (Portfolio, 2019) ISBN 978-0525536512
- The Time-Block Planner (2020)
  - 2nd ed. (Portfolio, 2023) ISBN 978-0593545393
- A World Without Email: Reimagining Work in an Age of Communication Overload (Portfolio, 2021) ISBN 978-0525536550
- Slow Productivity: The Lost Art of Accomplishment Without Burnout (Portfolio, 2024) ISBN 978-0593544853
