= The Subtle Art of Not Giving a Fuck =

2016 book by Mark Manson

The Subtle Art of Not Giving a Fuck: A Counterintuitive Approach to Living a Good Life
- Author: Mark Manson
- Language: English
- Publisher: HarperOne
- Publication date: September 13, 2016
- Publication place: United States
- Media type: Print
- Pages: 272
- ISBN: 978-0-06-245771-4 (hardcover)
- Followed by: Everything Is F*cked

The Subtle Art of Not Giving a Fuck: A Counterintuitive Approach to Living a Good Life is a 2016 nonfiction self-help book by American blogger and author Mark Manson. The book covers Manson's belief that life's struggles give it meaning and argues that typical self-help books offer meaningless positivity which is neither practical nor helpful. It was a New York Times and Globe and Mail bestseller.

== Publication history ==
The Subtle Art of Not Giving a Fuck was published under the imprint of HarperOne, a division of HarperCollins Publishers. It was released on September 13, 2016.

As of July 2024, over 20 million copies of the book had been sold.

== Contents ==
The book is a reaction to the self-help industry and what Manson saw as a culture of positivity that is not practical or helpful for most people. Manson uses many of his own personal experiences to illustrate how life's struggles often give it more meaning, which, he argues, is a better approach than constantly trying to be happy. Manson's approach and writing style have been described as different from other self-help books, using blunt honesty and profanity to illustrate his ideas.

The book has nine chapters. The first chapter, Don't Try, is named after the philosophy of Charles Bukowski, who served as a major inspiration for the whole book.

The chapters have the following titles:

1. Don't try.
2. Happiness is a problem.
3. You are not special.
4. The value of suffering.
5. You are always choosing.
6. You are wrong about everything (but so am I).
7. Failure is the way forward.
8. The importance of saying no.
9. And then you die.

== Summary ==
The Subtle Art of Not Giving a Fuck argues that individuals should seek to find meaning through what they find to be important and only engage in values that they can control. Values (such as popularity) that are not under a person's control are, according to the book, 'bad values'. Furthermore, individuals should strive to replace these uncontrollable values with things they have the capability to change, such as punctuality, honesty, or kindness. Manson further cautions against claiming certainty about knowledge that is out of one's grasp, especially in the case of attempting to leave a legacy. Meaning can be found, Manson claims, when one seeks to create joy in the moment for one's self and those around one, as opposed to being concerned with building a body of work as a legacy.

== Film adaptation ==
The Subtle Art of Not Giving a Fuck was released as a documentary film in 2023, with Mark Manson himself narrating the film. The film was directed by Nathan Price and produced by Tom Blackwell and Matthew Metcalfe. It was produced by GFC Films, Ingenious Media, and Trellick Films. Universal Pictures served as the distributor for the film.

== Reception ==
The Subtle Art of Not Giving a Fuck first appeared on the New York Times Bestseller List at #6 for the category of How-to and Miscellaneous for the week of October 2, 2016. It reached #1 for the first time on July 16, 2017. As of the mid of September 2024, the book has spent 327 weeks on the New York Times Bestseller list.

The book also appeared on the Washington Post Bestseller List at #9 in the Non-fiction/General category for the week of September 25, 2016, and on the Toronto Star List at #1 in the Self-Improvement category on September 23, 2016. In 2017, it was the best-selling nonfiction book from Barnes & Noble, the #4 best-selling book on all of Amazon.com, and the #9 best-selling book in Canada.

Kirkus Reviews said that the book was "[a] good yardstick by which self-improvement books should be measured".

Erica Rivera, writing for Mandatory, describes Manson's style in the book as being "as blunt as a man-to-man chat", and Katherine Pushkar describes it as "foul-mouthed, funny-as-hell, [and] dead-on", and his philosophy thus: "that life is hard, you're not special, happiness is a hollow goal and therefore you should make sure you're focused on the truly worthwhile", in her review in the New York Daily News.

The book was noted as a prominent instance of an industry wide trend of swear words in book titles during the 2010s.

Critics have been quick to note that the apparent lack of sophistication in language and style of the book is a clever disguise for more serious value-related content of the book.
