= Mark Manson =

American author and blogger

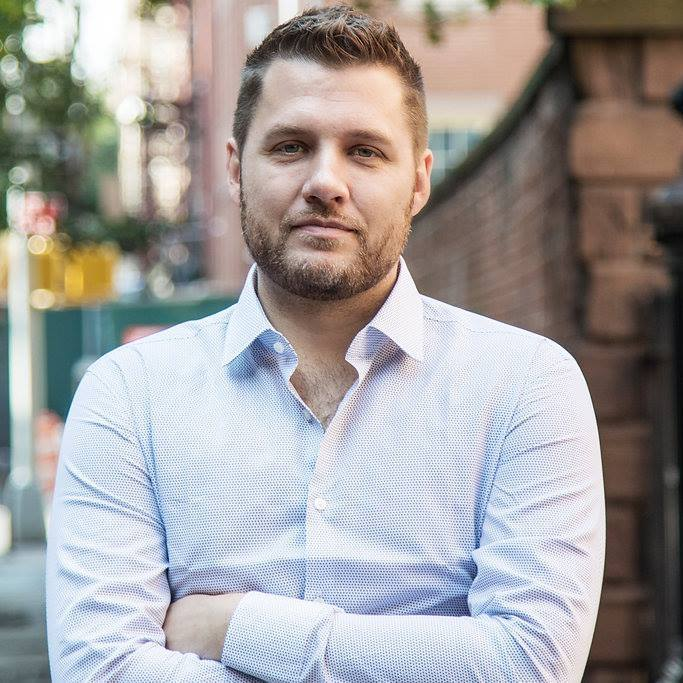
- Manson in 2018
- Born: March 9, 1984 (age 42)
- Education: Boston University
- Occupations: Author; blogger
- Notable work: The Subtle Art of Not Giving a Fuck (2016)
- Spouse: Fernanda Neute (m. 2016)
- Website: markmanson.net

Mark Manson (born March 9, 1984) is an American self-help author and blogger.

As of 2026, he has authored or co-authored four books, three of which, The Subtle Art of Not Giving a Fuck, Everything Is Fucked: A Book About Hope, and Will, were New York Times bestsellers.

== Personal life ==
Mark Manson was raised in Austin, Texas, in the United States, where he attended St. Andrews Episcopal School after his parents got a divorce. He moved to Boston, Massachusetts, to study international relations, and graduated from Boston University in 2007.

== Career ==
Inspired by Neil Strauss’s 2005 book The Game: Penetrating the Secret Society of Pickup Artists, Manson began posting on pickup artist forums. After gaining some popularity there, he began his first blog, Practical Pickup, in 2008, offering dating advice and coaching.

In 2010, he started a new blog called post masculine (now defunct) which provided general life advice for men. Manson's first book, Models: Attract Women Through Honesty, was self-published in 2011.

Manson moved his blog to markmanson.net in 2013.

In 2015, Manson published a blog article, "The Subtle Art of Not Giving a Fuck", which would form the basis of a book by the same name.

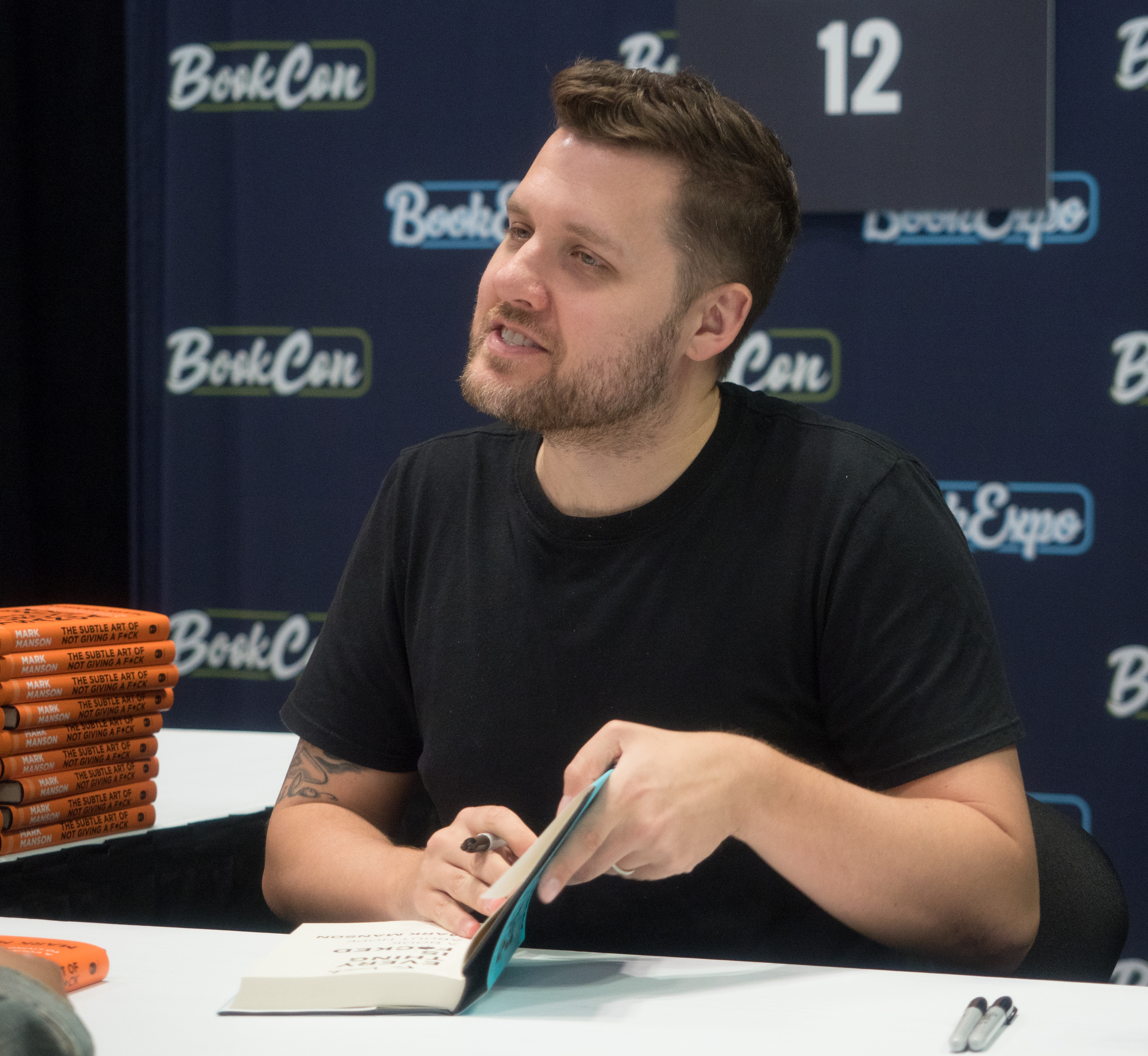
Manson signing his book Everything Is F*cked at BookCon 2019

His second book, The Subtle Art of Not Giving a Fuck: A Counterintuitive Approach to Living a Good Life, was published in 2016. It appeared on the New York Times Bestseller List at number six in the category of How-to and Miscellaneous during the week of October 2, 2016, rising to number one in July 2017. As of September 2022, the book had spent 268 weeks in the top 10 before dropping out, having sold over 12 million copies by June 23.

Manson's third book, Everything Is Fucked: A Book About Hope, was published by HarperCollins in 2019. It debuted at number one on the New York Times Bestseller List for Advice, How-to, and Miscellaneous.

In December 2020, Manson published an audiobook titled Love Is Not Enough, which was made available exclusively through Audible.

Manson worked with Will Smith to write the actor's autobiography, titled Will, which was published in November 2021.
