= Self-help book =

Instructional book for solving personal problems

A self-help book is a book or text that is written with the primary intention to instruct its readers how to solve problems of a personal nature. They take their name from Self-Help, an 1859 best-selling book by Samuel Smiles, but are sometimes known and classified as "self-improvement" books. Self-help books moved from their position in a niche market to much wider adoption and use in the late twentieth century.

== Characteristics ==
Self-help books cover a diverse range of topics but often include concepts and theories in the realm of popular psychology. Some well-known examples in this genre include Atomic Habits by James Clear and Man's Search For Meaning by Viktor E Frankl. All self books intend to assist the reader. The book 50 Self-Help Classics by Tom Butler-Bowdon is a survey of the self-help literature from Samuel Smiles to Brene Brown. Many celebrities have also marketed self-help books including Jennifer Love Hewitt, Oprah Winfrey, Elizabeth Taylor, Charlie Fitzmaurice, Tony Robbins, Wayne Dyer, Deepak Chopra and Cher. Like most books, self-help books can be purchased both offline and online; 'between 1972 and 2000, the numbers of self-help books...increased from 1.1 percent to 2.4 percent of the total number of books in print'.

== Early history ==
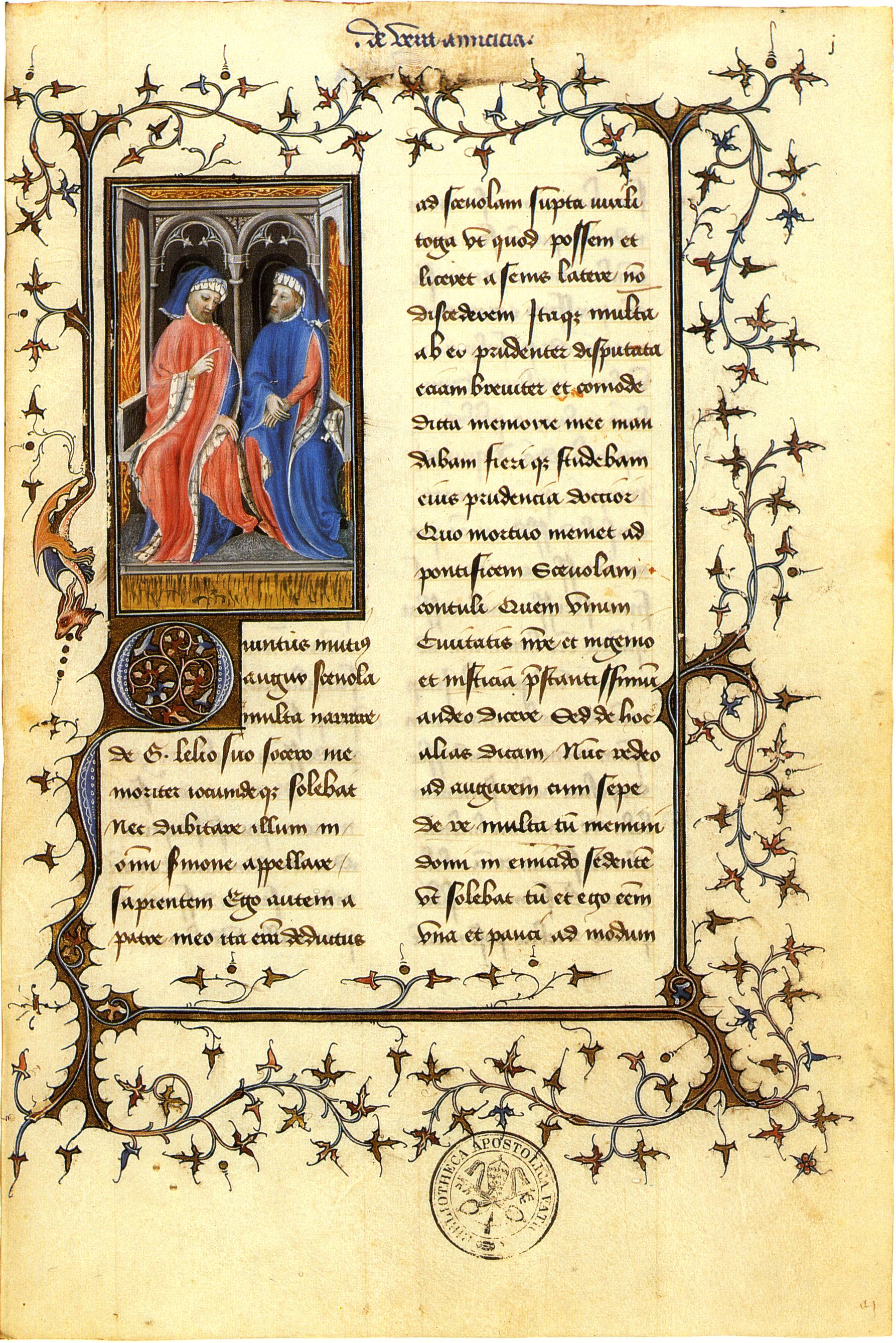
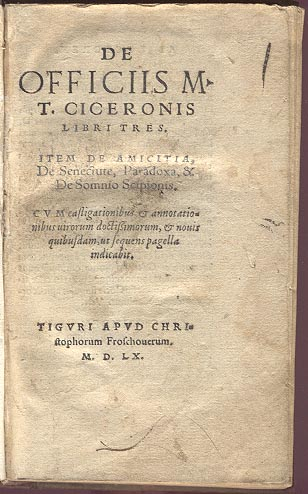
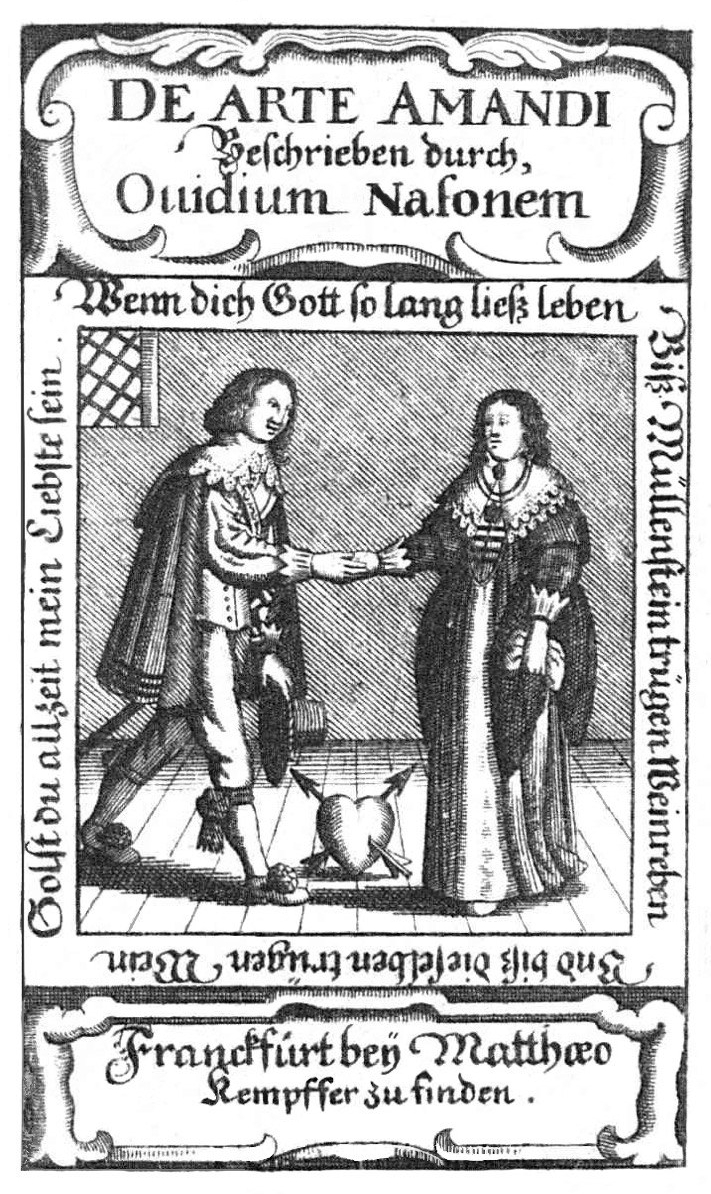
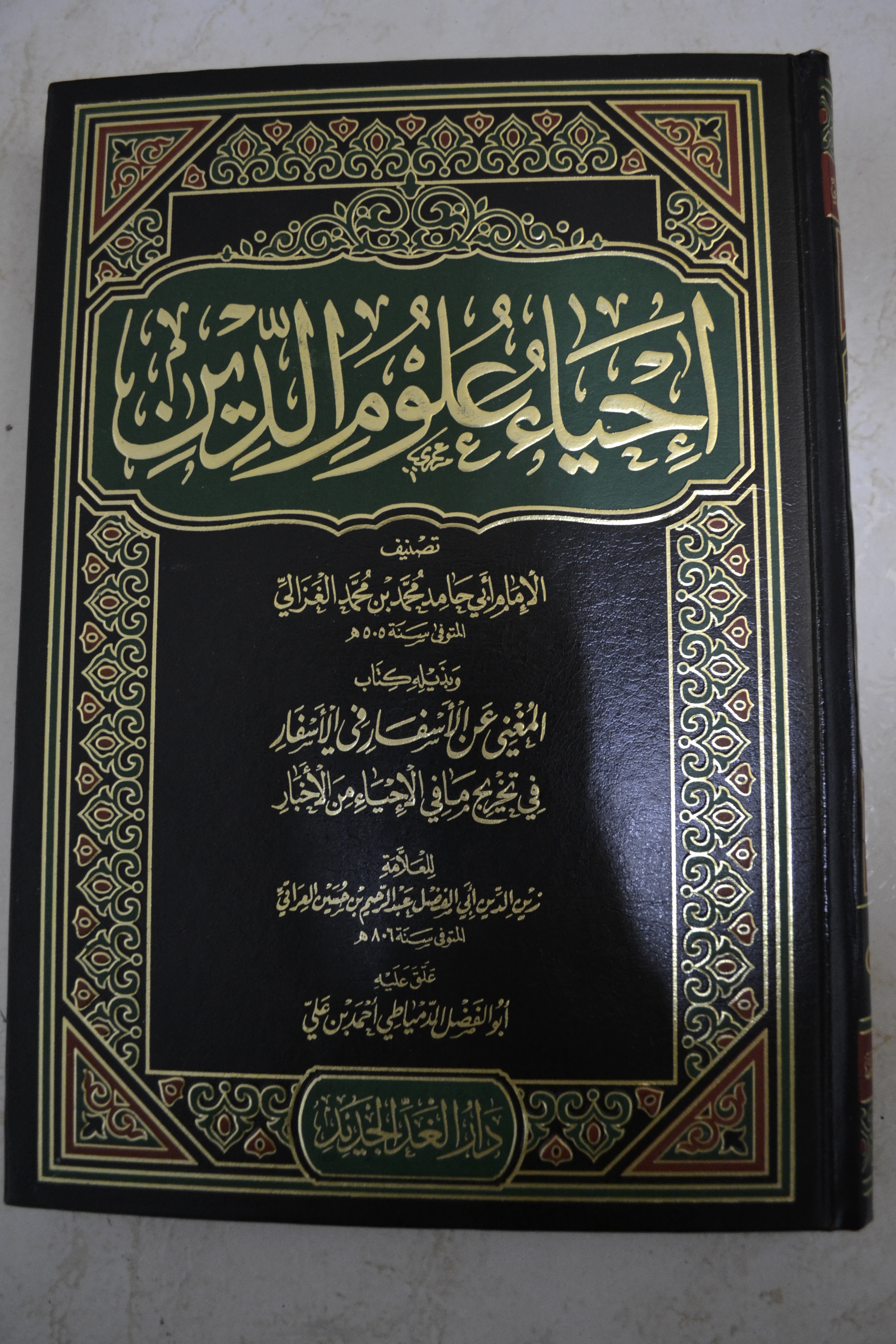
Several examples of Roman-era and Medieval guides to life and living.

Informal and formal guides to everyday behaviour have existed since the Bronze Age, if not before. Ancient Egyptian "Codes" of conduct "have a curiously modern note: 'You trail from street to street, smelling of beer...like a broken rudder, good for nothing....you have been found performing acrobatics on a wall!'". Micki McGee writes: "Some social observers have suggested that the Bible is perhaps the first and most significant of self-help books".

In classical Rome, Cicero's On Friendship and On Duties became "handbooks and guides" for Roman readers, and Ovid wrote both the Art of Love and Remedy of Love. The former has been described as dealing "with practical problems of everyday life: where to go to meet girls, how to start a conversation with them, how to keep them interested, and...how to be sociable rather than athletic in bed"; the latter has been described as containing "a series of instructions, as frank as they are ingenious and brilliantly expressed, on falling out of love".

Some scholars of the Islamic Golden Age also wrote books that could be categorized as self-help books. One prominent example is Al-Ghazali who wrote Ay farzand (O son!): a short book of counsel that al-Ghazali wrote for one of his students. Another is Disciplining the Soul, which is one of the key sections of The Revival of the Religious Sciences.

During the European Renaissance, a line of descent may be traced back from Smiles' Self-Help to "the Renaissance concern with self-fashioning" which "produced a flood of educational and self-help materials": The Florentine Giovanni della Casa in a 1558 book of manners published suggests "It is also an unpleasant habit to lift another person's wine or his food to your nose and smell it". The Middle Ages saw the genre personified in "Conduir-amour" ("guide in love matters").

== Self-help books in the 20th century ==
In the United States, Dale Carnegie's 1936 book, How to Win Friends and Influence People, became one of the best-selling books of all time, and in the process shaped the self-help genre.

In the 1960s, self-help books achieved greater cultural prominence, a fact admitted by both advocates and critics of the self-improvement trend. Some would 'view the buying of such books...as an exercise in self-education'. Others, more critical, still concede that 'it is too prevalent and powerful a phenomenon to overlook, despite belonging to "pop" culture'.

Where traditional psychology and psychotherapy texts tend to be written in an impersonal, objective mode, many self-help books 'involve a first-person involvement and often a conversion experience' with their prose. In a tone similar to the self-help support groups from which many examples draw, horizontal peer-support and validation are offered the reader through tone as well as substantive advice.

However, the movement from the self-help group to the individual reader causes most peer support to be lost, reflecting that 'over the course of the last three decades of the twentieth-century, there was a significant shift in the meaning of "self-help" to a largely individual undertaking'.

== Fictional analogues ==
Stephen Potter's "Upmanship" books are satirical takes on status-seeking under the cloak of sociability cast in advice-book form. It was later noted by Ringer that such advice would come to be being seriously advocated in the self-help world. In bestsellers like Swim with the Sharks, all 'kinds of seemingly benign guile are encouraged', on the principle that 'status displays matter: just don't be suckered by them yourself'.

A fictional example of the world of the self-help book is Bridget Jones. Taking 'self-help books...[as] a new form of religion' – 'a kind of secularised religion – a sort of moral values lite' – she attempts to integrate their conflicting instructions into a coherent whole. 'She must stop beating herself over the head with Women Who Love Too Much and instead think more towards Men Are from Mars, Women Are from Venus...see Richard's behaviour less as a sign that she is co-dependent and loving too much and more in the light of him being like a Martian rubber band'. Even she, however, occasionally questions whether they are helpful, wondering: 'Maybe it helps if you've never read a self-help book in your life'.

In the BookWorld Companion, it is suggested that 'those of you who have tired of the glitzy world of shopping and inappropriate boyfriends in Chicklit, a trip to Dubious Lifestyle Advice might be the next step. An hour in the hallowed halls of invented ills will leave you with at least ten problems you never knew you had, let alone existed'.

== See also ==
- Self-help
- Business fable
- Conduct book – A precursor to self-help books from the Middle Ages to the 18th Century
- New Thought
- Positive thinking
- Spirituality
  - New Age
