= 1902 in literature =

This article contains information about the literary events and publications of 1902.

== Events ==
- January 5
  - The political drama Danton's Death (Dantons Tod, completed and published in 1835) by Georg Büchner (died 1837), is first performed, at the Belle-Alliance-Theater in Berlin by the Vereins Neue Freie Volksbühne.
  - George Bernard Shaw's controversial 1893 play Mrs. Warren's Profession receives its first performance at a private London club.
- January 23 – The first example of a Sherlockian game – a study of inconsistencies of dates in Arthur Conan Doyle's The Hound of the Baskervilles (the serialisation of which in The Strand Magazine concludes in April) by publisher Frank Sidgwick – appears in The Cambridge Review.
- April – Mark Twain buys a home in Tarrytown, New York. On June 4 he receives an honorary doctorate of literature from the University of Missouri.
- June 16 – Bertrand Russell writes to Gottlob Frege about the mathematical problem to become known as Russell's paradox.
- July 1 – The Romanian language literary review Luceafărul begins publication in Budapest.
- August 6 – În sat sau la oraș (In the Village or in the City), by the Romanian peasant leader Constantin Dobrescu-Argeș, is performed in his native Mușătești, in front of an audience comprising Education Minister Spiru Haret and some 2,000 villagers.
- September 9 – P. G. Wodehouse leaves his job at the Hongkong and Shanghai Banking Company in London to become a freelance writer. On September 18, his first published novel, the St. Austin's school story The Pothunters, is published in London by A & C Black, as a truncation of the version in their Public School Magazine from January to March.

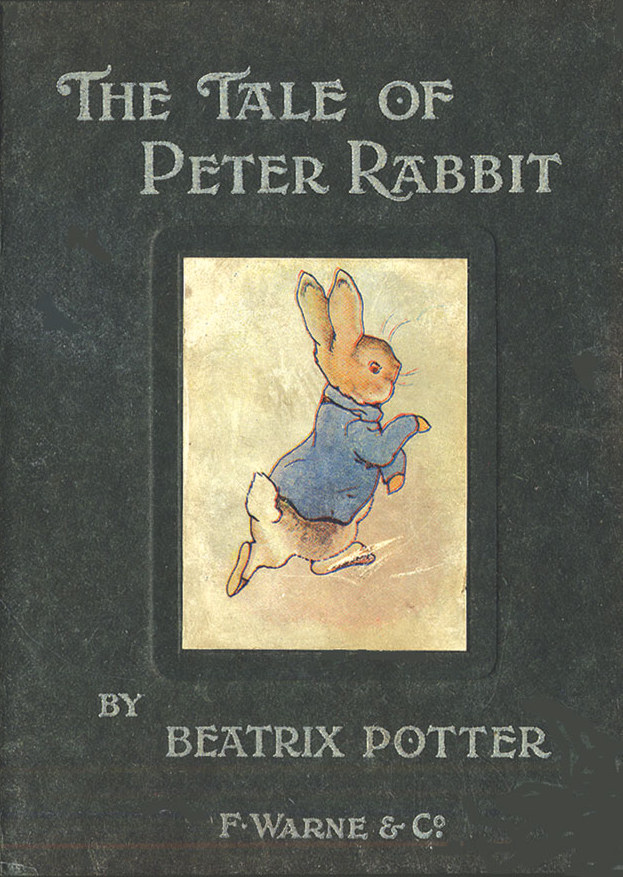
The cover of the first trade edition

- Early October – Beatrix Potter's self-illustrated children's book The Tale of Peter Rabbit (originally published privately a year earlier) appears in its first trade edition with Frederick Warne & Co in London. It sells 28,000 copies by the end of the year.
- October 5 – Thousands attend the funeral of the French novelist Émile Zola at the Cimetière de Montmartre, Paris. They include Alfred Dreyfus, given special permission by Mme Zola to attend.
- November 4 – J. M. Barrie's comedy The Admirable Crichton is first performed, at the Duke of York's Theatre in London, starring H. B. Irving, Henry Kemble and Irene Vanbrugh. It runs for 828 performances.
- December 5 – Leo Tolstoy's drama The Power of Darkness («Власть тьмы», Vlast' t'my, written in 1886) has its Russian-language première at the Moscow Art Theatre by Konstantin Stanislavski with some success, although Stanislavski is self-critical.
- December 18 – Maxim Gorky's drama The Lower Depths – Scenes from Russian Life («На дне», Na dne) is first performed, at the Moscow Art Theatre, as a first major success for Konstantin Stanislavski as director and star.
- unknown date – The poet Ștefan Petică's cycle Fecioara în alb is published, marking a maturing of Romanian Symbolism.

== New books ==
=== Fiction ===
- Azorín – La voluntad (Volition)
- Jane Barlow – The Founding of Fortunes
- Pío Baroja – Camino de perfección (pasión mística) (Road to Perfection)
- Edward Harold Begbie (as Caroline Lewis) – Clara in Blunderland
- Arnold Bennett
  - Anna of the Five Towns
  - The Grand Babylon Hotel
- Rhoda Broughton – Lavinia
- Joseph Conrad
  - Typhoon (serialized in The Pall Mall Magazine January–March and US book publication)
  - Youth: a Narrative, and Two Other Stories, incorporating Youth: a Narrative (1898) and Heart of Darkness (first 1899)
  - The End of the Tether
- Marie Corelli – Temporal Power: A Study in Supremacy
- Miguel de Unamuno – Amor y pedagogía
- Ramón del Valle-Inclán – Sonatas: Memorias del Marqués de Bradomín – Sonata de otoño (Sonatas: The Pleasant Memories of the Marquis of Bradomín – Autumn Sonata)
- Arthur Conan Doyle – The Hound of the Baskervilles
- Paul Laurence Dunbar – The Sport of the Gods
- Hamlin Garland – The Captain of the Gray-Horse Troop
- André Gide – L'immoraliste
- Ellen Glasgow – The Battle-Ground
- Annie French Hector – Kitty Costello
- Theodor Herzl – The Old New Land
- Violet Jacob – The Sheepstealers
- W. W. Jacobs – The Lady of the Barge (short stories, including "The Monkey's Paw")
- Henry James – The Wings of the Dove
- Alfred Jarry – Supermale (Le Surmâle: roman moderne)
- Mary Johnston – Audrey
- Olha Kobylianska – Zemlya (Land)
- Jack London – A Daughter of the Snows
- George Barr McCutcheon – Brewster's Millions
- Charles Major – Dorothy Vernon of Haddon Hall
- A. E. W. Mason – The Four Feathers
- W. Somerset Maugham – Mrs Craddock
- Dmitri Merejkowski – The Romance of Leonardo da Vinci
- Frank Norris – The Pit (serialization)
- Luigi Pirandello – Il Turno
- W. Heath Robinson – The Adventures of Uncle Lubin
- Saki – The Westminster Alice
- Percy Sykes – Ten Thousand Miles in Persia
- Jules Verne – The Kip Brothers (Les Frères Kip)
- Eduard Vilde – Mahtra sõda (The War at Mahtra)
- Owen Wister – The Virginian

=== Children and young people ===
- L. Frank Baum – The Life and Adventures of Santa Claus
- J. M. Barrie – The Little White Bird (includes the story "Peter Pan in Kensington Gardens")
- Edith Ogden Harrison – Prince Silverwings and other fairy tales
- William Dean Howells – The Flight of Pony Baker
- Rudyard Kipling – Just So Stories for Little Children
- Bessie Marchant – Fleckie: A Story of the Desert, etc.
- E. Nesbit – Five Children and It
- Beatrix Potter – The Tale of Peter Rabbit
- Edward Stratemeyer – The Young Volcano Explorers
- Mrs George de Horne Vaizey – A Houseful of Girls
- C. N. and A. M. Williamson – The Lightning Conductor: the Strange Adventures of a Motor-car

=== Drama ===
- J. M. Barrie – The Admirable Crichton
- Gaston Arman de Caillavet and Robert de Flers – Le Cœur a ses raisons
- Constantin Dobrescu-Argeș – În sat sau la oraș (In the Village or in the City, first performance)
- Clyde Fitch – The Girl with the Green Eyes
- Cosmo Gordon-Lennox – The Marriage of Kitty
- Maxim Gorky – The Lower Depths
- Haralamb Lecca – Septima. Câiniĭ
- Maurice Maeterlinck – Monna Vanna
- Frank Wedekind – King Nicolo
- W. B. Yeats – Cathleen Ní Houlihan

=== Poetry ===
- Edwin James Brady – The Earthen Floor
- Walter de la Mare (as Walter Ramal) – Songs of Childhood
- Ștefan Petică – Fecioara în alb

=== Non-fiction ===
- Jane Addams – Democracy and Social Ethics
- James Allen – As a Man Thinketh
- Hilaire Belloc – The Path to Rome
- Euclides da Cunha – Os Sertões (translated as Rebellion in the Backlands)
- Arthur Conan Doyle – The War in South Africa: Its Cause and Conduct
- Michael Fairless (pseudonym of Margaret Barber) – The Roadmender
- John A. Hobson – Imperialism: a study
- William James – The Varieties of Religious Experience
- Bertrand Russell – A Free Man's Worshipbeach
- William Wynn Westcott – Collectanea Hermetica (finishes publication)

== Births ==
- January 1 - Muhammad Zaki Abd al-Qadir, Egyptian journalist and writer (d. 1981)
- January 5 – Stella Gibbons, English novelist (died 1989)
- January 20 – Nazim Hikmet, Turkish lyricist and dramatist (died 1963)
- January 30 – Nikolaus Pevsner, German-born architectural historian (died 1983)
- February 13 – Fernando Chaves, Ecuadorian novelist, essayist, and journalist (died 1999)
- February 16 – Ion Călugăru, Romanian novelist, short story writer and journalist (died 1956)
- February 19 – Kay Boyle, American writer, educator and political activist (died 1992)
- February 27 – John Steinbeck, American novelist and journalist (died 1968)
- March 10 – Stefan Inglot, Polish historian (died 1994)
- March 29 – Marcel Aymé, French novelist and short-story writer (died 1967)
- April 2 – Jan Tschichold, German-born typographer (died 1974)
- April 6 – Julien Torma, French poet and dramatist (died 1933)
- April 9 – Lord David Cecil, English literary critic and biographer (died 1986)
- April 23 – Halldór Laxness, Icelandic novelist (died 1998)
- June 5 – Hugo Huppert, Austrian poet, writer and translator (died 1982)
- July 10 – Nicolás Guillén, Afro-Cuban poet (died 1989)
- July 8 – Gwendolyn B. Bennett, African American writer and artist (died 1981)
- August 15 – Katharine Brush, American short story writer (died 1952)
- August 16 – Georgette Heyer, English novelist (died 1974)
- August 19 – Ogden Nash, American poet and humorist (died 1971)
- August 24
  - Felipe Alfau, Spanish-American fiction writer, poet and translator (died 1999)
  - Fernand Braudel, French historian (died 1985)
- October 13 – Arna Bontemps, African American poet (died 1973)
- October 23 – Dadie Rylands (George Rylands), English Shakespeare scholar (died 1999)
- October 26 – Beryl Markham (Beryl Clutterbuck), English-born Kenyan adventurer and memoirist (died 1986)
- October 31 – Carlos Drummond de Andrade, Brazilian poet (died 1987)
- November 1 – Nordahl Grieg, Norwegian poet and author (killed in action 1943)
- November 2
  - Hu Feng (胡风), Chinese novelist (died 1985)
  - Gyula Illyés, Hungarian author (died 1983)
- November 29 – Carlo Levi, Italian writer (died 1975)
- December 20 – Jolán Földes, Hungarian novelist and playwright (died 1963)

== Deaths ==
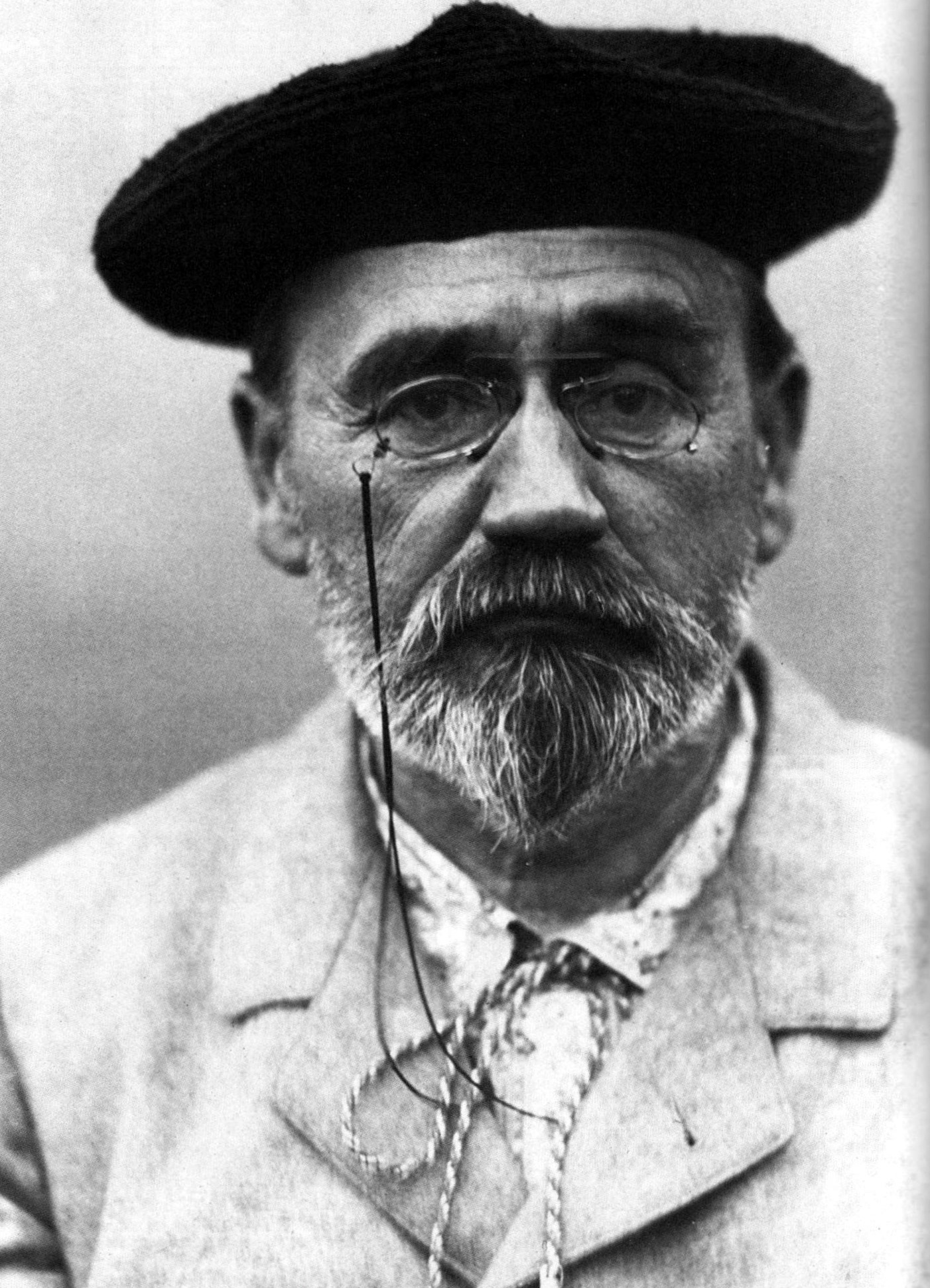
Émile Zola in 1902

- January 7 – Wilhelm Hertz, German poet and translator (born 1835)
- April 6 – Gleb Uspensky, Russian writer (born 1843)
- April 20 – Frank R. Stockton, American writer and humorist (born 1834)
- April 21 – Ethna Carbery, Irish poet (born 1866)
- May 5 – Bret Harte, American author and poet (born 1836)
- May 6 – Emma Augusta Sharkey, American dime novelist (born 1858)
- May 17/18 — Harriet Abbott Lincoln Coolidge, American philanthropist, author and reformer (b. 1849)
- June 10 – Jacint Verdaguer, Catalan poet (born 1845)
- June 18 – Samuel Butler, English novelist (born 1835)
- August 31 – Mathilde Wesendonck, German poet (born 1828)
- September 11 – Ernst Dümmler, German historian (born 1830)
- September 19 – Masaoka Shiki (正岡 子規), Japanese haiku poet (born 1867)
- September 29
  - William McGonagall, Scottish doggerel poet (born 1825)
  - Émile Zola, French novelist (carbon monoxide poisoning, born 1840)
- October 7 – George Rawlinson, English historian (born 1812)
- October 13 – John George Bourinot, Canadian historian (born 1836)
- October 25 – Frank Norris, American novelist (peritonitis, born 1870)
- October 31 – Cornélie Huygens, Dutch writer, social democrat and feminist (born 1848)
- November 16 – G. A. Henty, English historical novelist (born 1832)
- November 20 – George W. Ryer, American playwright and theatrical manager (born 1845)
- December 26 – Mary Hartwell Catherwood, American author and poet (born 1849)

== Awards ==
- Nobel Prize for Literature: Christian Matthias Theodor Mommsen
