= March 7 =

March 7 this year in various calendars
- Saturday, 7 March 2026
Akan	Nwonamemene
Armenian	20 Areg 1475
Aztec	Tecuilhuitontli 16, 5 Cuetzpalin
Babylonian	17 Shabatu, 2336 SE
Balinese pawukon	Menga, Beteng, Menala, Pon, Aryang, Saniscara of Ugu, Yama, Tulus, Manusa
Bengali	22 Falgun, BS 1432
Chinese	Yang Metal Dragon・Root Mansion; Fire Horse Year, Month 1, Day 19 (Jingzhe, 13 days until Chunfen)
Common Era	7 March 2026 CE
Coptic	28 Meshir, AM 1742
Egyptian	25 Epiphi, 2774 NE
Ethiopian	28 Yakātit, 2018 Amätä Məhrät
French Republican	Décade II, Septidi de Ventôse de l'Année 234 de la République
Gregorian	7 March, AD 2026
Hebrew	18 Adar, AM 5786
Hindu	Citrā・Vṛddhi; Solar: 23 Phālguna, 1947 SE; Lunisolar: Caturthī, Kṛishna pakṣa of Phālguna, 2082 VE; Rāudra・5126 KY・1,872,641
Icelandic	Laugardagur, 14 Góa 2025
Islamic	18 Ramadan, AH 1447 (using tabular method)
ISO week date	2026-W10-6
Japanese	19 Mutsuki, Reiwa 8 (Keichitsu, 13 days until Shunbun)
Julian	22 February, AD 2026 (AM 7534)
Julian day	2461107
Korean	19 Horangidal, 4359 DE
Maya	13.0.13.7.4; 2 Cumku, 5 Kan
Roman	ante diem VIII Kalendas Martias, MMDCCLXXIX AUC
Solar Hijri	16 Esfand, SH 1404
Tibetan	19 mchu, me pho rta 2153 or 1772 or 1000

<<	March					>>
Su	Mo	Tu	We	Th	Fr	Sa
1	2	3	4	5	6	7
8	9	10	11	12	13	14
15	16	17	18	19	20	21
22	23	24	25	26	27	28
29	30	31
2026

March 7 in recent years
2026 (Saturday)
2025 (Friday)
2024 (Thursday)
2023 (Tuesday)
2022 (Monday)
2021 (Sunday)
2020 (Saturday)
2019 (Thursday)
2018 (Wednesday)
2017 (Tuesday)

March 7 is the 66th day of the year (67th in leap years) in the Gregorian calendar; 299 days remain until the end of the year.

== Events ==
=== Pre-1600 ===
- 161 – Marcus Aurelius and L. Commodus (who changes his name to Lucius Verus) become joint emperors of Rome on the death of Antoninus Pius.
- 681 – The Third Council of Constantinople deposes patriarch Macarius I of Antioch.
- 1138 – Konrad III von Hohenstaufen is elected king of Germany at Coblenz in the presence of the papal legate Theodwin.
- 1277 – The University of Paris issues the last in a series of condemnations of various philosophical and theological theses.
- 1573 – A peace treaty is signed between the Ottoman Empire and the Republic of Venice, ending the Ottoman–Venetian War and leaving Cyprus in Ottoman hands.

=== 1601–1900 ===
- 1799 – Napoleon Bonaparte captures Jaffa in Palestine and his troops proceed to kill more than 2,000 Albanian captives.
- 1814 – Emperor Napoleon I of France wins the Battle of Craonne.
- 1826 – Shrigley abduction: 15-year old Ellen Turner is abducted by Edward Gibbon Wakefield, a future figure in the establishment of colonies in South Australia and New Zealand.
- 1850 – Senator Daniel Webster gives his "Seventh of March" speech endorsing the Compromise of 1850 in order to prevent a possible civil war.
- 1876 – Alexander Graham Bell is granted a patent for an invention he calls the "telephone".

=== 1901–present ===
- 1902 – Second Boer War: Boers, led by Koos de la Rey, defeat the British at the Battle of Tweebosch.
- 1921 – The short-lived socialist Labin Republic is proclaimed.
- 1931 – The Parliament House of Finland is officially inaugurated in Helsinki, Finland.
- 1941 – World War II: Günther Prien and the crew of German submarine U-47, one of the most successful U-boats of World War II, disappear without a trace.
- 1945 – World War II: The American 9th Armored Division unexpectedly captures an intact bridge over the Rhine.
- 1951 – Northwest Orient Airlines Flight 307 crashes in Lynnhurst, Minneapolis, killing 15 people.
- 1951 – Korean War: Operation Ripper: United Nations troops led by General Matthew Ridgway begin an assault against Chinese forces.
- 1951 – Iranian prime minister Ali Razmara is assassinated by Khalil Tahmasebi, a member of the Islamic fundamentalist Fada'iyan-e Islam, outside a mosque in Tehran.
- 1965 – Bloody Sunday: A group of 600 civil rights marchers are brutally attacked by state and local police in Selma, Alabama.
- 1965 – Aeroflot Flight 542 crashes in the Yermakovsky District, killing all 31 aboard.
- 1971 – Sheikh Mujibur Rahman, political leader of then East Pakistan (present day-Bangladesh), delivers his historic 7th March speech in the Racecourse Field (Now Suhrawardy Udyan) in Dhaka.
- 1986 – Challenger Disaster: Divers from the USS Preserver locate the crew cabin of Challenger on the ocean floor.
- 1989 – Iran and the United Kingdom break diplomatic relations after a fight over Salman Rushdie and his controversial novel, The Satanic Verses.
- 2006 – The terrorist organisation Lashkar-e-Taiba coordinates a series of bombings in Varanasi, India.
- 2007 – Reform of the House of Lords: The British House of Commons votes to make the upper chamber, the House of Lords, 100% elected.
- 2007 – Garuda Indonesia Flight 200 crashes at Adisutjipto International Airport in the Special Region of Yogyakarta, Indonesia, killing 21 people.
- 2009 – Massereene Barracks shooting: The Real Irish Republican Army kills two British soldiers and injures two other soldiers and two civilians at Massereene Barracks, the first British military deaths in Northern Ireland since the end of The Troubles.
- 2021 – At least 108 die and 615 are injured in the 2021 Bata explosions in Bata, Equatorial Guinea.
- 2024 – Sweden officially joins NATO, becoming its 32nd member.
- 2024 – Hannah Gutierrez-Reed is found guilty of involuntary manslaughter in the death of Halyna Hutchins on the set of the movie Rust, the first time someone has been found guilty for causing a death on a movie set.

== Births ==
=== Pre-1600 ===
- 189 – Publius Septimius Geta, Roman emperor (died 211)
- 1556 – Guillaume du Vair, French lawyer and author (died 1621)

=== 1601–1900 ===
- 1671 – Rob Roy MacGregor, Scottish outlaw (died 1734)
- 1678 – Filippo Juvarra, Italian architect, designed the Basilica of Superga (died 1736)
- 1693 – Clement XIII, pope of the Catholic Church (died 1769)
- 1715 – Ewald Christian von Kleist, German soldier and poet (died 1759)
- 1730 – Louis Auguste Le Tonnelier de Breteuil, French soldier and politician (died 1807)
- 1765 – Nicéphore Niépce, French inventor, invented photography (died 1833)
- 1785 – Alessandro Manzoni, Italian author and poet (died 1873)
- 1792 – John Herschel, English mathematician and astronomer (died 1871)
- 1811 – Increase A. Lapham, American scientist (died 1875)
- 1837 – Henry Draper, American physician and astronomer (died 1882)
- 1839 – Ludwig Mond, German-born chemist and British industrialist who discovered the metal carbonyls (died 1909)
- 1841 – William Rockhill Nelson, American businessman and publisher, founded The Kansas City Star (died 1915)
- 1843 – Marriott Henry Brosius, American senator (died 1901)
- 1849 – Luther Burbank, American botanist (died 1926)
- 1850 – Champ Clark, American lawyer and politician, Speaker of the United States House of Representatives (died 1921)
- 1850 – Tomáš Garrigue Masaryk, Austrian-Czech politician, 1st President of Czechoslovakia (died 1937)
- 1857 – Julius Wagner-Jauregg, Austrian physician and academic, Nobel Prize laureate (died 1940)
- 1858 – Cecilie Thoresen Krog, Norwegian women's rights pioneer (died 1911)
- 1872 – Piet Mondrian, Dutch-American painter (died 1944)
- 1875 – Maurice Ravel, French pianist, composer, and conductor (died 1937)
- 1885 – Milton Avery, American painter (died 1965)
- 1885 – John Tovey, 1st Baron Tovey, English admiral (died 1971)
- 1886 – Virginia Pearson, American actress (died 1958)
- 1886 – G. I. Taylor, English mathematician and physicist (died 1975)
- 1886 – Wilson Dallam Wallis, American anthropologist (died 1970)
- 1888 – William L. Laurence, Lithuanian-American journalist (died 1977)
- 1895 – Dorothy de Rothschild, English philanthropist and activist (died 1988)

=== 1901–present ===
- 1902 – Heinz Rühmann, German actor (died 1994)
- 1903 – Maud Lewis, Canadian folk artist (died 1970)
- 1904 – Ivar Ballangrud, Norwegian speed skater (died 1969)
- 1904 – Reinhard Heydrich, German SS officer and a principle architect of the Holocaust (died 1942)
- 1904 – Kurt Weitzmann, German-American historian and author (died 1993)
- 1908 – Anna Magnani, Italian actress (died 1973)
- 1915 – Jacques Chaban-Delmas, French general and politician, Prime Minister of France (died 2000)
- 1917 – Janet Collins, American ballerina and choreographer (died 2003)
- 1917 – Betty Holberton, American engineer and programmer (died 2001)
- 1922 – Olga Ladyzhenskaya, Russian mathematician and academic (died 2004)
- 1922 – Peter Murphy, English footballer (died 1975)
- 1922 – Andy Phillip, American basketball player and coach (died 2001)
- 1925 – Richard Vernon, British actor (died 1997)
- 1927 – James Broderick, American actor and director (died 1982)
- 1929 – Dan Jacobson, South African-English author and critic (died 2014)
- 1930 – Antony Armstrong-Jones, 1st Earl of Snowdon, English photographer and politician (died 2017)
- 1930 – Robert Trotter, Scottish actor and photographer (died 2013)
- 1933 – Jackie Blanchflower, Northern Irish footballer and accountant (died 1998)
- 1933 – Ed Bouchee, American baseball player (died 2013)
- 1934 – Nari Contractor, Indian cricketer
- 1934 – Gray Morrow, American illustrator and comic book artist (died 2002)
- 1934 – Willard Scott, American television personality and actor (died 2021)
- 1936 – Georges Perec, French author (died 1982)
- 1938 – David Baltimore, American biologist and academic, Nobel Prize laureate (died 2025)
- 1938 – Janet Guthrie, American race car driver
- 1940 – Daniel J. Travanti, American actor
- 1942 – Michael Eisner, American businessman
- 1942 – Tammy Faye Messner, American evangelist, television personality, and talk show host (died 2007)
- 1943 – Billy MacMillan, Canadian ice hockey player and coach (died 2023)
- 1943 – Chris White, English singer-songwriter and bass player
- 1944 – Ranulph Fiennes, English soldier and explorer
- 1944 – Townes Van Zandt, American singer-songwriter and guitarist (died 1997)
- 1945 – Bob Herbert, American journalist
- 1945 – Arthur Lee, American singer-songwriter and musician (died 2006)
- 1945 – Elizabeth Moon, American author
- 1946 – Matthew Fisher, English musician, songwriter, and producer
- 1946 – John Heard, American actor and producer (died 2017)
- 1946 – Peter Wolf, American singer-songwriter and musician
- 1947 – Helen Eadie, Scottish politician (died 2013)
- 1950 – Billy Joe DuPree, American football player
- 1950 – Franco Harris, American football player and businessman (died 2022)
- 1950 – J. R. Richard, American baseball player and minister (died 2021)
- 1952 – William Boyd, British author and screenwriter
- 1952 – Ernie Isley, American guitarist and songwriter
- 1952 – Viv Richards, Antiguan cricketer
- 1952 – Lynn Swann, American football player, sportscaster, and politician
- 1954 – Eva Brunne, Swedish bishop
- 1956 – Bryan Cranston, American actor, director, and producer
- 1956 – Andrea Levy, English author (died 2019)
- 1957 – Robert Harris, English journalist and author
- 1957 – Mark Richards, Australian surfer
- 1958 – Rick Bass, American author and environmentalist
- 1958 – Rik Mayall, English comedian, actor, and screenwriter (died 2014)
- 1958 – Merv Neagle, Australian footballer and coach (died 2012)
- 1959 – Tom Lehman, American golfer
- 1959 – Donna Murphy, American actress and singer
- 1959 – Nick Searcy, American actor
- 1960 – Joe Carter, American baseball player
- 1960 – Ivan Lendl, Czech tennis player and coach
- 1960 – Jim Spivey, American runner and coach
- 1961 – Mary Beth Evans, American actress
- 1962 – Taylor Dayne, American singer-songwriter and actress
- 1963 – Mike Eagles, Canadian ice hockey player and coach
- 1963 – E. L. James, English author
- 1964 – Bret Easton Ellis, American author and screenwriter
- 1964 – Wanda Sykes, American comedian, actress, and screenwriter
- 1965 – Jesper Parnevik, Swedish golfer
- 1966 – Terry Carkner, Canadian ice hockey player and coach
- 1966 – Jeff Feagles, American football player
- 1967 – Zheng Haixia, Chinese basketball player and coach
- 1967 – Ruthie Henshall, English actress, singer, and dancer
- 1968 – Jeff Kent, American baseball player
- 1969 – Brian Jamieson
- 1970 – Rachel Weisz, English actress
- 1971 – Tal Banin, Israeli footballer and manager
- 1971 – Peter Sarsgaard, American actor
- 1971 – Matthew Vaughn, English director and producer
- 1972 – Craig Polla-Mounter, Australian rugby league player
- 1973 – Jason Bright, Australian race car driver
- 1973 – Jay Duplass, American actor, director, producer, and screenwriter
- 1973 – Sébastien Izambard, French tenor and producer
- 1974 – Jenna Fischer, American actress
- 1974 – Tobias Menzies, English actor
- 1974 – Facundo Sava, Argentine footballer and manager
- 1975 – Audrey Marie Anderson, American actress and model
- 1975 – T. J. Thyne, American actor
- 1977 – Paul Cattermole, English singer and actor (died 2023)
- 1977 – Ronan O'Gara, Irish rugby player and coach
- 1979 – Rodrigo Braña, Argentine footballer
- 1980 – Eric Godard, Canadian ice hockey player
- 1980 – Laura Prepon, American actress
- 1983 – Manucho, Angolan footballer
- 1984 – Steve Burtt Jr., American-Ukrainian basketball player
- 1984 – Mathieu Flamini, French footballer
- 1984 – Jacob Lillyman, Australian rugby league player
- 1984 – Brandon T. Jackson, American actor and comedian
- 1985 – Cameron Prosser, Australian swimmer
- 1986 – Ryan Ciminelli, American bowler
- 1987 – Niclas Bergfors, Swedish ice hockey player
- 1990 – Jeff Withey, American basketball player
- 1991 – Ian Clark, American basketball player
- 1992 – Bel Powley, English actress
- 1994 – Chase Kalisz, American swimmer
- 1994 – Jake Layman, American basketball player
- 1994 – Jordan Pickford, English footballer
- 1995 – Jerome Binnom-Williams, English footballer
- 1995 – Aboubakar Kamara, French footballer
- 1995 – Haley Lu Richardson, American actress
- 1996 – Liam Donnelly, Northern Irish footballer
- 1996 – Pablo López, Venezuelan baseball player
- 1997 – Taher Mohamed, Egyptian footballer
- 1997 – Dylan Strome, Canadian ice hockey player
- 1998 – Amanda Gorman, American poet and activist
- 1999 – Ronald Araújo, Uruguayan footballer
- 2000 – Rasmus Sandin, Swedish ice hockey player
- 2000 – Sebastian Schwaighofer, Austrian politician
- 2007 – Kiyan Anthony, American basketball player

== Deaths ==
=== Pre-1600 ===
- 161 – Antoninus Pius, Roman emperor (born 86)
- 413 – Heraclianus, Roman politician and failed usurper
- 851 – Nominoe, Duke of Brittany
- 1226 – William Longespée, 3rd Earl of Salisbury, English commander
- 1274 – Saint Thomas Aquinas, Italian priest and philosopher (born 1225)
- 1407 – Francesco I Gonzaga, ruler of Mantua
- 1578 – Margaret Douglas, English noblewoman, daughter of Margaret Tudor and Archibald Douglas, 6th Earl of Angus (born 1515)

=== 1601–1900 ===
- 1625 – Johann Bayer, German lawyer and cartographer (born 1572)
- 1724 – Pope Innocent XIII (born 1655)
- 1767 – Jean-Baptiste Le Moyne, Sieur de Bienville, Canadian politician, Colonial Governor of Louisiana (born 1680)
- 1778 – Charles De Geer, Swedish entomologist and archaeologist (born 1720)
- 1809 – Jean-Pierre Blanchard, French inventor, best known as a pioneer in balloon flight (born 1753)
- 1810 – Cuthbert Collingwood, 1st Baron Collingwood, English admiral (born 1748)
- 1838 – Robert Townsend, American spy (born 1753)
- 1897 – Harriet Ann Jacobs, African American Abolitionist and author (born 1813)

=== 1901–present ===
- 1913 – Pauline Johnson, Canadian poet and author (born 1861)
- 1920 – Jaan Poska, Estonian lawyer and politician, Estonian Minister of Foreign Affairs (born 1866)
- 1928 – Robert Abbe, American surgeon and radiologist (born 1851)
- 1931 – Akseli Gallen-Kallela, Finnish artist (born 1865)
- 1932 – Aristide Briand, French journalist and politician, Prime Minister of France, Nobel Prize laureate (born 1862)
- 1935 – Baby Doe Tabor, American pioneer (born 1854)
- 1949 – Bradbury Robinson, American football player, physician, and politician (born 1884)
- 1954 – Otto Diels, German chemist and academic, Nobel Prize laureate (born 1876)
- 1957 – Wyndham Lewis, English painter and critic (born 1882)
- 1967 – Alice B. Toklas, American writer (born 1877)
- 1971 – Richard Montague, American mathematician and philosopher (born 1930)
- 1971 – Stevie Smith, English poet and novelist (born 1902)
- 1973 – Lalo Ríos, Mexican actor (born 1927)
- 1975 – Mikhail Bakhtin, Russian philosopher and critic (born 1895)
- 1976 – Wright Patman, American politician (born 1893)
- 1981 – Muhammad Zaki Abd al-Qadir, Egyptian journalist and writer (born 1906)
- 1982 – Ida Barney, American astronomer (born 1886)
- 1983 – Igor Markevitch, Ukrainian conductor and composer (born 1912)
- 1986 – Jacob K. Javits, American colonel and politician, New York State Attorney General (born 1904)
- 1987 – Karl Leichter, Estonian musicologist and academic (born 1902)
- 1988 – Divine, American drag queen and film actor (born 1945)
- 1988 – Ülo Õun, Estonian sculptor (born 1940)
- 1991 – Cool Papa Bell, American baseball player (born 1903)
- 1993 – Tony Harris, South African cricketer (born 1916)
- 1993 – J. Merrill Knapp, American musicologist (born 1914)
- 1993 – Martti Larni, Finnish writer (born 1909)
- 1993 – Eleanor Sanger, American television producer (born 1929)
- 1993 – Josef Steindl, Austrian economist (born 1912)
- 1997 – Edward Mills Purcell, American physicist and academic, Nobel Prize laureate (born 1912)
- 1999 – Sidney Gottlieb, American chemist and theorist (born 1918)
- 1999 – Stanley Kubrick, American director, producer, and screenwriter (born 1928)
- 2000 – Pee Wee King, American singer-songwriter (born 1914)
- 2005 – John Box, English production designer and art director (born 1920)
- 2005 – Debra Hill, American screenwriter and producer (born 1950)
- 2006 – Gordon Parks, American photographer, director, and composer (born 1912)
- 2013 – Peter Banks, English guitarist and songwriter (born 1947)
- 2013 – Damiano Damiani, Italian director and screenwriter (born 1922)
- 2013 – Claude King, American singer-songwriter and guitarist (born 1923)
- 2014 – Ned O'Gorman, American poet and educator (born 1929)
- 2015 – G. Karthikeyan, Indian lawyer and politician (born 1949)
- 2015 – F. Ray Keyser, Jr., American lawyer and politician, Governor of Vermont (born 1927)
- 2015 – Yoshihiro Tatsumi, Japanese author and illustrator (born 1935)
- 2016 – Adrian Hardiman, Irish lawyer and judge (born 1951)
- 2016 – Leonard Berney, Bergen-Belsen concentration camp liberator (born 1920)
- 2017 – Lynne Stewart, American attorney and activist (born 1939)
- 2019 – Dick Beyer, American professional wrestler (born 1930)
- 2024 – Steve Lawrence, American actor and singer (born 1935)
- 2025 – D'Wayne Wiggins, American musical artist (born 1961)
- 2026 – Jamie Dunn, Australian actor, radio and television host (born 1950)

== Holidays and observances ==
- Christian feast day:
  - Blessed Leonid Feodorov (Russian Greek Catholic Church)
  - María Antonia de Paz y Figueroa
  - Perpetua and Felicity
  - Siméon-François Berneux (part of The Korean Martyrs)
  - Teresa Margaret of the Sacred Heart
  - March 7 (Eastern Orthodox liturgics)
- Maritime Day in Slovenia
