= 1825 in literature =

This article contains information about the literary events and publications of 1825.

== Events ==
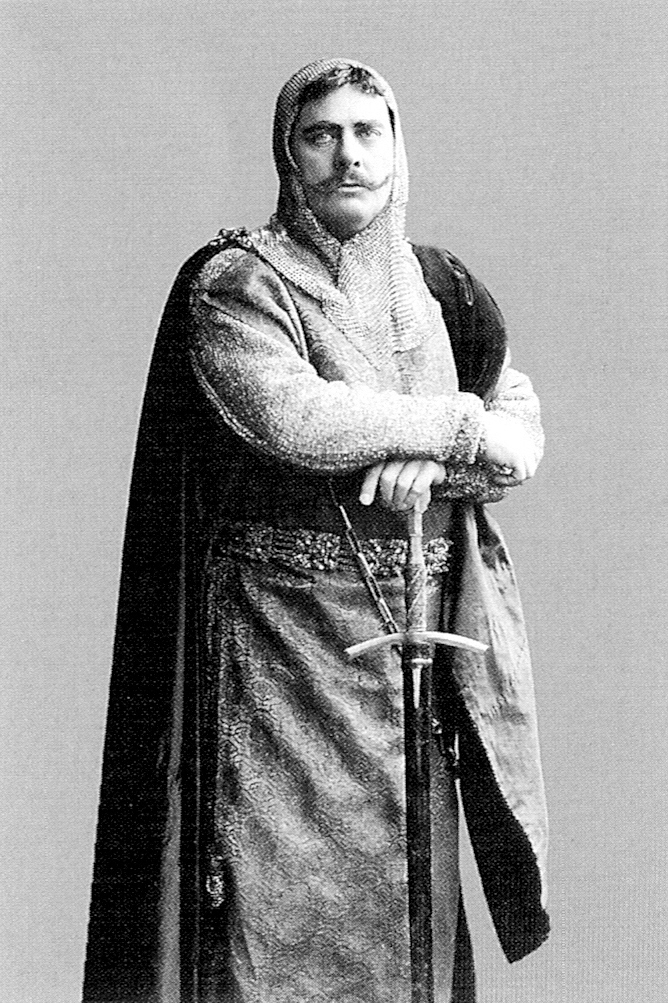
Max Devrient as Zawisch in König Ottokars Glück und Ende, performed in the Burgtheater in Vienna 1891.

- February 19 – Franz Grillparzer's König Ottokars Glück und Ende (The Fortune and Fall of King Ottokar, published 1823) is first performed, at the Burgtheater in Vienna, after Caroline Augusta, Empress of Austria, urges her husband Francis I of Austria to lift the censorship restrictions on it. The play is based on the historical events surrounding the life of Ottokar II of Bohemia, covering the fall of the king from the height of his powers to his death, when he had lost most of his supporters and lands, largely through his own actions. The context of the writing of the drama was very much shaped by Grillparzer's relationship with the Austrian state in which he lived. Inspired by the initial desire to write a tragedy about Napoleon, Grillparzer realised that the heavy-handed state censors of the Klemens von Metternich regime would never allow him to use such a sensitive subject. By choosing a figure from the 13th century, whose rise and fall in many ways echoed that of Napoleon, Grillparzer hoped he would avoid censorial intervention. In addition, partly out of a sense of genuine patriotism, but also partly to make the play yet more favourable to Austrian authorities, Grillparzer includes various pro-Habsburg elements in his drama. These include: the character of Rudolf I of Germany himself, founder of the Habsburg dynasty still ruling in the 19th century; the message that, under a just ruler, the disparate states of Austria-Hungary could successfully be part of a united empire (at a time when this empire was starting to creak at the joints); and not least in the monologue of Otto von Hornek in Act III, since known as the 'Praise of Austria' ('die Lobrede auf Österreich'), which has been taught in isolation to many generations of Austrian schoolchildren since.
- April – The antiquarian Charles Lamb retires from his clerical post with the East India Company in London on superannuation.
- May 6–June 15 – The two eldest Brontë sisters, Maria and Elizabeth, die at home at Haworth Parsonage aged 11 and 10, of tuberculosis (consumption) which they have contracted at Cowan Bridge School. The conditions at the school were harsh, with insanitary conditions, poor food and frequent disease outbreaks. The death of the eldest Brontë sisters followed an outbreak of typhus at the school in 1825. Their younger sister Charlotte later maintained that the conditions at the school had permanently affected her own health and physical development. She was of slight build and was less than 5 feet (1.5 m) tall, with very poor eyesight. After the deaths of Maria and Elizabeth, Patrick Brontë removed both Charlotte and Emily from the school and arranged for them to be homeschooled. Charlotte was greatly affected by the deaths of her older sisters, and later used Cowan Bridge as the model for Lowood School in her novel Jane Eyre (1847), a school which is similarly subject to outbreaks of tuberculosis and typhus exacerbated by the poor conditions. The headmaster of Cowan Bridge School, the Reverend William Carus Wilson, was represented by Charlotte in her portrait of Mr. Brocklehurst, the headmaster of Lowood, a depiction that later prompted Carus Wilson to threaten to sue Charlotte for libel.
- May 6 – French bibliophile, translator, lawyer and politician Henri Boulard (born 1754) dies, leaving a library of over half a million books, one of the greatest private book collections in history.
- December 17 – John Neal moves in with and becomes personal secretary of Jeremy Bentham, who recruits Neal to his utilitarian philosophy.
- unknown date – The first publication of Samuel Pepys' Diary (1660–1669) appears, edited by Lord Braybrooke from a transcription by Rev. John Smith.

== New books ==
=== Fiction ===
- John and Michael Banim – Tales of the O'Hara Family
- Lydia Maria Child – The Rebels
- Sarah Green – Parents and Wives
- Wilhelm Hauff – Der Mann im Mond (The Man in the Moon)
- Barbara Hofland – Moderation
- Charles Maturin – Leixlip Castle
- John Neal – Brother Jonathan: or, the New Englanders
- Lord Normanby – Matilda
- Alexander Pushkin - Eugene Onegin (serial publication begins)
- Sir Walter Scott (as "The author of Waverley") – Tales of the Crusaders:
  - The Betrothed
  - The Talisman
- Robert Plumer Ward – Tremaine

=== Children ===
- Maria Hack – English Stories. Third Series, Reformation under the Tudor Princes

=== Drama ===
- Caroline Boaden – Quite Correct
- Aleksander Griboyedov – Woe from Wit (part published)
- George Hyde – Love's Victory
- James Sheridan Knowles – William Tell
- Harriet Lee – The Three Strangers
- John Poole – Paul Pry
- Alexander Pushkin – Boris Godunov (published 1831, but approved for the stage only in 1866)
- William Tennant – John Balliol
- Charles Walker – The Fall of Algiers

=== Poetry ===
- Anna Laetitia Barbauld – Works
- Felicia Hemans – The Forest Sanctuary
- Esaias Tegnér – Frithiol's Saga

=== Non-fiction ===
- Jean Anthelme Brillat-Savarin – Physiologie du goût (The Physiology of Taste)
- Samuel Taylor Coleridge – Aids to Reflection
- George Gleig – The Subaltern
- William Hazlitt – The Spirit of the Age
- Sarah Kemble Knight – The Journal of Madam Knight
- John Claudius Loudon – The Encyclopaedia of Agriculture
- Thomas Moore – Memoirs of the Life of Richard Brinsley Sheridan
- Harriette Wilson – The Memoirs of Harriette Wilson, Written by Herself

== Births ==
- January 11 – Bayard Taylor, American poet (died 1878)
- February 13 – Julia C. R. Dorr, American author (died 1913)
- February 18 – Mór Jókai, Hungarian novelist and dramatist (died 1904)
- March 3 – Annie Keary, English novelist, poet and children's writer (died 1879)
- March 16 – Lucy Virginia French, American author (died 1881)
- April 3 – William Billington, English poet and publican (died 1884)
- April 13 – Minnie Mary Lee, American author of poems, stories, sketches and novels (died 1903)
- April 20 – Emma Jane Guyton (Worboise), English novelist and magazine editor (died 1887)
- April 24 – R. M. Ballantyne, Scottish writer of juvenile fiction (died 1894)
- May 21 – Nancy H. Adsit, American art writer, lecturer, educator (died 1902)
- June 7 – R. D. Blackmore, English novelist (died 1900)
- June 14 – Mary Elizabeth Beauchamp, English-born American author and educator (died 1903)
- July 2 – Richard Henry Stoddard, American critic and poet (died 1903)
- July 13 – Madeleine Vinton Dahlgren, American writer, translator, and anti-suffragist (died 1889)
- July 28 – E. J. Richmond, American author (died 1918)
- October 19 – Jeanette Granberg, Swedish playwright and translator (died 1857)
- October 23 – Walter Gregor, Scottish folklorist, linguist and pastor (died 1897)
- Uncertain date – Annie French Hector (pseudonym Mrs Alexander), Irish-born novelist (died 1902)

== Deaths ==
- March 9 – Anna Laetitia Barbauld, English poet, essayist and children's author (born 1743)
- April 23 – Maler Müller, German poet, dramatist and painter (born 1749)
- June 4 – Morris Birkbeck, American writer and social reformer (born 1764)
- June 11 – Helen Craik, Scottish novelist and poet (born c. 1751)
- August 10 – Joseph Harris (Gomer), Welsh poet and journalist (born 1773)
- November 7 – Charlotte Dacre, English poet and Gothic novelist (born c. 1772)
- November 25 – Desfontaines-Lavallée, French novelist and dramatist (born 1733)
- December 5 – Mary Whateley (Mary Darwall), English poet (born 1738)
- unknown dates
  - Huang Peilie (黄丕烈), Chinese bibliophile (born 1763)
  - Shen Fu (沈復), Chinese novelist and chronicler (born 1763)

== Awards ==
- Chancellor's Gold Medal – Edward Bulwer-Lytton
- Newdigate Prize – Richard Clarke Sewell, "The Temple of Vesta"

== Sources ==
- Barker, Juliet R. V. (1995). The Brontës. London: Phoenix House. ISBN 1-85799-069-2.
- Barker, Juliet (2010). The Brontes. Abacus. ISBN 978-0748122189.
- Smith Kenyon, Karen (April 2002). The Brontë Family: Passionate Literary Geniuses. Lerner Publications. ISBN 0-8225-0071-X.
