= The Way of Peace =

Book by James Allen

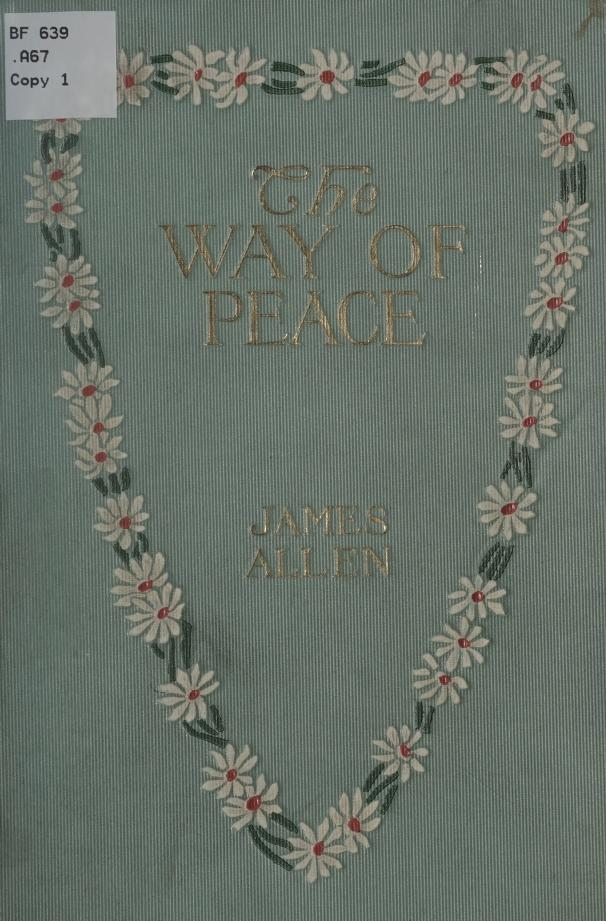
- Author: James Allen
- Language: English
- Subject: New Thought
- Genre: Philosophy
- Publication date: 1907
- Publication place: United Kingdom

The Way of Peace is a New Thought book written by James Allen. Although Allen is more widely known for his As a Man Thinketh, it is the lesser known The Way of Peace (1907) which reflects more accurately his New Thought Movement affiliations, referencing as it does Christianity, Buddhism and Hinduism.

The book is essentially a treatise on the importance of meditation as a 'pathway to divinity'. Whatever we meditate upon, Allen explains, we become. If you meditate upon ' that which is selfish and debasing, you will ultimately become selfish and debased'. Whereas if you meditate upon ' that which is pure and unselfish you will surely become pure and unselfish'.

It is now in the public domain within the United States and most other countries. It has been released as a Project Gutenberg eText edition.

The book consists of seven chapters: The Power Of Meditation; The Two Masters, Self And Truth; The Acquirement of Spiritual Power; The Realisation of Selfless Love; Entering into the Infinite; Saints, Sages, And Saviors, The Law Of Service; and The Realisation of Perfect Peace. The first chapter also contains a poem, Star of Wisdom, which captures the essence of the book.
