= City of Glasgow Bank =

Former British bank

The City of Glasgow Bank was a bank in Scotland that was largely known for its spectacular collapse in October 1878, which ruined all but 254 of its 1,200 shareholders since their liability was unlimited.

== History ==
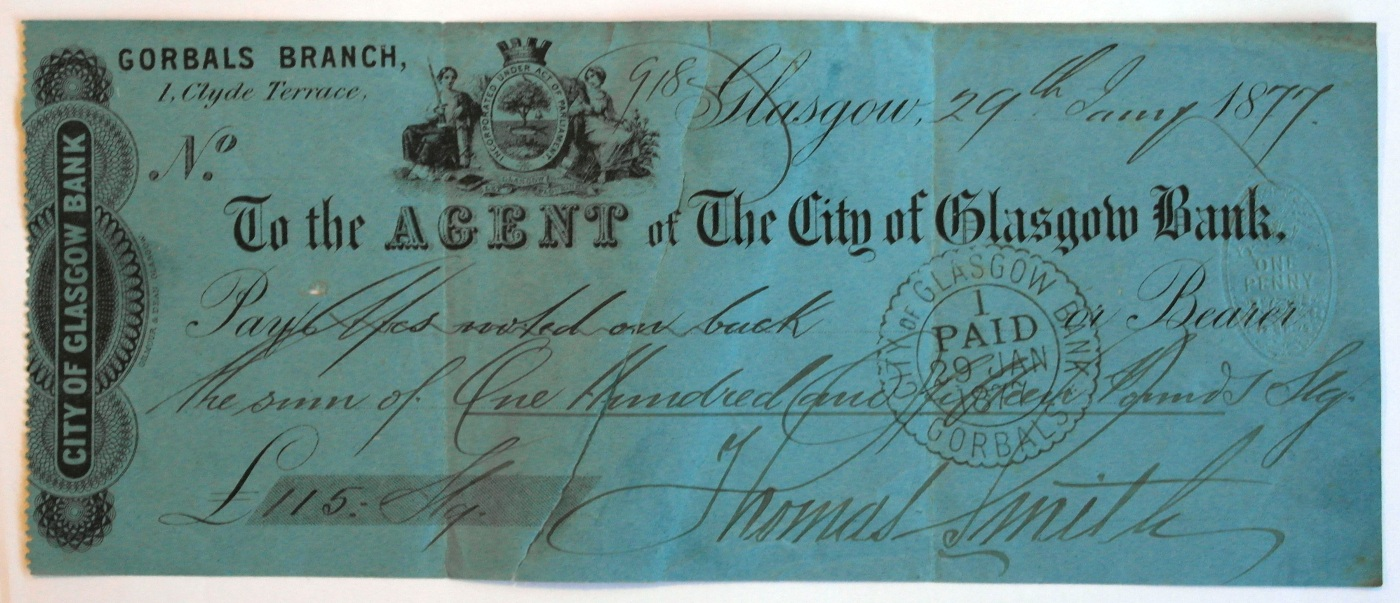
A cleared cheque from 1877

The bank was founded in 1839 with an initial capital of £656,250 (equivalent to about £56 million at 2023 prices). It aimed to cater particularly for small savers, with its branches opening in the evenings to receive deposits. It was part of a wave of bank formations that saw 16 Scottish banks established between 1825 and 1840. By the 1870s the bank had grown to have the third-largest branch network in the United Kingdom.

As was common at the time its shareholders had unlimited liability and so they were jointly liable to cover any debts and were called to inject additional funds to cover any losses.

The bank's principal office was established in Virginia Street, Glasgow in 1842 and moved to 21 Glassford Street in 1851. In 1855 it moved to a huge building on Trongate at the corner of Albion St. (Note: The Nelson St reference in Canmore is an error: should be Albion St) During the Panic of 1857, the bank had to suspend operation but later reopened and continued trading. For a long time before the bank's closure, dividends were paid at 9%-12%.

== Collapse ==
On discovery of a £7,000 deficit (equivalent to £½ million at 2005 prices), the bank's operations were suspended in November and December 1877, when by agreement with the other Scottish banks, the New York agency was closed. All seemed well, and in June 1878, the bank announced that there were now 133 branches and deposits of £8 million (equivalent to £820 million at 2025 prices), and it declared a 12% dividend.

On 2 October, however, the directors announced the bank's closure. An examination after the closure showed net liabilities of over £6 million (equivalent to £620 million at 2025 prices), together with extensive loans on poor security and speculative investments in Australasian farming, mining stocks and American railway shares. In addition, false reports of gold holdings were made to the authorities, financial statements were falsified and the share price was held up by secret share buybacks. So successful was the deception that on the bank's last business day, its £100 shares were selling at £236.

The directors were arrested and tried at the High Court in Edinburgh in January 1879. Their sentence was pronounced on 1 February. The manager, Robert Stronach and Lewis Potter, who had been a director of the bank since its establishment, were found guilty of falsifying and fabricating the balance sheets of the bank and were given eighteen months imprisonment each. The other five directors were found guilty of uttering and publishing the balance sheets, knowing them to be false, and were sentenced to eight months imprisonment.

Scores of Glasgow businesses failed as a result of the bankruptcy, and shareholders were called to make good the bank's losses. The case of one shareholder who sought to mitigate the consequence by arguing that he had become a shareholder through the fraud of the bank's agents was appealed unsuccessfully to the House of Lords ("Houldsworth's case", 1880, 7 R. (H.L.) 53).

Depositors and note holders did not suffer, as other banks accepted their notes, and deposits were protected by the shareholders' liability.

The 1,200 shareholders and their families suffered greatly. Their liability was unlimited, and the failure ruined most of them. A public subscription was set up to help the shareholders, almost all of whom were bankrupted by the disaster, in the form of a national relief fund, which received £379,670 in donations by 1882.

Wider effects of the collapse have been seen in the growth of limited liability and a temporary banking liquidity problem, and a longer-term reduced trend in bank deposits across the UK.

The legalities of the collapse and liquidation were overseen by Alexander Bennett McGrigor.

The liquidation of the U.S. assets, primarily holdings in railroad stock which amounted to $5,000,000, were handled by John Stewart Kennedy's firm J.S.Kennedy & Co.

== Archives ==
The bank's archives are now held in the Archives of the University of Glasgow.

== In literature ==
The Bank's collapse was vividly represented in the 1948 trilogy The Wax Fruit by Guy McCrone (dramatised by BBC Radio 4 in 2010). It also features in Mrs George de Horne Vaizey's 1910 novel A Question of Marriage.

The collapse is referenced in Ken Follett’s A Dangerous Fortune, pp 252, 270, 273, 274 and 436.
