= McGrigor =

McGrigor is a surname. Notable people with the surname include:

- Alexander Bennett McGrigor (1827–1891), Scottish lawyer, university administrator and bibliophile
- James McGrigor (1771–1858), Scottish physician
- Jamie McGrigor (1949–2025), Scottish politician
- Sir Rhoderick McGrigor (1893–1959), British Royal Navy admiral

== See also ==
- McGrigor Baronets
- McGrigors, a British law firm
