= Lily L. Allen =

Irish author (1867–1952)

- Born: Lily L. Oram; 30 December 1867; Newport, County Mayo, Ireland
- Died: 14 February 1952 (aged 84); Ilfracombe, England
- Occupation: Author
- Spouse: James Allen
- Children: Nora Allen

Lily L. Allen (30 December 1867 – 14 February 1952) was an Irish author.

== Early life ==
Lily L. Oram was born to John Oram and Jane (Talbott) Oram at Newport, County Mayo, Ireland on 30 December 1867.

== Career ==
In her twenties, Lily joined the Bible Christian Church and for a time was known as Sister Lily while working in impoverished areas of East London. She was a local preacher for the church and conducted missions over a wide area of the West Country. It was when conducting a mission in South Wales that she met her future husband and fellow writer James Allen, of Ilfracombe. They were married at Weston Bampfylde Church in May 1895.

Her daughter Nora Allen wrote of her: ¨She was a beautiful woman with large brown eyes, dark brown hair, which became white rather early in life, very good features and, to the last, an upright carriage. She had a striking personality and was in many ways an individualist. Her religious outlook was undoubtedly influenced by her husband, for after her marriage she inclined more towards the unorthodox. On account of this, she was "excommunicated" from the Bible Christian Church and returned to the Church of England, in which she had been brought up, though she did not continue as a practising member. She was a strict vegetarian. In home life, she was thoroughly domesticated, an excellent cook and enjoyed the running and work of the house. After her husband's death in 1912, Lily continued the publication of his magazine, "The Epoch", until failing sight forced her to give it up. She wrote several books, mainly on the lines of the power of thought and character building, but these never made the same impact on the public as those of James Allen.

Allen died in Ilfracombe, England on 14 February 1952, aged 84.
