= William Billington (poet) =

English poet

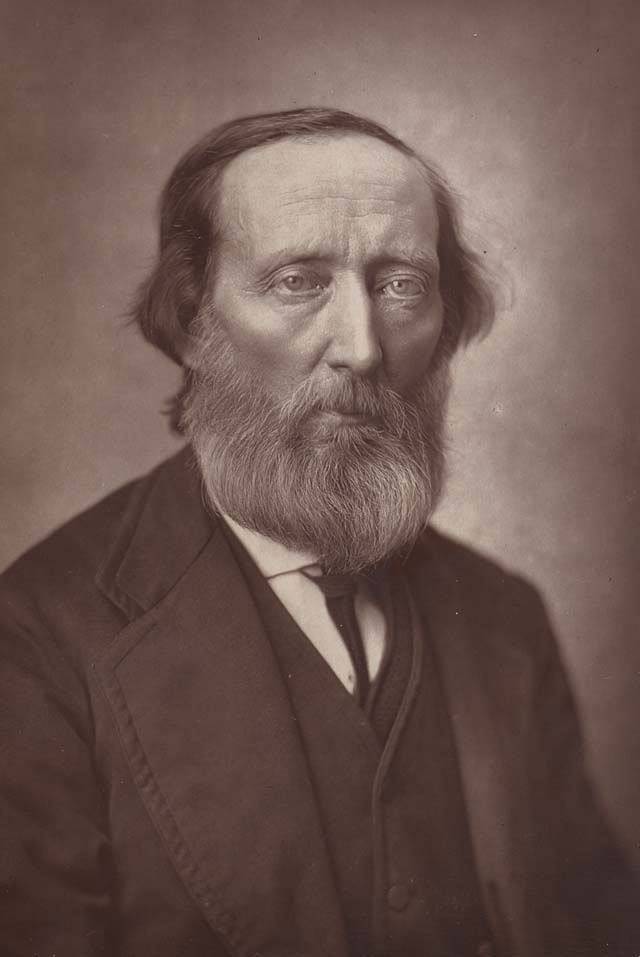
- Born: 3 April 1825
- Died: 3 January 1884 (aged 58)
- Spouses: Elizabeth Walmsley; Maria Fairbottom
- Children: 1

William Billington (3 April 1825 – 3 January 1884) was an English poet, living in Blackburn, Lancashire and sometimes writing in dialect. He became known as "The Blackburn Poet".

== Life ==
Billington was born in Samlesbury, Lancashire in 1825. His parents Benedict and Ann Billington were at the time unemployed hand-loom weavers, working for a contractor for roadmaking. His father died in 1832; three of his children died from tuberculosis before 1837. The surviving children were supported by Ann's hand-loom weaving.

He learned to read and write at Catholic Sunday schools; otherwise he was mainly self-taught. The songs composed by his uncle Robert Bolton, and the works of local poet Richard Dugdale, a lifelong friend, helped to give an interest in poetry.

In 1839 the family moved to Blackburn, and Billington passed through various stages of employment in the cotton mills, from "doffer" to weaver and "taper". On 24 June 1846 he married Elizabeth Walmsley; she died in 1857.

Billington wrote on many subjects in newspapers, broadsheets and pamphlets. He travelled in the north of England and to the midlands, reading and selling his poems. His knowledge of the way of thought and speech of Lancashire working people was turned to account in the period of the Lancashire Cotton Famine of 1861–65, when his rhymes were circulated in thousands of broadsheets. 14,000 copies of his broadsheet ballad "Th' Shurat Weyvur" were sold at that time.

On 13 July 1867 he married Maria Fairbottom. Contemptuous of his literary interests, Maria abandoned him and their young child. From 1875 he was a publican. He liked to debate religion and politics, and his beershop in Bradshaw Street, Blackburn, was a centre for his debating; known as "Poet's Corner", it was a meeting place of local poets including John Critchley Prince.

Billington died on 3 January 1884 at Bradshaw Street, Blackburn.

== Works ==
- A collection, Sheen and Shade, appeared in 1861. The poems are in standard English.
- Lancashire Songs, with other Poems and Sketches, including poems written in dialect, appeared in 1883.
