= Lucy Virginia French =

American poet

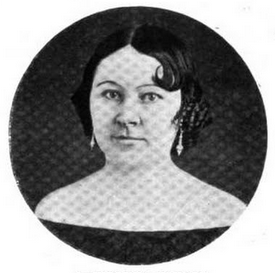
- Born: Lucy Virginia Smith; March 16, 1825; Accomack County, Virginia, U.S.
- Died: March 31, 1881 (aged 56) "Forest Home", near McMinnville, Tennessee, U.S.
- Occupations: Author; poet
- Spouse: John Hopkins French (m. 1853)
- Writing career
- Pen name: L'Inconnue (The Unknown)
- Language: English

Lucy Virginia French (née Smith; March 16, 1825 – March 31, 1881), known by her pen name L'Inconnue ("The Unknown"), was an American author and poet from Virginia. Her blank verse was considered especially strong, and her themes were well chosen, mostly in their measure. she belonged to a cultured and wealthy family. Educated at Washington, Pennsylvania, she moved to Memphis, Tennessee, where she lived until her marriage in 1853, to John Hopkins French, living after this at "Forest Home," near McMinnville, Tennessee. Her first volume of poems, "Wind Whispers," appeared in 1856. She wrote "Tecumseh's Foot," "The Great River," "The Lyre of Time," "The Palmetto and the Pine," "The Years," "Mammy," "Liberty Bells," and other poems, besides several novels and dramas. She took a keen interest in the political questions of the day and wrote about them. Her first novel, "My Roses," appeared in 1872, and her last one, "Darlingtonia," in 1879. Between the years 1856 and 1879, she was actively engaged as literary editor of a number of magazines and newspapers. She wrote under the name L'Inconnue (the unknown). Among her friends were James Russell Lowell, Henry Wadsworth Longfellow, Oliver Wendell Holmes Sr., John Greenleaf Whittier, and William Cullen Bryant.

== Early life and education ==
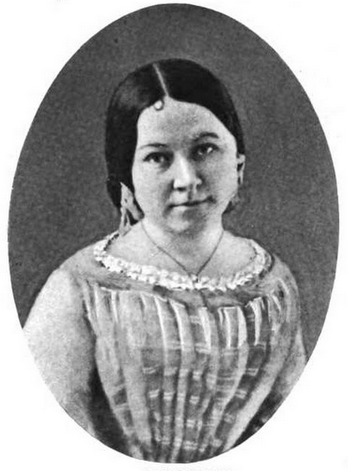
Lucy Virginia French

Lucy Virginia Smith was born March 16, 1825, in Accomack County, Virginia. Her parents were Mease W. Smith and Elizabeth Parker. She was named for the state where she was born. Her parents belonged to cultured and wealthy families. Her mother, also a Virginian, and a relative of Gov. Henry A. Wise, was Miss Elizabeth Parker. Her grandfather, Col. Thomas Parker, was a wealthy merchant in the East Indian and the South American trade but was better known as "Fighting Tom" Parker, having served as a cavalry officer of the American Revolutionary War. Her father, Mease W. Smith, was at one-time president of Washington College, Virginia (now Washington and Lee University). He had previously held the chair of Greek and Latin in that institution. He also filled the office of chancellor of Virginia and was prominent as an educator and as a lawyer.

By the early death of her mother, the child was left to the care of her grandparents. She and her younger sister were sent to Washington, Pennsylvania, for their education, and after their graduation from Mrs. Hannah's School, they returned to their father's home on the eastern shore of Virginia. But their father had married again, and a new influence had entered the old home. Virginia soon decided that she wanted to leave. It was not long afterward that she and her young sister Lide (later, Mrs. Meriwether) moved to Tennessee.

== Career ==
French and her sister became teachers in Memphis, in the 1840s. In 1849, under the name of L'Inconnuehe, French wrote for the Louisville Journal, of which George D. Prentice was editor, and many of her poems, songs, and legends first appeared in its columns. Her friends at that time were Lowell, Longfellow, Emerson, Holmes, Realf, Bryant, and Whittier. In 1852, she became the editor of Southern Ladies Book, continuing till the following year.

French was a versatile writer. Besides many poems, she was the author of several novels and dramas of literary merit. She also had an interest in the political questions of her day. During the American Civil War, she favored preserving the Union and pleaded earnestly for restoration. Throughout the remaining years of her life, she wrote, worked, and prayed for reconciliation. Though the North was the home of her early childhood, the South was her birthplace and her home in her mature years.

Two poems which illustrate French's freedom from political and sectional prejudice are "Shermanized," and "The Palmetto and the Pine." The first was written just after Sherman's march to the sea; the latter appeared in 1876, in the Saturday Evening Post, of which William Cullen Bryant was then editor, and was a direct rebuke to a memorable congressional speech of the Hon. James G. Blaine, whom she had known from her girlhood. "Shermanized" is well remembered throughout the South; "like the flash of the yataghan from a velvet sheath," was the comment of a noted writer, who admired the spirit of the poem and of the author. "The Palmetto and the Pine" was reproduced with illustrations in the July 1899 number of The American Illustrated Methodist Magazine, while another poem, "Mammy," a home picture of the South before the war, appeared in the February 1900 issue. "Liberty Bells," written in 1876, was characteristic of the spirit of unity which was the theme of many of French's later poems.

French's first volume of poems, "Wind Whispers," appeared in 1856, followed the same year by a tragedy in five acts, "Istalilxo, the Lady of Tula," the scene of which was laid in Mexico before its conquest by Cortez. Between the years 1856 and 1879, French was actively engaged as a literary editor of a number of magazines and newspapers. In 1872, her first novel, "My Roses," was published, and in 1879 her last novel, "Darlingtonia," appeared serially in the Detroit Free Press.

== Personal life ==
A poem entitled "The Lost Louisiana," which appeared in one of the New Orleans dailies, proved to be the precursor of French's marriage. John Hopkins French, standing in front of the St. Charles Hotel, New Orleans, was approached by a newsboy selling the morning papers: "All about the lost 'Louisiana'!" the boy shouted. Mr. French's interest was aroused by the words "lost Louisiana." Some years before, he had been a passenger on the steamboat, "Belle of Clarksville," and had nearly died in a collision between that steamer and the "Louisiana." Besides the detailed account of the accident, the paper contained the story of the accident in verse. The poem was signed "L'Inconnue." The beauty of the verses and the name "L'Inconnue," which was already well known throughout the South, added to Mr. French's personal interest in the theme, that he clipped the poem from the paper and placed it in his wallet. Not long after, Mr. French was a passenger on a steamer. A poem in a newspaper he found on board had a strange interest for him. It was entitled "One or Two?", and the author was L'Inconnue. "Sweet, simple and musical," he thought; so different from the majestic nature of "The Lost Louisiana," still in his wallet. On the impulse of the moment, he said to himself: "I will quit this boat at Memphis. I will see L'Inconnue, and I will ask her if we shall be "One or Two?" On the day after his arrival in Memphis, while making some purchases in a bookstore, a young woman entered and bought a magazine. Mr. French was attracted by her looks, and after she walked out, he asked the salesman for the name of the customer. "Miss Lucy Virginia Smith," the clerk replied. Mr. French was surprised as he had just seen L'Inconnue. They married on January 12, 1853, in the Episcopal Church. After an extended honeymoon, the pair returned to Tennessee, and resided at "Forest Home," near McMinnville, Tennessee, the homestead of the French family.

During the Civil War, Mrs. French kept a detailed diary of her daily life. A riveting story, it begins in February, 1862 and continues through the end of the war until June 26th, 1865. Mrs. French recounts in her diary the death of, "Honest Abe," and the reactions of the people in the community around her as well. It is 195 pages full of her real world experiences during the American Civil War, and illuminates how her thoughts evolved throughout the conflict.

Although her health had been frail for several months, her last illness was short. She died March 31, 1881, at "Forest Home", near McMinnville.

== Selected works ==
- 1856, Wind Whispers
- 1856, Istalilxo
- 1856, The Lady of Tula
- 1867, Legends of the South
- 1872, My Roses
- 1879, Darlingtonia
