= Alexander Bennett McGrigor =

Dr Alexander Bennett McGrigor of Cairnoch LLD (1827–1891) was a Scottish lawyer, university administrator and bibliophile. After his death he donated what is now known as the McGrigor Collection to Glasgow University Library.

== Life ==
He was born on 1 May 1827. He was the son of Alexander McGrigor, a lawyer, living at 3 Milton Place in Glasgow with offices on St. Vincent Street in the city centre. His mother was Janet Stevenson Bennett.

He studied law at Glasgow University, but it is unclear if he graduated. He nevertheless joined his father in the family law firm, which by 1845 had moved to 52 George Square. The firm merged to become McGrigor & Stevenson and later became McGrigor Murray & McGrigor, one of Glasgow’s largest law firms. Alexander became head of the firm in 1853. In 1855 he was living at 19 Woodside Terrace but also now owned the family estate of Cairnoch in Stirlingshire. In December 1859 he was commissioned as a captain in the Lanarkshire Rifle Volunteers.

In 1877 Glasgow University awarded him an honorary doctorate (LLD). In 1879 he was elected a Fellow of the Royal Society of Edinburgh. His proposers were William Thomson, Lord Kelvin, Sir James David Marwick, John Gray McKendrick, and John Hutton Balfour. He resigned from the Society in 1890.

In 1878 he had to report to shareholders in relation to the collapse of the City of Glasgow Bank and oversaw its liquidation. In 1888 he was Honorary Secretary of the Glasgow International Exhibition. He was involved in several transport projects, including the Union Railway, Glasgow Tramways and Vale of Clyde Tramway. He was President of the Clan Gregor Society. He was a supporter of women’s suffrage and attended a demonstration with his wife.

He died on 22 March 1891 at Cairnoch House in Stirlingshire.

== Family ==
In 1848 in Lanark he married Elizabeth Robertson. His son was also Alexander Bennet McGrigor.
