= Sebastian Schwaighofer =

Austrian politician (born 2000)

Member of the National Council
- Incumbent
- Assumed office 24 October 2024
- Constituency: Lungau-Pinzgau-Pongau

Personal details
- Born: 7 March 2000 (age 26)
- Party: Freedom Party

Sebastian Schwaighofer (born 7 March 2000) is an Austrian politician of the Freedom Party serving as a member of the National Council since 2024. Since 2023, he has served as executive chairman of the Freedom Party's youth wing Ring Freiheitlicher Jugend.
