= Fernando Chaves =

Ecuadorian novelist (1902–1999)

Fernando Chaves Reyes (February 13, 1902 – 1999) was a novelist, essayist, and journalist. He was the first Ecuadorian writer to depict an indigenous theme in his writings.

Chaves was Ecuador's ambassador to El Salvador, Ecuador and Nicaragua.

Chaves' novel Plata y bronce (Silver and Bronze) (1927) was the first indigenist novel in Ecuador. Chaves was influenced by the Bolivian novelist Alcides Arguedas, who in 1919 wrote the indigenist novel Raza de bronze (Race of Bronze). Chávez' novel influenced other future Chaves was born in Otavalo. He was married to Magdalena Marie Ribreau, who died of a stroke in 1982.

In 1991 he received the National Grand Cross of the Order of Merit.

Chaves died in 1999 in Quito.

== Works ==
Novels

- La embrujada (1923)
- Plata y bronce (1927)
- Escombros (Quito, 1958)

Non fiction

- Crónica de mi viaje a México (Quito, 1992)
- El hombre ecuatoriano y su cultura (Quito, 1990)
