= Slovenian Maritime Day =

Slovenian anniversary dedicated to maritime activities and history

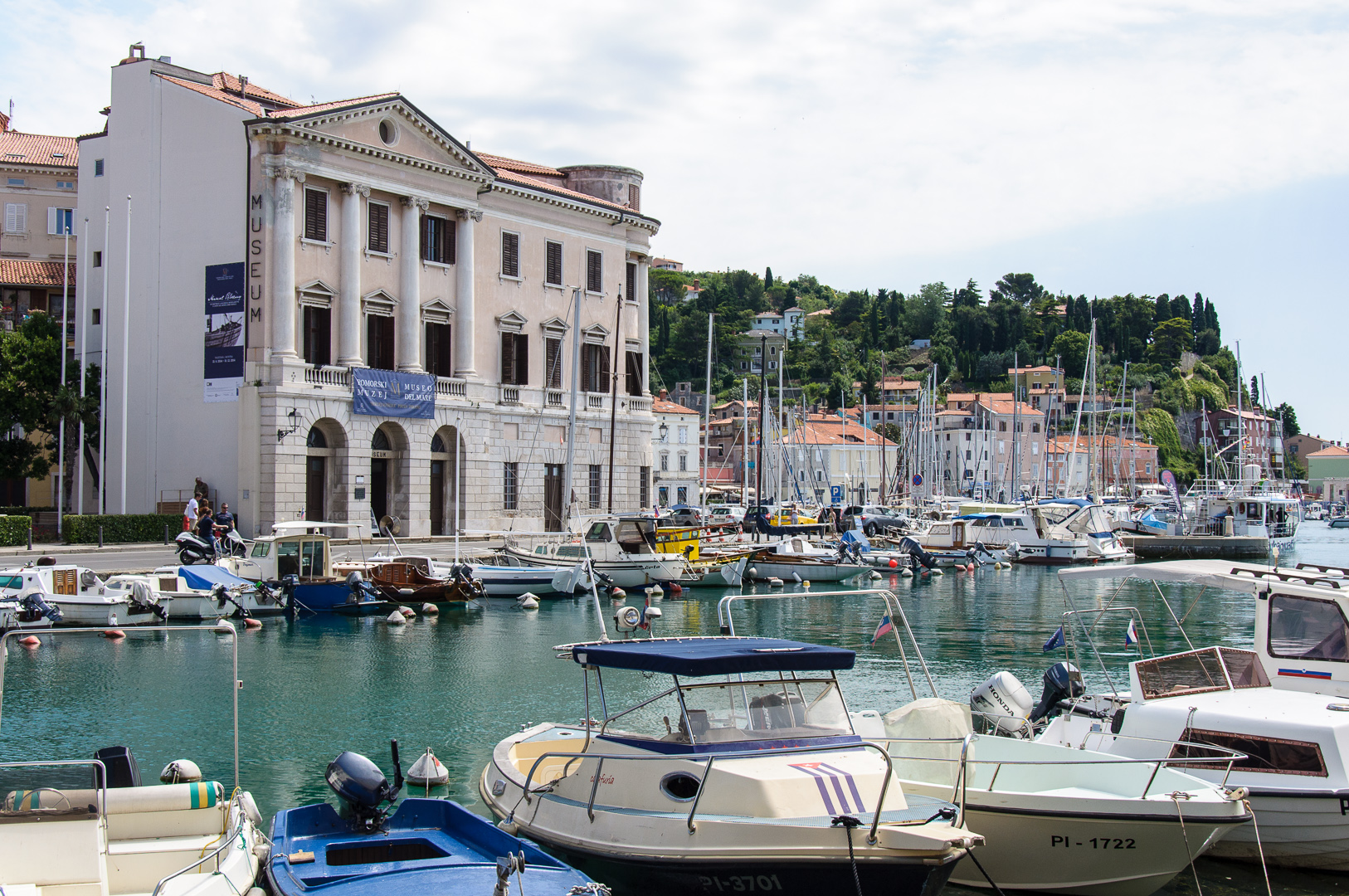
Sergej Mašera Maritime Museum in Piran

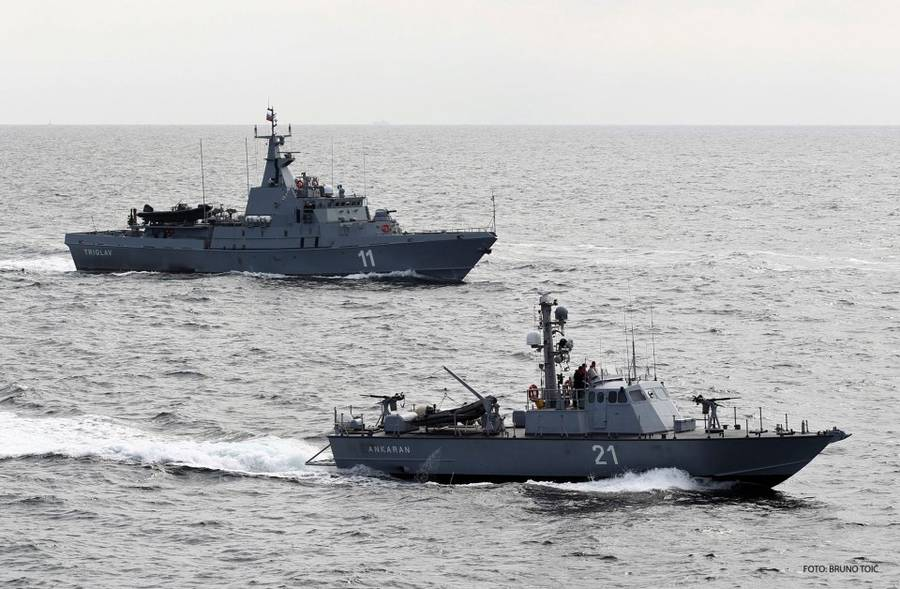
The Slovenian Ankaran and Triglav military patrol boats

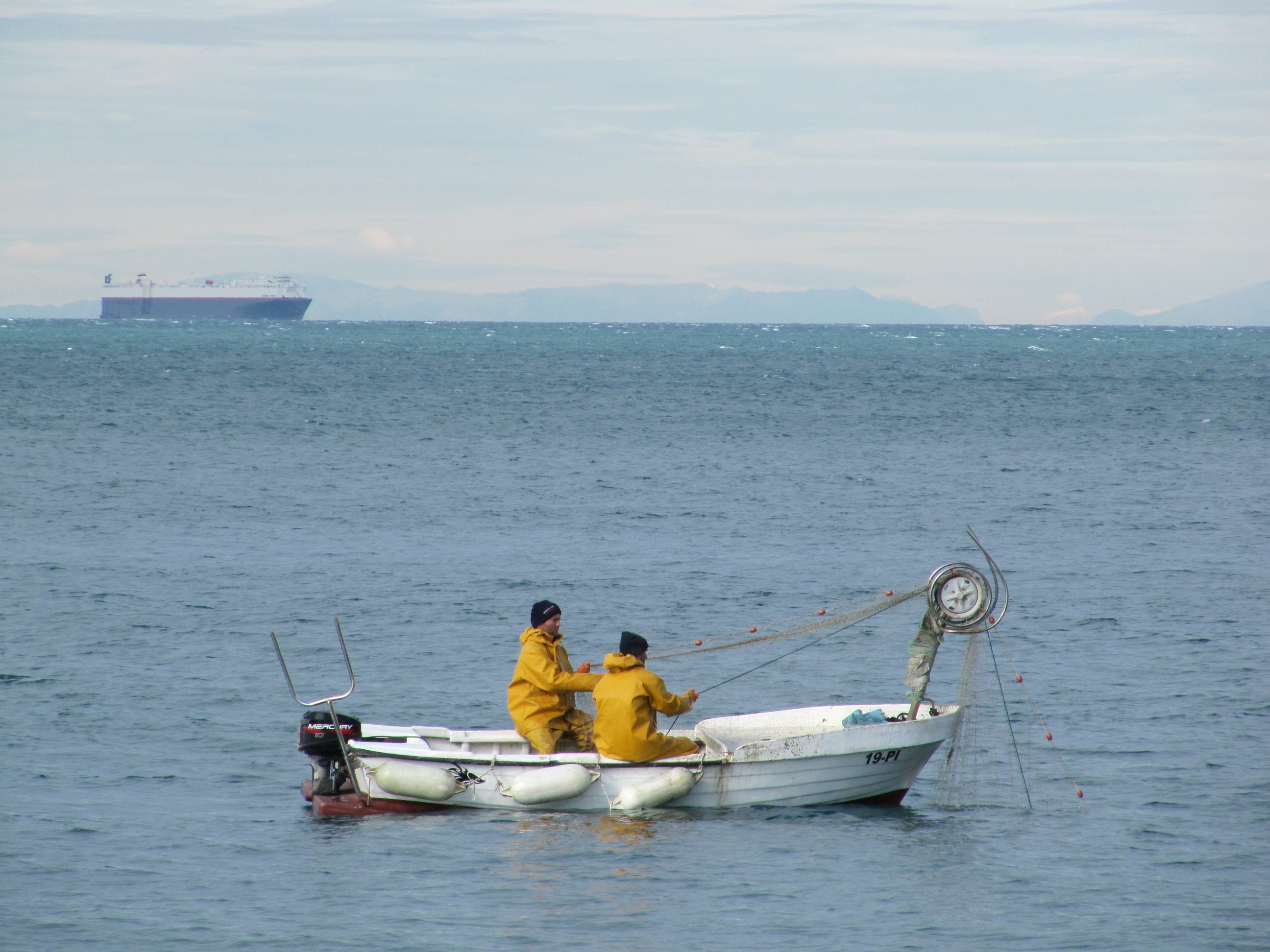
Fishermen on the Slovenian sea

The Maritime Day (Slovene: dan pomorstva) is an anniversary in Slovenia dedicated to maritime activities and history. It is celebrated annually on 7 March. It was established with a decree by the Government of Slovenia on 7 March 1996. The event was celebrated with the unveiling of an eco-friendly ship in 2019 and with the opening of a centre for maritime traffic control and management in crisis situation in 2021.

The date was chosen in remembrance of the passing of the Resolution on Maritime Strategy of the Republic of Slovenia on 7 March 1991. The resolution consists of three parts: 1) The declaration that Slovenia is a maritime country; 2) the undertaking to use the coastal region in a sustainable way, and 3) the undertaking to observe the international maritime rules. It is a short document that contains the general development orientations for Slovenian maritime sector. Opinions on how well it has been put to use are mixed.

Slovenia, which has 46.6 kilometres (29.0 mi) of the coast along the Adriatic Sea in the Gulf of Trieste, operates the Port of Koper with over 20 million tons of annual goods handling, the Faculty of Maritime Studies and Transport in Portorož, the Sergej Mašera Maritime Museum in Piran, and the Piran Marine Biological Station. Historically, in the maritime sector, the Slovenes were mostly involved with the Austro-Hungarian and Yugoslav Navy, and the Sečovlje saltpans as well as tourism in Portorož and fishing industry in Izola.
