= As a Man Thinketh =

Book by James Allen (1903)

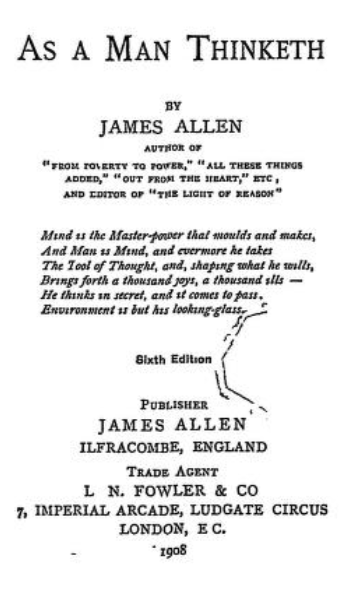
- Title page for As a Man Thinketh (1908)
- Author: James Allen
- Genre: self-help
- Publication date: 1903
- Text: As a Man Thinketh at Wikisource

As a Man Thinketh is a self-help book by James Allen, published in 1903.

It was described by Allen as "... [dealing] with the power of thought, and particularly with the use and application of thought to happy and beautiful issues. I have tried to make the book simple, so that all can easily grasp and follow its teaching, and put into practice the methods which it advises. It shows how, in his own thought-world, each man holds the key to every condition, good or bad, that enters into his life, and that, by working patiently and intelligently upon his thoughts, he may remake his life, and transform his circumstances. The price of the book is only one shilling, and it can be carried in the pocket."

Allen described it as "A book that will help you to help yourself", "A pocket companion for thoughtful people", and "A book on the power and right application of thought."

== Basis of the book ==
The title is influenced by a verse in the Bible from the Book of Proverbs, chapter 23, verse 7: "As a man thinketh in his heart, so is he". The full passage, taken from the King James Version, is as follows:

Eat thou not the bread of him that hath an evil eye, neither desire thou his dainty meats:
For as he thinketh in his heart, so is he:
Eat and drink, saith he to thee; but his heart is not with thee.
The morsel which thou hast eaten shalt thou vomit up, and lose thy sweet words.

While the passage suggests that one should consider the true motivations of a person who is being uncharacteristically generous before accepting his generosity, the title and content of Allen's work refer to the reader himself.

Allen's essay is in the public domain within the United States and most other countries. It was released in October 2003 as a Project Gutenberg e-text edition.
