= Mrs George de Horne Vaizey =

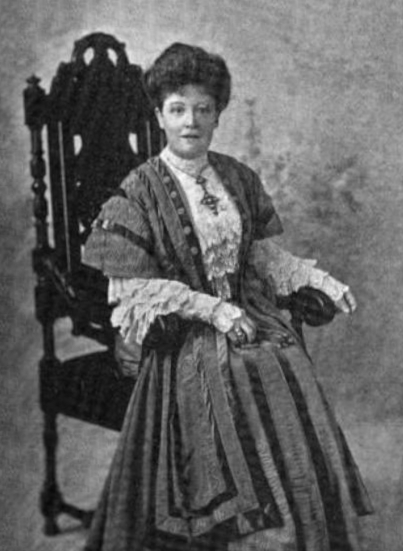
- In The Bookman, June 1908
- Born: Jessie Bell; 1857
- Died: 23 January 1917 (aged 59–60)
- Occupation: Writer
- Spouses: Henry Mansergh (m. 1883) George de Horne Vaizey (m. 1898)

Jessie Bell (1857 – 23 January 1917), later Jessie Mansergh, was an English writer born in Liverpool, who wrote under her married name Mrs George de Horne Vaizey.

== Life ==
De Horne Vaizey was the daughter of Scottish insurance broker David Bell, and his wife, Elizabeth Morris Barton, and had six siblings, four brothers and two sisters. She married Henry Mansergh, a cotton broker, in 1883. They had a daughter, Gwyneth Alice, in 1886. She met her second husband, George de Horne Vaizey, on a Mediterranean cruise, which she won in a short story competition. They married in Liverpool on 19 March 1898. Her son, named George after his father, also became a writer.

== Literature ==
As her biography at Athelstane Books notes, "She often used her own varied experiences in her books. She used situations from her early life in a large family, her first husband's addiction and death, and her own illnesses in her novels." De Horne Vaizey's daughter Gwyneth, nicknamed Kit, was the inspiration for the character Kitty in her 1902 work A Houseful of Girls. The author mentions that Gwyneth really did share lessons with a family of five sisters, who "in many ways were like the book Rendells. Chrystabel is as like as I could make her and they all talk In that funny way, emphasising every second or third word."

De Horne Vaizey was an invalid for many years before her death on 23 January 1917. Her obituary in the Sydney Morning Herald mentions that she had been "an invalid, crippled and confined to her bed for years".

== Views ==
De Horne Vaizey was quoted in Housekeeper magazine in 1909 on the differences between men and women, saying: "I'm convinced that men would be smaller minded still if they were in our place, so it's not as big as it seems. It's our life's work to do the small things, to save the small sums, and haggle over pennies, while men deal with the great affairs of life."

== Bibliography ==
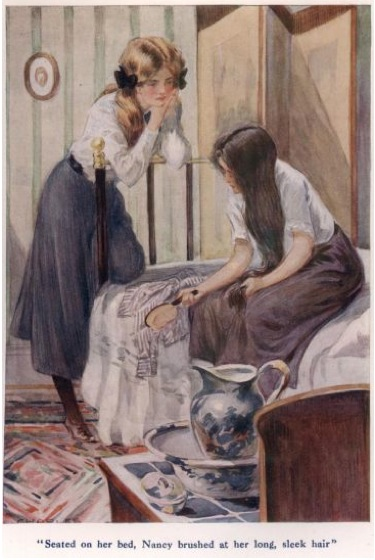
Artwork from Etheldreda the Ready published in 1910

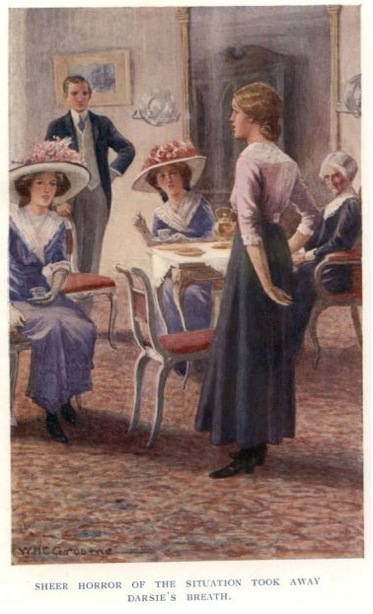
Artwork from A College Girl published in 1913

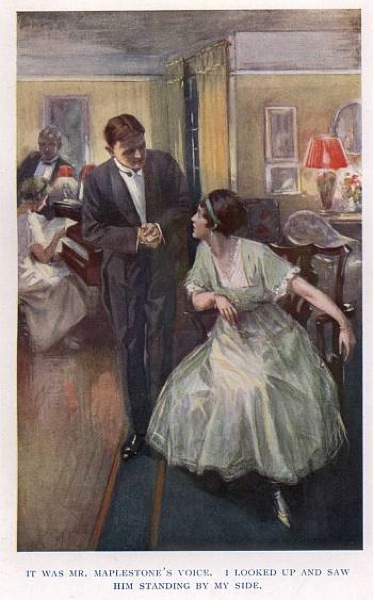
Artwork from The Lady of the Basement Flat published in 1917

- A Girl in Springtime (1897) (published under the name of Mrs. Henry Mansergh)
- A Rose Coloured Thread (1898) (published under the name of Mrs. Henry Mansergh)
- About Peggy Saville (1900) (originally published under the name of Jessie Mansergh)
- Sisters Three (1900)
- More About Peggy (1901)
- Tom and Some Other Girls: A Public School Story (1901)
- A Houseful of Girls (1902)
- Pixie O'Shaughnessy (1902)
- More About Pixie (1903)
- The Daughters of a Genius: A Story of Brave Endeavour (1903)
- How Like the King: The Week-end of Mr. Septimus Edward (1903)
- The Fortunes of the Farrells (1907)
- The Heart of Una Sackville (1907)
- Flaming June (1908)
- Big Game: A Story for Girls (1908)
- The Conquest of Chrystabel (1909)
- Old Friends and New (1909)
- A Question of Marriage (1910)
- Etheldreda the Ready: A School Story (1910)
- A Honeymoon in Hiding (1911)
- Cynthia Charrington (1911)
- The Adventures of Billie Belshaw (1912)
- Betty Trevor (1912)
- A College Girl (1914)
- An Unknown Lover (1913)
- Grizel Married (1914) (aka Lady Cassandra in America)
- The Love Affairs of Pixie (1914)
- Salt of Life (1915)
- The Independence of Claire (1915)
- What a Man Wills (1915)
- The Lady of the Basement Flat (1917)
- Harriet Mannering's Paying Guests (1917)
- The Right Arm, and Other Stories (1918)
