= Annie French Hector =

Irish novelist

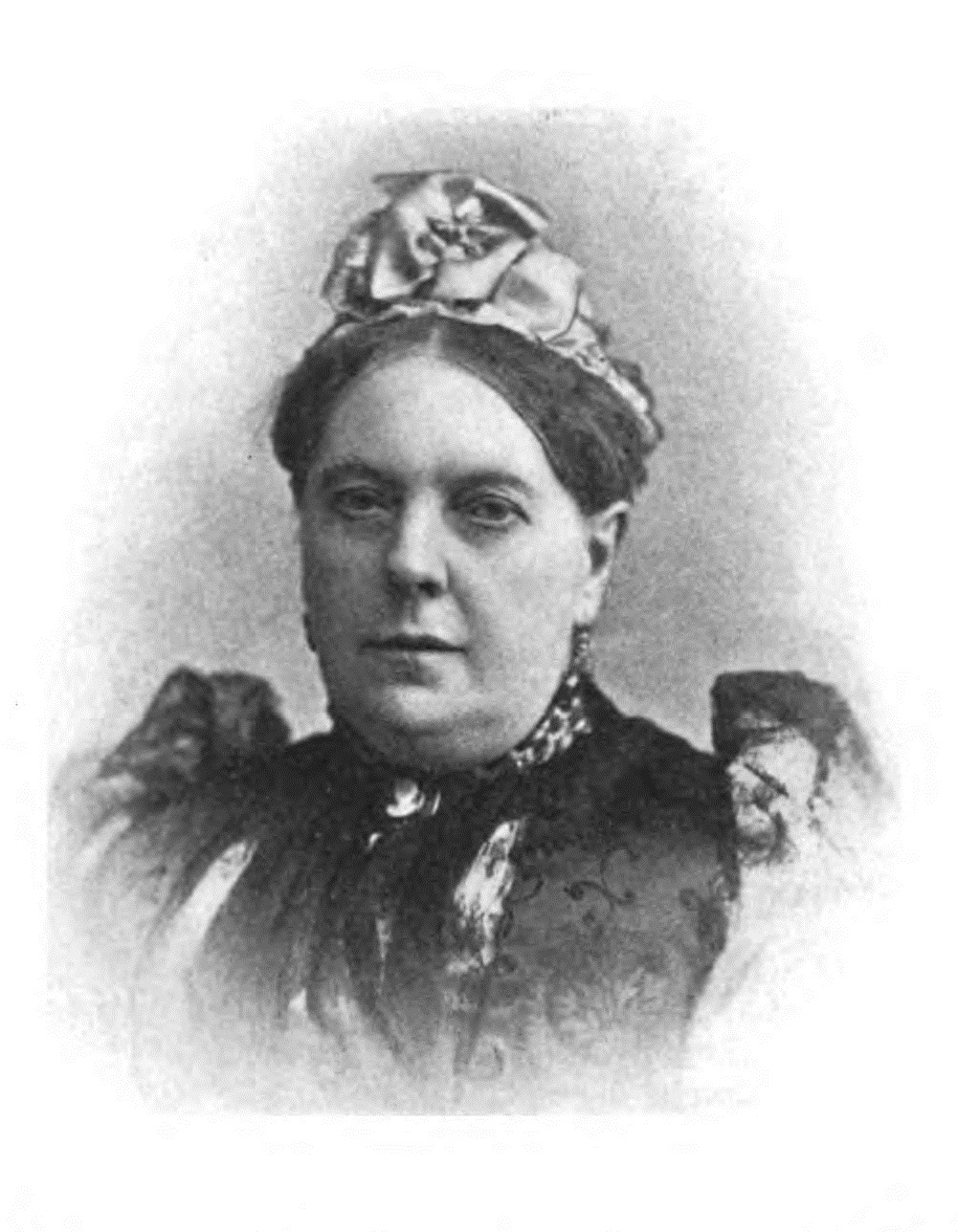
- Died: 10 July 1902
- Occupation: Writer

Anne "Annie" French Hector (Dublin, Ireland, 1825 – London, 10 July 1902) was a 19th-century Irish popular novelist who wrote under the pen name "Mrs Alexander". It has been noted that her works "typically revolve around a young girl torn between money, family and love, often complicated by a legacy."

== Life ==
Born in 1825, she was the only child of Robert French, a Dublin solicitor. Her family claimed to be descended from Irish gentry, the French family of Roscommon and Lord Annaly. On the paternal side, she was related to the poet Charles Wolfe and on her mother's side, to the Shakespearian scholar, Edmond Malone. Annie's father lost his money in 1844 and moved first to Liverpool, before settling in London.

In London, Annie French made some literary acquaintances, among them the novelists Anna Maria Hall and Eliza Lynn Linton and Household Words sub-editor W. H. Wills. She attracted attention in 1856 with an article in Household Words: "Billeted in Boulogne". She married the explorer and archaeologist Alexander Hector in 1858: "...Alexander Hector married his wife, Anne, on the 15th of April 1858 and there were issue of the marriage, four children, Ida, Alexander, Annie and Mary, aged respectively, ten, eight, five and three years. In October, 1870, Mrs. Hector gave instructions to her solicitors to present a petition in the Divorce Court for a separation, on the ground of cruelty and adultery, but the matter was compromised, and on the 10th of December, 1870, a deed of separation was executed between the defendant, Alexander Hector, of first part, Anne Hector, the wife, of second part..."

== Career ==
Annie wrote several novels during her early life, her first, Kate Vernon, in 1854. However, apparently her husband disapproved of her writing, and so during his lifetime she curtailed her pursuit of continuing to get her work published.

After her husband's death in 1875, she used his first name as her pseudonym and completed over forty novels as "Mrs Alexander", many of them published by George and Richard Bentley. All her books enjoyed wide popularity in the United States, notably The Wooing O't (1873), Ralph Wilton's Weird (1875), Her Dearest Foe (1876), The Freres (1882), A Golden Autumn (1897), A Winning Hazard (1897), and Kitty Costello (1902), her final novel, which was a quasi-autobiographical work detailing a young Irish girl's move to London. Other novels of hers included The Admiral's Ward (1883), The Executor (1885), A Crooked Path (1889) and The Snare of the Fowler (1892).

== Works ==
- Kate Vernon (1854)
- Agnes Waring: An Autobiography (1856)
- The Happy Cottage: A Tale of Summer's Sunshine (1856)
- Look Before you Leap (1865)
- Which Shall it Be? (1866)
- The Wooing O't (1873)
- Ralph Wilton's Weird (1875)
- The Heritage of Langdale (1877)
- Her Dearest Foe (1877)
- Maid, Wife or Widow?: An Episode of the '66 War (1879)
- The Freres (1882)
- The Admiral's Ward (1883)
- The Executor (1883)
- A Second Life (1885)
- At Bay (1885)
- Valerie's Fate (1885)
- By Woman's Wit (1886)
- Mona's Choice (1887)
- Beaton's Bargain (1887)
- A Life Interest (1888)
- A Crooked Path (1889)
- A False Scent (1889)
- Blind Fate (1890)
- Forging the Fetters (1890)
- A Woman's Heart (1891)
- Well Won (1891)
- Mammon (1892)
- For His Sake (1892)
- The Snare of the Fowler (1892)
- Found Wanting (1893)
- A Choice of Evils (1894)
- A Ward in Chancery (1894)
- What Gold Cannot Buy (1895)
- A Fight with Fate (1896)
- A Golden Autumn (1896)
- A Winning Hazard (1896)
- Barbara, Lady's Maid and Peeress (1897)
- Mrs. Crichton's Creditor (1897)
- The Cost of Her Pride (1898)
- The Step-Mother (1899)
- Brown, V.C. (1899)
- Through Fire to Fortune (1900)
- The Yellow Fiend (1901)
- A Missing Hero (1901)
- Stronger than Love (1902)
- Kitty Costello (1904)

== Sources ==
- Lee, Elizabeth (1912). "Hector, Annie French" . In Lee, Sidney (ed.). Dictionary of National Biography (2nd supplement). London: Smith, Elder & Co.
- Lee, Elizabeth; Lewin, C. G. "Hector, Annie (1825–1902)". Oxford Dictionary of National Biography (online ed.). Oxford University Press. doi:10.1093/ref:odnb/33797. (Subscription, Wikipedia Library access or UK public library membership required.)
