= James Allen (author) =

British philosophical writer (1864–1912)

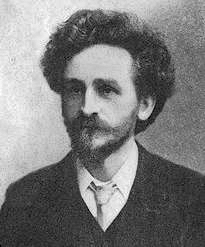
- Born: 28 November 1864; Leicester, Leicestershire, England
- Died: 24 January 1912 (aged 47); Ilfracombe, Devon, England
- Occupation: Author
- Spouse: Lily Louisa Oram
- Children: Nora Allen
- Writing career
- Language: English
- Years active: 1901–1912
- Genre: Non-fiction
- Subjects: Philosophy, self-help
- Notable work: As a Man Thinketh
- Literary movement: New Thought

James Allen (28 November 1864 – 24 January 1912) was a British philosophical writer known for his inspirational books and poetry and as a pioneer of the self-help movement. His best known work, As a Man Thinketh, has been mass-produced since its publication in 1903. It has been a source of inspiration to motivational and self-help authors.

== Biography ==
Born in Leicester, England, into a working-class family, Allen was the elder of two brothers. His mother could neither read nor write. His father, William, was a factory knitter. In 1879, following a downturn in the textile trade of central England, Allen's father travelled alone to America to find work and establish a new home for the family.

Within two days of arriving in the US, his father was pronounced dead at New York City Hospital, believed to be a case of robbery and murder. At age fifteen, with the family now facing economic disaster, Allen was forced to leave school and find work.

== Adulthood ==
For much of the 1890s, Allen worked as a private secretary and stationer in several British manufacturing firms. In 1893, Allen moved to London and later to South Wales, earning his living by journalism and reporting. In South Wales he met Lily Louisa Oram (Lily L. Allen) whom he wed in 1895.

In 1898, Allen found an occupation in which he could showcase his spiritual and social interests as a writer for the magazine, The Herald of the Golden Age. At this time, Allen entered a creative period where he published his first of many books, From Poverty to Power (1901). In 1902, Allen began to publish his own spiritual magazine, The Light of Reason, later retitled The Epoch.

In 1903, Allen published his third and most famous book As a Man Thinketh. Loosely based on the biblical passage of Proverbs 23:7, "As a man thinketh in his heart, so is he," the small work eventually became read around the world and brought Allen posthumous fame as one of the pioneering figures of modern inspirational thought. The book's minor audience allowed Allen to quit his secretarial work and pursue his writing and editing career.

In 1903, the Allen family retired to the town of Ilfracombe, where Allen spent the rest of his life. Continuing to publish The Epoch, Allen produced more than one book per year until his death in 1912, producing 19 works in total.

Following his death in 1912 from tuberculosis, his wife continued publishing The Epoch magazine. Lily Allen summarised her husband's literary mission in the preface to one of his posthumously published manuscripts, Foundation Stones to Happiness and Success saying:

"He never wrote theories, or for the sake of writing; but he wrote when he had a message, and it became a message only when he had lived it out in his own life, and knew that it was good. Thus he wrote facts, which he had proven by practice."

== Bibliography ==
- From Poverty to Power; or, The Realization of Prosperity and Peace (1901) [Contains The Path to Prosperity and The Way of Peace.]
- All These Things Added (1903) [Contains Entering the Kingdom and The Heavenly Life.]
- As a Man Thinketh (1903)
- Through the Gate of Good; or, Christ and Conduct (1903)
- Byways of Blessedness (1904)
- Out from the Heart (1904) [Sequel to "As a Man Thinketh"]
- Poems of Peace, including the lyrical-dramatic poem Eolaus (1907)
- The Heavenly Life (1907)
- The Life Triumphant: Mastering the Heart and Mind (1908)
- Morning and Evening Thoughts (1909)
- The Mastery of Destiny (1909)
- Above Life’s Turmoil (1910)
- From Passion to Peace (1910)
- Eight Pillars of Prosperity (1911)
- Man: King of Mind, Body and Circumstance (1911)
- Light on Life’s Difficulties (1912)
- Foundation Stones to Happiness and Success (1913)
- James Allen’s Book of Meditations for Every Day in the Year (1913) [Collection of earlier texts, compiled by his wife Lily L. Allen]
- Meditations; A Year Book (1913) [US version of James Allen's Book of Meditations for Every Day in the Year]
- Men and Systems (1914)
- The Shining Gateways (1915)
- The Divine Companion (1919)
