= Muhammad Zaki Abd al-Qadir =

Egyptian journalist and writer

- محمد زكي عبد القادر
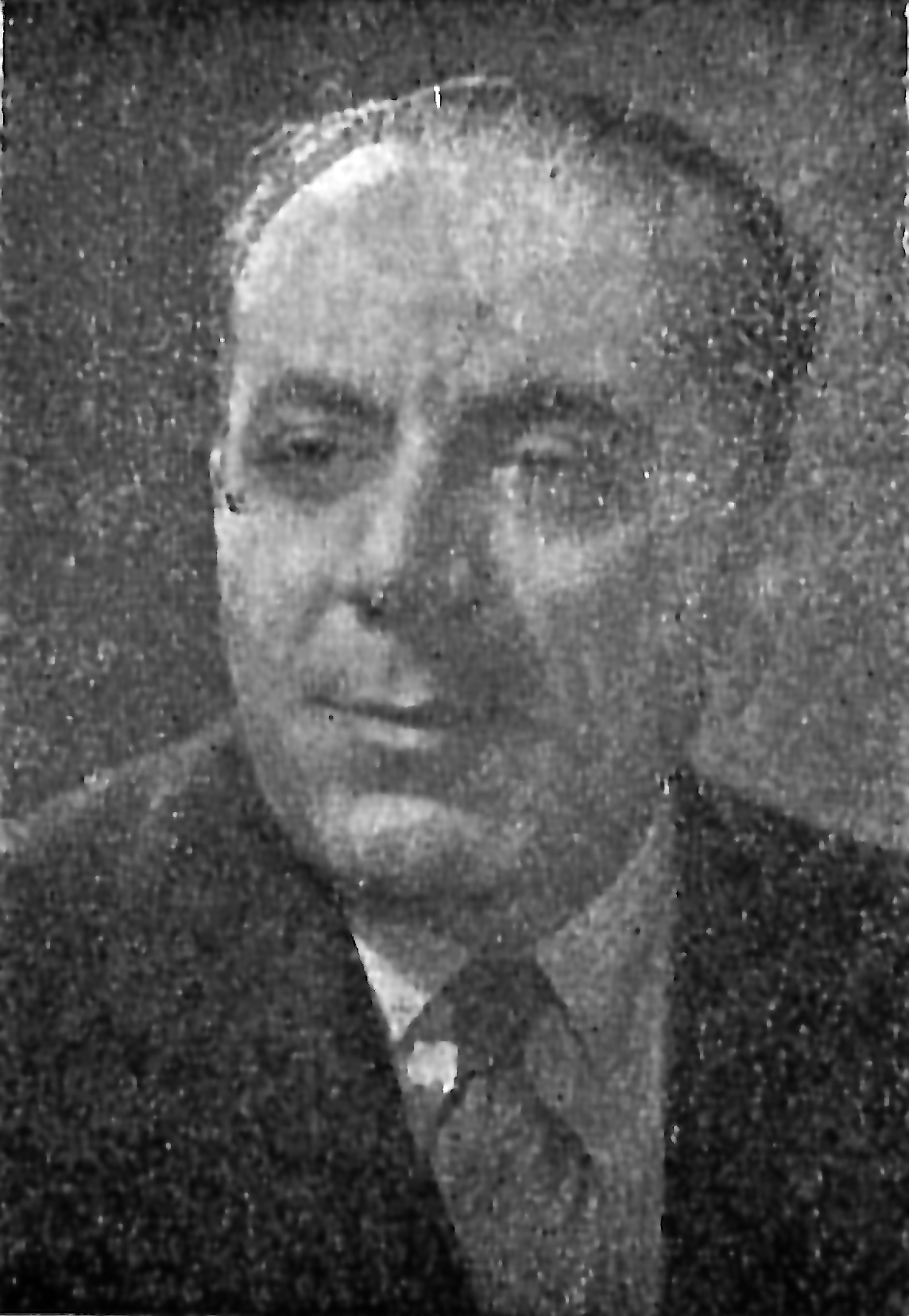
- Born: 1 January 1906; Farsis, Zagazig, Khedivate of Egypt
- Died: 7 March 1981 (aged 75); Cairo, Arab Republic of Egypt
- Education: Cairo University
- Occupations: journalist; writer; university teacher
- Writing career
- Language: Arabic
- Years active: 1929–1981

Muhammad Zaki Abd al-Qadir (Arabic: محمد زكي عبد القادر, ALA-LC: Muḥammad Zakī ʻAbd al-Qādir; 1 January 1906 – 7 March 1981) was an Egyptian journalist and multi-topic writer. Although he graduated from Cairo University in law in 1928, he turned to journalism. One of the 100 founding members of the Syndicate of Journalists in 1941, collaborated with various Egyptian notable newspapers, such as Akhbār al-Yawm and Al-Ahram. Publicly known by "Nahw Al-Noor" (Towards the Light), a column he wrote in 1950s, which formed the core of his new-style journalism. He also wrote many books in literary and non-literary, fiction and non-fiction subjects and was elected a member of the Academy of the Arabic Language in Cairo.

== Biography ==
Muhammad Zaki Abd al-Qadir was born on 1 January 1906 in the town of Farsis, Zagazig, in the Sharqia Governorate under Khedivate of Egypt. A grandson of the village mayor, He grew up in a large house inhabited by the mayor's family - his paternal grandfather - which made up of several small families, and everyone lives together in one household supported by the elder father, He who earns the family budget from the income of his agricultural property and dividing it among the members. Muhammad Zaki's father was engaged in trade independently although he was integrated into his small family in the large family but using his own funds. He completed his primary education in the American School in city of Zagazig, then joined the El-Elhamiya Secondary School in Cairo. Continued his higher education in the Faculty of Law, and obtained a Bachelor of Laws from Cairo University in 1928. After graduating, he worked as a lawyer for a while, then left it and entered the journalism. He had to spend some years until he reaches the age eligible to be accepted as a member of the Egyptian Lawyers Syndicate, so he turned to writing and journalism.

=== Journalism career ===
He worked as an editor for “Daily Al-Siyassiyah” of Liberal Constitutional Party, then the editor-in-chief of the “Weekly Al-Siyassiyah”, A newspaper that gave him the opportunity to get close to a large number of Egyptian thinkers at the time. He focused on the two topics of fiction and politics in "Al-Siyassiyah" until it was closed in 1931. He established the "Al-Fosoul" in 1944, a popular monthly cultural magazine, then worked with the "Al Sha'b" newspaper in 1936, where he took the foreign department. He also worked as an editor in "Al-Ahram" newspaper from 1937, then he moved to "Akhbār al-Yawm" in 1950, and became famous for his column "Nahw Al-Noor" (Towards the Light), And headed the editor-in-chief of Al-Mukhtar magazine. Nahw Al-Nur made his reputation as a journalist of ethics who reflecting "people's feelings and expressing their conscience", especially for farmers, workers and government employees before the July 23 revolution.

He continued his journalism work without retirement until his death. During his journalistic career, he had a weekly literary-cultural salon which he held in his office on Sharif Street. He is one of the 100 founding members of the Egyptian Journalists Syndicate in 1941. He was elected a member of the Academy of the Arabic Language in Cairo, And he was awarded an honorary fellowship in Eid el-Fan (Arts Holiday).

== Death ==
He died on 7 March 1982 in Cairo at the age of 75.

== Works ==
- Arabic: علي فراش الموت
- Arabic: عذاب الشهداء
- Arabic: دعاء الخطيئة
- Arabic: صور من الريف, romanized: Ṣuwar min al-rīf, 1949
- Arabic: محنة الدستور من 1923 - 1952, romanized: Miḥnat al-dustūr, 1923-1952, 1955
- Arabic: الحرية والكرامة الإنسانية : مجموعة أقوال, romanized: al-Ḥurrīyah wa-al-karāmah al-insānīyah : majmūʻat aqwāl, 1959
- Arabic: صور من أوروبا وأمريكا, romanized: Ṣuwar min Ūruba wa Amrīkā, 1960
- Arabic: أعيش مع رجل غريب, romanized: Aʻīshu maʻa rajulin gharīb, 1960
- Arabic: إرادة أم قدر, romanized: Irādah am qadar?, 1961
- Arabic: تأملات في الناس والحياه, romanized: Taʼammulāt fī al-nās wa-al-ḥayāh, 1962
- Arabic: رسائل ومسائل, romanized: Rasāʼil wa-masāʼil, 1963
- Arabic: الخيط المقطوع, romanized: al-Khayṭ al-maqṭūʻ, 1963
- Arabic: أبو مندور, romanized: Abū Mandūr, 1963
- Arabic: حياة مزدوجة: مذكرات رجل أودعني مذكراته, romanized: Ḥayāh muzdawajah, 1964
- Arabic: نماذج من النساء, romanized: Namādhij min al-nisāʼ, 1965
- Arabic: الخواجه أبرامينو, romanized: al-Khawājah Abrāmīnū, 1966
- Arabic: لست مسيحا أغفر الخطايا, romanized: Lastu Masīḥan aghfiru al-khaṭāyā, 1965
- Arabic: الدنيا تغيرت, romanized: al-Dunyā taghayyarat, 1966
- Arabic: أقدام على الطريق, romanized: Aqdām ʻalā al-ṭarīq, 1967
- Arabic: قالت له ..., romanized: Qālat lahu, 1968
- Arabic: وعاء الخطيئة, romanized: Wiʻāʼ al-ḫaṭīʼa, 1968
- Arabic: غرام أسيف, romanized: Gharām asīf, 1968
- Arabic: الهاتف من الداخل, romanized: al-Hātif min dākhil, 1970
- Arabic: مختارات من نحو النور, romanized: Mukhtārāt min Naḥwa al-nūr, 1971
- Arabic: ذنوب بلا مذنبين, romanized: Dhunūb bi-lā mudhnibīn, 1972
- Arabic: على حافة الخطيئة, romanized: ʻAlá ḥāffat al-khaṭīʼah, 1973
- Arabic: الله في الإنسان, romanized: Allāh . fī al-insān, 1976
- Arabic: قال التلميذ للأستاذ, romanized: Qāla al-tilmīdh . lil-ustādh, 1977
- Arabic: أجساد من تراب, romanized: Ajsād-min turāb, 1978
- Arabic: الصدفة العذراء, romanized: al-Ṣadafah al-ʻadhrāʼ, 1978
- Arabic: أشتات من الناس, romanized: Ashtāt min al-nās, 1980
- Arabic: مطلقة في الإنتظار، ونماذج بشرية أخرى, romanized: Muṭallaqah fī al-intiẓār, wa-namādhij basharīyah ukhrá, 1980
- Arabic: مذكرات وذكريات, romanized: Mudhakkirāt wa-dhikrayāt, 1982
