= List of best-selling books =

This page provides lists of best-selling books and book series to date and in any language. "Best-selling" refers to the estimated number of copies sold of each book, rather than the number of books printed or currently owned. Comics and textbooks are not included in this list. The books are listed according to the highest sales estimate as reported in reliable, independent sources.

According to Guinness World Records, the Bible is the best-selling book of all time with an estimated 5 to 7 billion copies sold and distributed as of 2021. Sales estimates for other printed religious texts include at least 800 million copies for the Qur'an and 200 million copies for the Book of Mormon. Additionally, a single publisher has produced more than 162.1 million copies of the Bhagavad Gita. Among non-religious texts, the Quotations from Chairman Mao Tse-tung, also known as the Little Red Book, has produced a wide array of sales and distribution figures—with estimates ranging from 800 million to over 6.5 billion printed volumes. Some claim the distribution ran into the "billions" and some cite "over a billion" official volumes between 1966 and 1969 alone as well as "untold numbers of unofficial local reprints and unofficial translations". Exact print figures for these and other books may also be missing or unreliable since these kinds of books may be produced by many different and unrelated publishers, in some cases over many centuries. All books of a religious, ideological, philosophical or political nature have thus been excluded from the lists of best-selling books below for these reasons.

Many books lack comprehensive sales figures as book selling and reselling figures prior to the introduction of point of sale equipment was based on the estimates of book sellers, publishers or the authors themselves. For example, one of the one-volume HarperCollins editions of The Lord of the Rings was recorded to have sold only 967,466 copies in the UK by 2009 (the source does not cite the start date), but at the same time the author's estate claimed global sales figures in excess of 150 million. Accurate figures are only available from the 1990s and in western nations such as the US, UK, Canada and Australia, although figures from the US are available from the 1940s. Further, e-books have not been included as out of copyright texts are often available free in this format. Examples of books with claimed high sales include The Count of Monte Cristo by Alexandre Dumas, Don Quixote by Miguel de Cervantes, Journey to the West by Wu Cheng'en and The Lord of the Rings by J. R. R. Tolkien—which has been sold as a three volume series; (Note: The Fellowship of the Ring, The Two Towers and The Return of the King) as a single combined volume; and as a six volume set. Hence, in cases where there is too much uncertainty, they are excluded from the list.

Having sold more than 600 million copies worldwide, Harry Potter by J. K. Rowling is the best-selling book series in history. The first novel in the series, Harry Potter and the Philosopher's Stone, has sold in excess of 120 million copies, making it one of the best-selling books of all time. As of June 2017, the series has been translated into 85 languages, placing Harry Potter among history's most translated literary works. The last four books in the series consecutively set records as the fastest-selling books of all time, and the final installment, Harry Potter and the Deathly Hallows, sold roughly 15 million copies worldwide within 24 hours of its release. With 12 million books printed in the first US run, it also holds the record for the highest initial print run for any book in history.

== Legend ==
Non-fiction

== List of best-selling individual books ==
=== More than 100 million copies ===
Book	Author(s)	Original language	First published	Approximate sales	Genre
A Tale of Two Cities	Charles Dickens	English	1859	>200 million	Historical fiction
The Little Prince (Le Petit Prince)	Antoine de Saint-Exupéry	French	1943	200 million	Fantasy
The Alchemist (O Alquimista)	Paulo Coelho	Portuguese	1988	150 million	Fantasy
Harry Potter and the Philosopher's Stone	J. K. Rowling	English	1997	120 million	Fantasy
And Then There Were None	Agatha Christie	English	1939	100 million	Mystery
Dream of the Red Chamber (紅樓夢)	Cao Xueqin	Chinese	1791	100 million	Family saga
The Hobbit	J. R. R. Tolkien	English	1937	100 million	Fantasy, children's fiction
Alice's Adventures in Wonderland	Lewis Carroll	English	1865	100 million	Fantasy, absurdist fiction

=== Between 50 million and 100 million copies ===
Book	Author(s)	Original language	First published	Approximate sales	Genre
She: A History of Adventure	H. Rider Haggard	English	1887	83 million	Adventure
The Da Vinci Code	Dan Brown	English	2003	80 million	Mystery thriller
Harry Potter and the Chamber of Secrets	J. K. Rowling	English	1998	77 million	Fantasy
The Catcher in the Rye	J. D. Salinger	English	1951	65 million	Coming-of-age
Sophie's World (Sofies verden)	Jostein Gaarder	Norwegian	1991	60 million	Philosophical novel, Young adult
The Bridges of Madison County	Robert James Waller	English	1992	60 million	Romance
One Hundred Years of Solitude (Cien años de soledad)	Gabriel García Márquez	Spanish	1967	50 million	Magic realism
Lolita	Vladimir Nabokov	English	1955	50 million	Novel
Heidi	Johanna Spyri	German	1880	50 million	Children's fiction
The Common Sense Book of Baby and Child Care	Benjamin Spock	English	1946	50 million	Manual
Anne of Green Gables	Lucy Maud Montgomery	English	1908	50 million	Children's novel
Black Beauty	Anna Sewell	English	1877	50 million	Children's literature
The Name of the Rose (Il Nome della Rosa)	Umberto Eco	Italian	1980	50 million	Historical novel, mystery
The Eagle Has Landed	Jack Higgins	English	1975	50 million	War, thriller
Watership Down	Richard Adams	English	1972	50 million	Children's fiction
The Hite Report	Shere Hite	English	1976	50 million	nonfiction
Charlotte's Web	E. B. White	English	1952	50 million	Children's fiction
The Ginger Man	J. P. Donleavy	English	1955	50 million	Novel
The Purpose Driven Life	Rick Warren	English	2002	50 million	Bible study

=== Between 20 million and 50 million copies ===
Book	Author(s)	Original language	First published	Approximate sales	Genre
The Tale of Peter Rabbit	Beatrix Potter	English	1902	45 million	Children's literature
Jonathan Livingston Seagull	Richard Bach	English	1970	44 million	Novella, self-help
The Very Hungry Caterpillar	Eric Carle	English	1969	43 million	Children's literature, picture book
A Message to Garcia	Elbert Hubbard	English	1899	40 million	Essay/literature
To Kill a Mockingbird	Harper Lee	English	1960	40 million	Southern Gothic, Bildungsroman
Flowers in the Attic	V. C. Andrews	English	1979	40 million	Gothic horror, family saga
Cosmos	Carl Sagan	English	1980	40 million	Popular science, anthropology, astrophysics, cosmology, philosophy, history
Angels & Demons	Dan Brown	English	2000	39 million	mystery-thriller
How to Win Friends and Influence People	Dale Carnegie	English	1936	>37 million	Self-help
Alcoholics Anonymous	William Griffith Wilson	English	1939	>37 million	Recovery
The BFG	Roald Dahl	English	1982	37 million	Children's literature
Fear of Flying	Erica Jong	English	1973	37 million	Romantic novel
How the Steel Was Tempered (Как закалялась сталь)	Nikolai Ostrovsky	Russian	1932	36.4 million copies in USSR	Socialist realist novel
War and Peace (Война и мир)	Leo Tolstoy	Russian	1869	36 million copies in Russia	Historical novel
The Adventures of Pinocchio (Le avventure di Pinocchio)	Carlo Collodi	Italian	1881	35 million	Fantasy, children's fiction
The Diary of Anne Frank (Het Achterhuis)	Anne Frank	Dutch	1947	35 million	Historical non-fiction, autobiography, memoir, bildungsroman / coming of age, Jewish literature
Your Erroneous Zones	Wayne Dyer	English	1976	35 million	Self-help
The Thorn Birds	Colleen McCullough	English	1977	33 million	Romantic family saga
Kane and Abel	Jeffrey Archer	English	1979	32.7 million	Novel
The Kite Runner	Khaled Hosseini	English	2003	31.5 million	Bildungsroman, historical fiction
Valley of the Dolls	Jacqueline Susann	English	1966	31 million	Novel
The Great Gatsby	F. Scott Fitzgerald	English	1925	30 million ("around")	Novel, tragedy
Gone with the Wind	Margaret Mitchell	English	1936	30 million (est.)	Historical fiction
Rebecca	Daphne du Maurier	English	1938	30 million (est.)	Gothic novel
The Revolt of Mamie Stover	William Bradford Huie	English	1951	30 million	Fiction
The Girl with the Dragon Tattoo (Män som hatar kvinnor)	Stieg Larsson	Swedish	2005	30 million	Fiction
The Lost Symbol	Dan Brown	English	2009	30 million	Fiction
The Hunger Games	Suzanne Collins	English	2008	29 million in US	Young adult fiction, dystopia
James and the Giant Peach	Roald Dahl	English	1961	28 million	Children's novel
Ben-Hur: A Tale of the Christ	Lew Wallace	English	1880	26 million in 1946	Novel
The Young Guard (Молодая гвардия)	Alexander Alexandrovich Fadeyev	Russian	1945	>26 million copies in USSR	Young adult historical novel
Who Moved My Cheese?	Spencer Johnson	English	1998	28 – 30 million	Self-help, motivational, business fable, psychology, leadership, parable
A Brief History of Time	Stephen Hawking	English	1988	25 million	Popular science
Paul et Virginie	Jacques-Henri Bernardin de Saint-Pierre	French	1788	25 million	Novel
Lust for Life	Irving Stone	English	1934	25 million	Biographical novel
The Wind in the Willows	Kenneth Grahame	English	1908	25 million	Children's literature
The 7 Habits of Highly Effective People	Stephen R. Covey	English	1989	25 million	Self-help
Totto-Chan: The Little Girl at the Window (窓ぎわのトットちゃん)	Tetsuko Kuroyanagi	Japanese	1981	25 million	Autobiographical novel
Sapiens: A Brief History of Humankind	Yuval Noah Harari	Hebrew	2011	25 million	History
Virgin Soil Upturned (Поднятая целина)	Mikhail Sholokhov	Russian	1935	>24 million copies in USSR	Novel
The Celestine Prophecy	James Redfield	English	1993	23 million	New-age spiritual novel
The Fault in Our Stars	John Green	English	2012	23 million	Young adult romantic novel
The Girl on the Train	Paula Hawkins	English	2015	23 million	Thriller
The Shack	William P. Young	English	2007	22.5 million	Novel
Uncle Styopa (Дядя Стёпа)	Sergey Mikhalkov	Russian	1936	>21 million copies in USSR	Children's Literature, picture book
The Godfather	Mario Puzo	English	1969	21 million	Crime novel
Love Story	Erich Segal	English	1970	21 million	Romance novel
Catching Fire	Suzanne Collins	English	2009	21 million in US	Young adult novel, adventure, dystopian, science fiction
Mockingjay	Suzanne Collins	English	2010	20 million in US	Young Adult novel, adventure, war, science fiction, action thriller
Kitchen (キッチン)	Banana Yoshimoto	Japanese	1988	20 million	Japanese novel
Andromeda Nebula (Туманность Андромеды)	Ivan Yefremov	Russian	1957	20 million	Science fiction novel
Gone Girl	Gillian Flynn	English	2012	20 million	Crime thriller novel
The Bermuda Triangle	Charles Berlitz	English	1974	20 million	
Things Fall Apart	Chinua Achebe	English	1958	20 million	Novel
Wolf Totem (狼图腾)	Jiang Rong	Chinese	2004	20 million	Semi-autobiographical novel
The Happy Hooker: My Own Story	Xaviera Hollander	English	1971	20 million	Memoir
Jaws	Peter Benchley	English	1974	20 million	Thriller
Love You Forever	Robert Munsch	English	1986	20 million	Children's literature, picture book, fiction
The Women's Room	Marilyn French	English	1977	20 million	Feminist novel
What to Expect When You're Expecting	Arlene Eisenberg and Heidi Murkoff	English	1984	20 million	Pregnancy guide
Adventures of Huckleberry Finn	Mark Twain	English	1885	20 million	Picaresque novel, Bildungsroman, satire, Robinsonade
The Secret Diary of Adrian Mole, Aged 13¾	Sue Townsend	English	1982	20 million	Young adult novel
Pride and Prejudice	Jane Austen	English	1813	20 million	Classic regency novel, romance
Kon-Tiki: Across the Pacific in a Raft (Kon-Tiki ekspedisjonen)	Thor Heyerdahl	Norwegian	1950	20 million	Travel literature
The Good Soldier Švejk (Osudy dobrého vojáka Švejka za světové války)	Jaroslav Hašek	Czech	1923	20 million (printed)	Unfinished satirical dark comedy novel
Where the Wild Things Are	Maurice Sendak	English	1963	20 million	Children's picture book
The Power of Positive Thinking	Norman Vincent Peale	English	1952	20 million	Self-help
The Secret	Rhonda Byrne	English	2006	20 million	Self-help
Dune	Frank Herbert	English	1965	20 million	Science fiction novel
Charlie and the Chocolate Factory	Roald Dahl	English	1964	20 million	Children's fantasy novel
The Naked Ape	Desmond Morris	English	1968	20 million	Social Science, Anthropology, Psychology
Kokoro (こゝろ)	Natsume Sōseki	Japanese	1914	20 million (as of 1994)	Novel

=== Between 10 million and 20 million copies ===
Book	Author(s)	Original language	First published	Approx. sales	Genre
Where the Crawdads Sing	Delia Owens	English	2018	18 million	Coming-of-age, murder mystery
Follow Your Heart (Va' dove ti porta il cuore)	Susanna Tamaro	Italian	1994	18 million	Sentimental, epistolary novel
Matilda	Roald Dahl	English	1988	17 million	Children's literature
The Book Thief	Markus Zusak	English	2005	16 million	Young adult fiction
The Horse Whisperer	Nicholas Evans	English	1995	16 million	
Goodnight Moon	Margaret Wise Brown	English	1947	16 million	Children's literature
The Neverending Story (Die unendliche Geschichte)	Michael Ende	German	1979	16 million	Children's literature
All the Light We Cannot See	Anthony Doerr	English	2014	15.3 million	Historical fiction, war novel
Fifty Shades of Grey	E. L. James	English	2011	15.2 million in the U.S.	Erotica
The Outsiders	S. E. Hinton	English	1967	15 million	Coming-of-age
Guess How Much I Love You	Sam McBratney	English	1994	15 million	Children's literature
Shōgun	James Clavell	English	1975	15 million	Historical fiction
The Poky Little Puppy	Janette Sebring Lowrey	English	1942	15 million	Children's literature
The Pillars of the Earth	Ken Follett	English	1989	15 million	Historical fiction
Perfume (Das Parfum)	Patrick Süskind	German	1985	15 million	
The Grapes of Wrath	John Steinbeck	English	1939	15 million	
The Shadow of the Wind (La sombra del viento)	Carlos Ruiz Zafón	Spanish	2001	15 million	Mystery
Interpreter of Maladies	Jhumpa Lahiri	English	2000	15 million	
Becoming	Michelle Obama	English	2018	14 million	Memoir
The Hitchhiker's Guide to the Galaxy	Douglas Adams	English	1979	14 million	Science fiction
Tuesdays with Morrie	Mitch Albom	English	1997	14 million	Memoir
God's Little Acre	Erskine Caldwell	English	1933	14 million	
A Wrinkle in Time	Madeleine L'Engle	English	1962	14 million	Young adult, science fiction
Long Walk to Freedom	Nelson Mandela	English	1994	14 million	
The Old Man and the Sea	Ernest Hemingway	English	1952	13 million	
Life After Life	Raymond Moody	English	1975	13 million	
Momo	Michael Ende	German	1973	13 million	Children's literature
Peyton Place	Grace Metalious	English	1956	12.1 million	
The Giver	Lois Lowry	English	1993	12 million	Dystopian fiction
Me Before You	Jojo Moyes	English	2012	12 million	
Norwegian Wood (ノルウェイの森)	Haruki Murakami	Japanese	1987	12 million	
The Plague (La Peste)	Albert Camus	French	1947	12 million	
No Longer Human (人間失格)	Osamu Dazai	Japanese	1948	12 million	
Man's Search for Meaning (Ein Psychologe erlebt das Konzentrationslager)	Viktor Frankl	German	1946	12 million	
The Subtle Art of Not Giving a Fuck	Mark Manson	English	2016	12 million	
The Divine Comedy (La Divina Commedia)	Dante Alighieri	Italian	1304	11–12 million (during the 20th century)	
Hairy Maclary from Donaldson's Dairy	Lynley Dodd	English	1983	11 million	Children's literature, picture book
The Prophet	Kahlil Gibran	English	1923	11 million	
The Boy in the Striped Pyjamas	John Boyne	English	2006	11 million	
The Exorcist	William Peter Blatty	English	1971	11 million	Horror
The Gruffalo	Julia Donaldson	English	1999	10.5 million	Children's literature, picture book
Fifty Shades Darker	E. L. James	English	2012	10.4 million in the U.S.	Erotica
Tobacco Road	Erskine Caldwell	English	1932	10 million	
Ronia, the Robber's Daughter	Astrid Lindgren	Swedish	1981	10 million	
The Cat in the Hat	Dr. Seuss	English	1957	10.5 million	Children's literature, picture book
Diana: Her True Story	Andrew Morton	English	1992	10 million	Biography
The Help	Kathryn Stockett	English	2009	10 million	
Catch-22	Joseph Heller	English	1961	10 million	
The Stranger (L'Étranger)	Albert Camus	French	1942	10 million	
Eye of the Needle	Ken Follett	English	1978	10 million	
The Lovely Bones	Alice Sebold	English	2002	10 million	
Wild Swans	Jung Chang	English	1992	10 million	
Santa Evita	Tomás Eloy Martínez	Spanish	1995	10 million	
Night (Un di Velt Hot Geshvign)	Elie Wiesel	Yiddish	1958	10 million	
Confucius from the Heart (于丹《论语》心得)	Yu Dan	Chinese	2006	10 million	
The Total Woman	Marabel Morgan	English	1974	10 million	
Knowledge-value Revolution (知価革命)	Taichi Sakaiya	Japanese	1985	10 million	
Problems in China's Socialist Economy (中国社会主义经济问题研究)	Xue Muqiao	Chinese	1979	10 million	
What Color Is Your Parachute?	Richard Nelson Bolles	English	1970	10 million	
The Dukan Diet	Pierre Dukan	French	2000	10 million	
The Joy of Sex	Alex Comfort	English	1972	10 million	
The Gospel According to Peanuts	Robert L. Short	English	1965	10 million	
Life of Pi	Yann Martel	English	2001	10 million	
The Front Runner	Patricia Nell Warren	English	1974	10 million	
The Goal	Eliyahu M. Goldratt	English	1984	10 million	
Fahrenheit 451	Ray Bradbury	English	1953	10 million	
Angela's Ashes	Frank McCourt	English	1996	10 million	
The Story of My Experiments with Truth (સત્યના પ્રયોગો અથવા આત્મકથા)	Mohandas Karamchand Gandhi	Gujarati	1925–1929	10 million	
Bridget Jones's Diary	Helen Fielding	English	1996	10 million (as of 2005)	
It Ends with Us	Colleen Hoover	English	2016	10 million	Romance, Fiction
My Brilliant Friend	Elena Ferrante	Italian	2011	10 million	Literary fiction, Autofiction

== List of best-selling book series ==
=== More than 100 million copies ===
Book series	Author(s)	Original language	No. of installments	Years of Publication	Approximate sales
Harry Potter	J. K. Rowling	English	7 + 3 companion books + 4 scripts	1997–2007	600 million
Goosebumps	R. L. Stine	English	62 + spin-off series	1992–present	400 million
Perry Mason	Erle Stanley Gardner	English	82 + 4 short stories	1933–1973	300 million
Diary of a Wimpy Kid	Jeff Kinney	English	20 + 9 spin-offs + 1 unofficial book	2004–present	300 million
Choose Your Own Adventure	Various authors	English	185+	1979–present	270 million
Berenstain Bears	Stan and Jan Berenstain	English	428	1962–present	260 million
Mr. Men and Little Miss	Roger Hargreaves, Adam Hargreaves	English	90+	1971-present	250 million
Sweet Valley High	Francine Pascal and ghostwriters	English	400	1983–2003	250 million
Noddy	Enid Blyton, various other authors	English	24 (original series)	1949–present	250 million
Jack Reacher	Lee Child	English	30 Novels + 25 Short Stories	1997–present	200 million
The Railway Series and Thomas & Friends	Wilbert Awdry, Christopher Awdry, various other authors	English	42 (The Railway Series)	1945–present	200 million
Nancy Drew	Various authors as Carolyn Keene	English	175	1930–present	200 million
San-Antonio	Frédéric Dard	French	173	1949–2001	200 million
Robert Langdon	Dan Brown	English	6	2000–present	200 million
Geronimo Stilton	Elisabetta Dami	Italian	200+	1997–present	180 million
Percy Jackson & the Olympians	Rick Riordan	English	7 + 5 companion books + 4 spin-off series	2005–present	180 million
The Baby-sitters Club	Ann Martin	English	335	1986–present	172 million
American Girl	Various authors	English	141 + spin-off series	1986–present	160 million
Twilight	Stephenie Meyer	English	4 + 2 companion books + 1 novella	2005–2020	160 million
Star Wars	Various authors	English	over 300	1977–present	160 million
Little Critter	Mercer Mayer	English	over 200	1975–present	150 million
Peter Rabbit	Beatrix Potter	English	6	1902–1930	150 million
Fifty Shades	E. L. James	English	3	2011–2015	150 million
Chicken Soup for the Soul	Jack Canfield, Mark Victor Hansen	English	105	1997–present	130 million
Clifford the Big Red Dog	Norman Bridwell	English	91	1963–2014	129 million
Frank Merriwell	Gilbert Patten	English	209	1896–1936	125 million
Dirk Pitt	Clive Cussler	English	24	1973–present	120 million
宮本武蔵 (Musashi)	Eiji Yoshikawa	Japanese	7	1935–1939	120 million
The Chronicles of Narnia	C. S. Lewis	English	7	1950–1956	120 million
SAS	Gérard de Villiers	French	200	1965–2013	120 million
A Song of Ice and Fire	George R. R. Martin	English	5 + 2 companion books + 3 novellas (compiled)	1996–present	100 million
The Hunger Games	Suzanne Collins	English	5	2008–present	100 million
James Bond	Ian Fleming	English	14	1953–1966	100 million
Martine	Gilbert Delahaye, Marcel Marlier	French	60	1954–2014	100 million
Millennium	Stieg Larsson, David Lagercrantz	Swedish	6	2005–present	100 million

=== Between 50 million and 100 million copies ===
Book series	Author(s)	Original language	No. of installments	First published	Approximate sales
The Wheel of Time	Robert Jordan, Brandon Sanderson	English	15	1990–2013	90 million
Discworld	Terry Pratchett	English	41	1983–2015	90 million
Nijntje (Miffy)	Dick Bruna	Dutch	119	1955–present	85 million
Alex Cross	James Patterson	English	21	1993–present	81 million
Anpanman (アンパンマン)	Takashi Yanase	Japanese	150 picture books	1973–2013	80 million
Captain Underpants	Dav Pilkey	English	12 plus spinoffs	1997–2015	80 million
Fear Street	R. L. Stine	English	114	1989–present	80 million
Pippi Långstrump (Pippi Longstocking)	Astrid Lindgren	Swedish	3 + 3 picture books	1945–2001	80 million
The Vampire Chronicles	Anne Rice	English	13	1976–2021	80 million
OSS 117	Jean Bruce	French	265	1949–1992	75 million
Winnie-the-Pooh	A. A. Milne	English	2	1926–1928	70 million
Magic Tree House series	Mary Pope Osborne	English	56	1992–present	70 million
Left Behind	Tim LaHaye, Jerry B. Jenkins	English	16	1996–2007	65 million
A Series of Unfortunate Events	Lemony Snicket aka Daniel Handler	English	13	1999–2006	65 million
Arthur	Marc Brown	English	27 (Arthur Adventure)	1976-present	65 million
Little House on the Prairie	Laura Ingalls Wilder	English	12	1932–2006	60 million
All Creatures Great and Small	Alf Wight, as James Herriot	English	8	1970–1992	60 million
The Magic School Bus	Joanna Cole	English	131	1986–2010	58 million
Where's Wally?	Martin Handford	English	13	1987–present	55 million
Men Are from Mars, Women Are from Venus	John Gray	English	15	1992–present	50 million
The Hardy Boys	Various authors as Franklin W. Dixon	English	190	1927–present	50 million
The Bobbsey Twins	Various authors as Laura Lee Hope	English	72	1904–1979	50 million
Tarzan	Edgar Rice Burroughs	English	26	1914–1995	50 million

=== Between 30 million and 50 million copies ===
Book series	Author(s)	Original language	No. of installments	First published	Approximate sales
The Shadowhunter Chronicles	Cassandra Clare	English	17 + 8 companion books	2007–present	50 million
Earth's Children	Jean M. Auel	English	6	1980–2011	45 million
A Child's First Library of Learning	Various authors	English	29	1980–	45 million
Junie B. Jones	Barbara Park	English	30	1992–2013	44 million
Harry Bosch	Michael Connelly	English	15	1992–	42 million
Harry Hole	Jo Nesbø	Norwegian	13	1997–present	40 million
Warriors	Various authors as Erin Hunter	English	78	2003–present	40 million
连环画 铁道游击队 (Picture-and-story book Railway Guerilla)	original author: Liu Zhixia	Chinese	10	1955–1962	36.52 million
かいけつゾロリ (Kaiketsu Zorori)	Yutaka Hara	Japanese	60	1987–present	35 million
Paddington Bear	Michael Bond	English	70	1958–present	35 million
Animorphs	K A Applegate and ghostwriters	English	54	1996–2001	35 million
Divergent trilogy	Veronica Roth	English	3 + 1 companion book	2011–2013	35 million
ノンタン (Nontan)	Sachiko Kiyono	Japanese	40	1976–2016	33.6 million
グイン・サーガ (Guin Saga)	Kaoru Kurimoto, Yu Godai	Japanese	149	1979–2024	33 million
The Inheritance Cycle	Christopher Paolini	English	5 + 1 companion book	2002–2023	33 million
Rich Dad, Poor Dad	Robert Kiyosaki, Sharon Lechter	English	18	1997–	32 million
とある魔術の禁書目録 (Toaru Majutsu no Index)	Kazuma Kamachi	Japanese	46	2004–	30 million
徳川家康 (Tokugawa Ieyasu)	Sōhachi Yamaoka	Japanese	26	1950–1967	30 million
Ramona	Beverly Cleary	English	8	1955–1999	30 million
The Dark Tower	Stephen King	English	8	1982–2012	30 million
Dork Diaries	Rachel Renée Russell	English	15	2009–present	55 million
The Destroyer	Warren Murphy and Richard Sapir, various authors	English	150	1971–present	30 million
The Ramses Saga	Christian Jacq	French	5	1997-1998	35 million

=== Between 20 million and 30 million copies ===
Book series	Author(s)	Original language	No. of installments	First published	Approximate sales	Genre
地球往事 (Remembrance of Earth's Past)	Liu Cixin	Chinese	3	2008–2010	29 million	science fiction
三毛猫ホームズシリーズ (Calico Cat Holmes series)	Jirō Akagawa	Japanese	43	1978–present	28 million	detective, mystery
Curious George	Hans Augusto Rey and Margret Rey	English	58	1941–present	27 million	Children's Literature
Shannara	Terry Brooks	English	20	1977–present	26 million	
Kurt Wallander	Henning Mankell	Swedish	10	1991–2002	25 million	
Sagan om Isfolket (The Legend of the Ice People)	Margit Sandemo	Swedish	47	1982–1989	25 million	
The Sword of Truth	Terry Goodkind	English	21	1998–present	25 million	
Outlander	Diana Gabaldon	English	8	1991–present	25 million	
ズッコケ三人組 (Zukkoke Sanningumi)	Masamoto Nasu	Japanese	50	1978–2004	25 million	Children's Literature
鬼平犯科帳 (Onihei Hankachō)	Shōtarō Ikenami	Japanese	24	1968–1990	24.4 million, only bunkobon	jidaigeki
Brain Quest	Various authors	English		1992–present	23.7 million	
South Beach Diet	Arthur Agatston	English	6	2003–present	22 million	
His Dark Materials	Philip Pullman	English	3	1995–2000	22 million	Fantasy
ソードアート・オンライン (Sword Art Online)	Reki Kawahara	Japanese	27	2009–present	30 million	
竜馬がゆく (Ryoma ga Yuku)	Ryōtarō Shiba	Japanese	5	1963–1966	21.5 million	jidaigeki
Artemis Fowl	Eoin Colfer	English	8 + 1 companion book	2001–2012	21 million	
The Cosmere	Brandon Sanderson	English	30+	2005–present	21 Million	
Dune series	Frank Herbert	English	30+	1965	20 million	Science fiction novel
I Survived	Lauren Tarshis	English	25	2010–2020	>20 million	
Découvertes Gallimard	Various authors	French	more than 700	1986–present	>20 million	
Redwall	Brian Jacques	English	22	1986–2011	20 million	
Maisy	Lucy Cousins	English	23	1990–present	20 million	
Dragonlance	Various authors	English	more than 150	1984–present	20 million	
幻魔大戦 (Genma Taisen)	Kazumasa Hirai	Japanese	20	1979–1983	20 million	
青春の門 (The Gate of Youth)	Hiroyuki Itsuki	Japanese		1970–present	20 million	
スレイヤーズ (Slayers)	Hajime Kanzaka	Japanese	50	1989–present	20 million	
The Foundation Trilogy	Isaac Asimov	English	3	1950–1953	20 million	
Horrible Histories	Terry Deary	English	24	1993–present	20 million	
Rainbow Magic	Daisy Meadows	English	80+	2003–present	20 million	
Morgan Kane	Louis Masterson	Norwegian	90	1966–	20 million	
The Southern Vampire Mysteries	Charlaine Harris	English	13	2001–2013	20 million	

=== Between 15 million and 20 million copies ===
Book series	Author(s)	Original language	No. of instalments	First published	Approximate sales
Doc Savage	Lester Dent, various authors	English	203	1933–present	20 million
涼宮ハルヒシリーズ (Haruhi Suzumiya Series)	Nagaru Tanigawa	Japanese	11	2003–present	20 million
Kicia Kocia	Anita Głowińska	Polish	77	2010–present	20 million
一億人の昭和史 (1-oku nin no Shōwa shi / Shōwa History of 100 million people)	Tomiyasu Takahara, Various authors	Japanese	95	1975–1980	19 million
科学のアルバム (Kagaku no album / Science's Album)	Various authors	Japanese		1970–present	19 million
剣客商売 (Kenkaku Shōbai)	Shotaro Ikenami	Japanese	18	1972–1989	18 million
Erast Fandorin series	Boris Akunin	Russian	12	1998–present	18 million
Dragonriders of Pern	Anne McCaffrey	English	23	1967–present	18 million
吸血鬼ハンターD (Vampire Hunter D)	Hideyuki Kikuchi	Japanese	39	1983–present	17 million
The Hitchhiker's Guide to the Galaxy	Douglas Adams, plus a final book by Eoin Colfer	English	6	1979–2008	16 million
ぼくらシリーズ (Bokura series)	Osamu Soda	Japanese	36	1985–present	15 million
Bridget Jones	Helen Fielding	English	3	1996–present	15 million
銀河英雄伝説 (Legend of the Galactic Heroes)	Yoshiki Tanaka	Japanese	14	1982–1989	15 million
The No. 1 Ladies Detective Agency	Alexander McCall Smith	English	23	1999–present	15 million
Der Regenbogenfisch (Rainbow Fish)	Marcus Pfister	German		1992–present	15 million
The Riftwar Cycle	Raymond E. Feist	English	25	1982–present	15 million
The Thrawn trilogy	Timothy Zahn	English	3	1991–93	15 million
Wiedźmin (The Witcher)	Andrzej Sapkowski	Polish	9	1990–2013	15 million
14ひきのシリーズ (The family of fourteen)	Kazuo Iwamura	Japanese		1983–present	15 million

=== Notes ===
The Perry Rhodan series has sold more than 1 billion copies, but is not listed because that figure includes magazine sales, not novels alone. Similarly, the Jerry Cotton series has sold over 300 million copies and the John Sinclair series sold more than 250 million copies, but most of these were also in dime novel format.

The figures given for some books are for the number printed instead of confirmed sales, which means that not all of the copies printed were necessarily sold.

== List of best-selling regularly updated books ==
=== More than 100 million copies ===
Book	Author(s)	Original language	First published	Approximate sales
新华字典 (Xinhua Zidian / Xinhua Dictionary)	Chief editor: Wei Jiangong	Chinese	1957	567 million
Scouting for Boys	Robert Baden-Powell	English	1908	100–150 million
The McGuffey Readers	William Holmes McGuffey	English	1853	125 million
Guinness World Records (published every year)	Various authors	English	1955	115 million
六星占術によるあなたの運命 (Rokusei Senjutsu (Six-Star Astrology) Tells Your Fortune)	Kazuko Hosoki; Kaori Hosoki	Japanese	1986	101.2 million
American Spelling Book (Webster's Dictionary)	Noah Webster	English	1783	100 million

=== Between 50 million and 100 million copies ===
Book	Author(s)	Original language	First published	Approximate sales
World Almanac (published every year)	Various authors	English	1868–76; 1886–present	82 million
Betty Crocker Cookbook	General Mills staff	English	1950–2016 (12th edition)	75 million
Tung Shing (Chinese: 通勝)	Choi Park Lai's family, among others	Chinese	1891(Only counting versions published by Choi's family)	>70 million (Only counting version published by Choi)
Merriam-Webster's Collegiate Dictionary	Merriam-Webster	English	1898	55 million

=== Between 30 million and 50 million copies ===
Book	Author(s)	Original language	First published	Approximate sales
Roget's Thesaurus	Peter Mark Roget	English	1852–	40 million
できるシリーズ (Dekiru Series)	Impress Dekiru Series Editorial Desk	Japanese	1994–present	40 million
Better Homes and Gardens New Cook Book	Various authors	English	1930–	38 million
The Art of Mathematics	Hong Sung-dae	Korean	1966–present	37 million ~ 40 million
Oxford Advanced Learner's Dictionary	A. S. Hornby	English	1948	30 million
Le guide Michelin France (The Michelin Guide France) (published every year)	Various authors	French	1900–present	30 million

=== Between 20 million and 30 million copies ===
Book	Author(s)	Original language	First published	Approximate sales
超図解シリーズ (Cho-Zukai series)	X media	Japanese	1996–2007	25 million
自由自在 (Jiyu Jizai)	Various authors	Japanese	1953–present	24 million
新明解国語辞典 (Shin Meikai kokugo jiten)	Tadao Yamada	Japanese	1972	20.4 million
English Grammar	Lindley Murray	English	1795	20 million

== See also ==
- List of best-selling light novels
- List of best-selling comic series
- List of best-selling manga
- List of best-selling fiction authors
- Publishers Weekly lists of bestselling novels in the United States
- List of literary works by number of translations
- Lists of books
