= Yu Dan =

Yu Dan may refer to:

- Yu Dan (academic) (born 1965), Chinese academic
- Yu Dan (sport shooter) (born 1987), Chinese sports shooter
