= Hatara Kizzu Maihamu Gumi =

Television series

- Master Hamsters

はたらキッズ マイハム組 (Hatara Kizzu Maihamu Gumi)
- Genre: Action, Sentai
- Created by: Izumi Todo
- Anime television series
- Directed by: Tetsuo Imazawa
- Written by: Takashi Yamada
- Studio: Toei Animation
- Original network: TV Asahi, BS Asahi
- Original run: October 7, 2007 – October 5, 2008
- Episodes: 50
- Manga
- Published by: Popurasha
- Magazine: Pre Comic Bunbun
- Original run: December 2007 – present

Hatara Kids Maihamu Gumi (はたらキッズ マイハム組, Hatara Kizzu Maihamu Gumi), literally "Working Kids, Meister Hamster Team", is a Japanese anime series for young children about hamsters who hold down jobs from firefighting to cooking. The show is produced by Toei Animation and was broadcast at on Sundays from 6:30 to 7:00 am from October 7, 2007, to October 5, 2008, on Japan's TV Asahi. The show was also broadcast from 6:00 to 6:30 pm on Friday every week from November 2, 2007, on BS Asahi, but moved its broadcast to 5:00 to 5:30 pm on Friday of every week since October 10, 2008. Broadcast on BS Asahi concluded after November 14, 2008.

The series has been dubbed and aired in French, Italian, and Catalan as "Master Hamsters". It also aired in the Philippines on GMA 7 under the same title. This was presumably a Tagalog dub and there is currently no info on whether an English dub exists.

== Plot ==
Gaudi is a master hamster in woodworking. He works in Hoshihama, the City of Masters, with his owner Kaito. He goes to the city with the intention of achivieng the Master Title, the higher category a professional can aim for, and the dream of all hamsters. There, he meets new friends like Sylvie, Jean, Alec and Steve; together they live great adventures. When humans get into trouble, Master Hamsters appear to help them with their skills such as firefighting, cooking or carpentry. If humans knew about their existence they would make their life impossible so, to avoid being exposed, they say there is an invisible hero who solves the city problems.

== Characters ==
- Gaudi: One-star woodworking master and an architect. Gaudi is fast and quick when working. Sometimes he takes decisions without thinking which lead him into mess. Passionate, enthusiastic and optimistic, Kaito's hamster, whom he considers as his elder brother, also has a great sense for justice. His dream is becoming a Grand Master like his dad Garnier and the Master Superior.
- Sylvie: Three-star pastry chef and with more than 1000 receipts in her head, Sylvie is the idol of the Master Hamsters. Cute and smart, everybody falls in love with her. Actually, when she looks at you and says: "S'il vous plaît" with that cute face, is impossible to say no to whatever she asks. Even less if you have just eaten one of her cakes. They are delicious! She's Mizuki's hamster and they are really good friends.
- Alec: Firefighter from the burning star, Alec is the stronger of the group and the key of the rescue patrol. Brave and resolute, he never hesitates getting into action, especially when someone's in danger. Also, he is really kind and is always cleaning up Gaudi and Sylvie's messes. He lives at the Master's house.
- Jean: Doctor Master from the brightening star. She understands many languages and she is a computing genius. She is the most romantic of all the hamsters. Her owner is Marina, the prettier girl at school.
- Steve: Pilot Master from the shooting star. Steve can control every type of radio-controlled car like if he was a Formula One champion. He is Daisuke's hamster. Handsome and vain, he often argues with Gaudi for his behaviour.
- Master: The Master Superior is the person in charge of giving the Master titles. He is a surprising hamster, a wise man, but also really humorous.

== Episodes ==
No.	Title	Directed by	Written by	Original release date
1	"Carpenter's star! Worker Hamster is born!!" "Daiku (Dēku) no Hoshi! Shogoto Hito Hamustā Tanjō!" (Japanese: 大工(でえく)の星!仕事人ハムスター誕生!!)	Tetsuo Imazawa	Takashi Yamada	October 7, 2007
2	"Doctor's Star! Rabbit Emergency Panic School!!" "Dokutā no Hoshi! Usagi Kyūkyū Panikku Sukūru!!" (Japanese: ドクターの星!ウサギ救急パニックスクール!!)	Noriyo Sasaki	Takashi Yamada	October 14, 2007
3	"Racer's Star! Scarred RC GP!!" "Rēsā no Hoshi! Dakarake no Rajikon GP!!" (Japanese: レーサーの星!傷だらけのラジコンGP!!)	Directed by : Hideki Hiroshima; Storyboarded by : Naotoshi Shida	Shōji Yonemura	October 21, 2007
4	"Pastry Stars! Futsal Reversal a la mode!!" "Patishie no Hoshi! Futtosaru Gyakuten A・Ra・Mōdo!!" (Japanese: パティシエの星!フットサル逆転ア・ラ・モード!!)	Yuriko Kado	Yuki Enatsu	October 28, 2007
5	"Star of Rescue! Baby Grand Search Line!!" "Resykyū no Hoshi! Akachan Dai Sōsa-sen!!" (Japanese: レスキューの星!赤ちゃん大捜査線!!)	Toru Yamada	Naoki Tozuka	November 4, 2007
6	"The star of the team! Escape from the trap ship!!" "Chīmu no Hoshi! Torappu-sen Kara Dasshutsu De~i!!" (Japanese: チームの星!トラップ船から脱出でぃ!!)	Yoko Ikeda	Shoji Yonemura	November 11, 2007
7	"Adventurer's Star! Survival of a Bad Dad!!" "Bōken-ka no Hoshi! Dame Papa Henjō Sabaibaru!!" (Japanese: 冒険家の星!ダメパパ返上サバイバル!!)	Directed by : Yutaka Nakashima; Storyboarded by : Satoru Iriyoshi	Shoji Yonemura	November 18, 2007
8	"Star of Spies! Find the prince of love!!" "Supai no Hoshi! Koi no Ōji-sama o Sagase!!" (Japanese: スパイの星!恋の王子様を探せ!!)	Noriyo Sasaki	Yumi Kageyama	November 25, 2007
9	"Ninja Stars! Grand Meister of the Seven Faces!!" "Ninja no Hoshi! Nanatsu no Kao no Gurando Maisutā!!" (Japanese: 忍者の星!七つの顔のグランドマイスター!!)	Directed by : Hideki Hiroshima; Storyboarded by : Tetsuo Imazawa	Takashi Yamada	December 2, 2007
10	"Ramen Stars! Tetsujin VS Gekimen Meister!!" "Rāmen no Hoshi! Tetsujin VS Gekimen Maisutā!!" (Japanese: ラーメンの星!鉄人VS激麺マイスター!!)	Masahiro Hosoda	Shoji Yonemura	December 9, 2007
11	"Hunter's Star! Chase the mysterious million-yen pet!!" "Hantā no Hoshi! Nazo no Hyaku-man en Petto o oe!!" (Japanese: ハンターの星!謎の百万円ペットを追え!!)	Directed by : Toshinori Fukazawa; Storyboarded by : Iku Ishiguro	Jin Tanaka	December 16, 2007
12	"Christmas star! Santa Claus Delivery Service!!" "X (Kurisu) Masu no Hoshi! Totsugeki Santa Takuhaibin!!" (Japanese: X (クリス)マスの星!突撃サンタ宅配便!!)	Yuriko Kado	Yuki Enatsu	December 23, 2007
13	"Playboy's star! Roses are more beautiful than sunflowers!!" "Asobinin no Hoshi! Bara wa Himawari Yori Utsukushī!!" (Japanese: 遊び人の星!バラはヒマワリより美しい!!)	Directed by : Hideki Hiroshima; Storyboarded by : Shigeharu Takahashi	Takashi Yamada	January 6, 2008
14	"Rival Stars! Formation! Joyham group?" "Raibaru no Hoshi! Kessei! Joihamu-gumi?" (Japanese: ライバルの星!結成!!ジョイハム組?)	Yoko Ikeda	Takashi Yamada	January 13, 2008
15	"Toilet Stars! Very Hard at School!!" "Toire no Hoshi! Gakkō de Dai Hādo!!" (Japanese: トイレの星!学校で大ハード!!)	Toru Yamada	Shoji Yonemura	January 20, 2008
16	"The Star of Parenting! What's a Nanny?!" "Kosodate no Hoshi! Nānī-ttena〜ni?!" (Japanese: 子育ての星!ナニーってな〜に?!)	Tetsuo Imazawa	Yumi Kageyama	January 27, 2008
17	"Stars of Ghost Hunt! A ghost story next door!!" "Gōsuto Hanto no Hoshi! Otonari no Kaidan!!" (Japanese: ゴーストハントの星!おとなりの怪談!!)	Directed by : Hideki Hiroshima; Storyboarded by : Satoru Iriyoshi	Yuki Enatsu	February 3, 2008
18	"The alleged culprit Hoshi! Alec didn't do it!" "Giwaku no Han'nin (Hoshi)! Arekku wa Yattenai!!" (Japanese: 疑惑の犯人(ホシ)!アレックはやってない!!)	Noriyo Sasaki	Isao Murayama	February 10, 2008
19	"Fortune Telling Stars! 5 Seconds Left Until Himawari Messe Explodes!!" "Uranai no Hoshi! Himawari Messe Dai Bakuha 5-byō Mae!!" (Japanese: 占いの星!ひまわりメッセ大爆破5秒前!!)	Iku Ishiguro	Takashi Yamada	February 17, 2008
20	"A Lucky Star! Hamsters will be Lucky if they Walk!!" "Omamori no Hoshi! Hamu mo Arukeba Rakkī ni Ataru!!" (Japanese: お守りの星!ハムも歩けばラッキーにあたる!!)	Yuriko Kado	Yumi Kageyama	February 24, 2008
21	"Detective Stars! Howl at Sunflowers!!" "Keiji no Hoshi! Himari ni Hoero!!" (Japanese: 刑事の星!ひまわりにほえろ!!)	Masahiro Hosoda	Shoji Yonemura	March 2, 2008
22	"Director Stars! A Superbly Shot Ham-cademy Award Winning Masterpiece!!" "Kantoku no Hoshi! Geki to Hamu Demī-shō Chōdaisaku!!" (Japanese: 監督の星!激撮ハムデミー賞超大作!!)	Yoko Ikeda	Naoki Tozuka	March 9, 2008
23	"Soccer Stars! Fierce Battle at the World Ham Cup!!" "Sakkā no Hoshi! Nettō Wārudo Hamu-Hai (Kappu)!!" (Japanese: サッカーの星!熱闘ワールドハム杯(カップ)!!)	Directed by : Hideki Hiroshima; Storyboarded by : Satoru Iriyoshi	Isao Murayama	March 16, 2008
24	"Manga Artist's Star! Space-time Ninja's Debut!!" "Manga-ka no Hoshi! Jikū Ninja Debyū!!" (Japanese: マンガ家の星!時空忍者デビュー!!)	Toru Yamada	Yumi Kageyama	March 23, 2008
25	"Speed Stars! RC Triathlon!!" "Supīdo no Hoshi! RC (Remokon) Toriasuron!!" (Japanese: スピードの星!RC (ラジコン)トライアスロン!!)	Kōnosuke Uda	Shoji Yonemura	March 30, 2008
26	"Fallen Star! Better a Player than a Worker!!" "Dakaru no Hoshi! Shigoto Hito Yori Asobinin!!" (Japanese: 堕落の星!仕事人より遊び人!!)	Noriyo Sasaki	Hiroshi Toda	April 6, 2008
27	"The Star of Destruction and Rock! The Challenge of Joyham's Four Kings!!" "Hakai to Rokku no Hoshi! Joihamu Shiten'nō no Chōsen!!" (Japanese: 破壊とロックの星!ジョイハム四天王の挑戦!!)	Directed by : Toshinori Fukazawa; Storyboarded by : Tetsuo Imazawa	Takashi Yamada	April 13, 2008
28	"Stars of the Future! We are the Apprentice Kids, The Mini-Ham Group!!" "Mirai no Hoshi! Bokura Minarai Kizzu Mini Hamu-Hamu Gumi!!" (Japanese: 未来の星!ぼくら見習いキッズミニハム組!!)	Yuriko Kado	Takashi Yamada	April 20, 2008
29	"Jealousy Star! No, No, Dancing Queen!!" "Shitto no Hoshi! Dame Dame Danshingu Kuīn!!" (Japanese: 嫉妬の星!だめだめダンシングクイーン!!)	Directed by : Hideki Hiroshima; Storyboarded by : Hidehito Ueda	Shoji Yonemura	April 27, 2008
30	"A New Star! Old Man Samba Makes Sports Pop!!" "Tanjō no Hoshi! Oyaji Sanba de Supoponpo〜n!!" (Japanese: 誕生の星!おやじサンバでスポポンポ〜ン!!)	Hiroki Shibata	Yumi Kageyama	May 4, 2008
31	"A Shining Star of Tears! A Penal Colony of Perfect Handsome Men!!" "Namida no Kirai Hoshi! Pāfekuto Ikemen no Ryūkeichi!!" (Japanese: 涙のキラリ星!パーフェクトイケメンの流刑地!!)	Koji Ogawa	Naoki Tozuka	May 11, 2008
32	"The Star of the China Expedition! Sylvie's Father is a Kung-Fu Meister!!" "Chūgoku Ensei no Hoshi! Shirubī Papa wa Kanfū Maisutā!!" (Japanese: 中国遠征の星!シルビーパパはカンフーマイスター?!)	Toru Yamada	Yoichi Takahashi	May 18, 2008
33	"The Star of the Sideways Glance! Save the Brilliant Female Impersonator!!" "Nagashime no Hoshi! Kareinaru Tensai Oyama o Sukue!!" (Japanese: 流し目の星!華麗なる天才女形を救え!!)	Noriyo Sasaki	Yumi Kageyama	May 25, 2008
34	"Boxing Stars! Show us Your Gutsy Punch!!" "Bokusā no Hoshi! Misetare! Naniwa no Dokonjō no Panchi!!" (Japanese: ボクサーの星!見せたれ!ナニワのど根性パンチ!!)	Hidehito Ueda	Shoji Yonemura	June 1, 2008
35	"The Strongest Legendary Star! Yankee Rescue VS Osu!! Special Training Leader" "Saikyō Densetsu no Hoshi! Yankī Resukyū VS Osu!! Tokkun Banchō" (Japanese: 最強伝説の星!ヤンキーレスキューVS押忍!! 特訓番長)	Masahiro Hosoda	Jin Tanaka	June 8, 2008
36	"The Star of the Secret Hot Springs! The True Identity of the Boss Floating in the Stream!!" "Hitō no Hoshi! Yukemuri ni Ukabu Motojime no Shōtai!!" (Japanese: 秘湯の星!湯けむりに浮かぶ元締めの正体!!)	Tetsuo Imazawa	Takashi Yamada	June 15, 2008
37	"Star of Transformation! The Maiham Group Makes a Shocking Debut in the Human World!!" "Henshin no Hoshi! Maihamugumi, Ningen-kai e Shōgeki Debyū!!" (Japanese: 変身の星!マイハム組、人間界へ衝撃デビュー!!)	Yoko Ikeda	Shoji Yonemura	June 22, 2008
38	"Star of Happenings! Gaudi's Mother Recommends Matchmaking!!" "Hapuningu no Hoshi! Gaudi Haha, O Miai no Susume!!" (Japanese: ハプニングの星!ガウディ母、お見合のススメ!!)	Hiroki Shibata	Yumi Kageyama	July 6, 2008
39	"Unknown Star! Hell and Paradise Time Travel!!" "Michi no Hoshi! Jigoku Gokuraku Time Toraberu!!" (Japanese: 未知の星!地獄極楽タイムトラベル!!)	Directed by : Hideki Hiroshima; Storyboarded by : Ryoji Fujiwara	Naoki Tozuka	July 13, 2008
40	"Treasure Island Star! Summer Vacation Pirates' Great Sea Battle!!" "Takarajima no Hoshi! Natsuyasumi Pairētsu Dai Kaisen!!" (Japanese: 宝島の星!夏休みパイレーツ大海戦!!)	Hidehito Ueda	Yuta Urasawa	July 20, 2008
41	"Space Travel Stars! Vegetable Planet SOS!!" "Uchū Ryokō no Hoshi! Bejitaburu Wakusei SOS!!" (Japanese: 宇宙旅行の星!ベジタブル惑星SOS!!)	Noriyo Sasaki	Yumi Kageyama	July 27, 2008
42	"Phantom Thief Star! The Paris Sports Festival is Under Attack!!" "Kaitō no Hoshi! Nerawareta Pari・Supōtsu no Saiten!!" (Japanese: 怪盗の星!狙われたパリ・スポーツの祭典!!)	Masahiro Hosoda	Isao Murayama	August 3, 2008
43	"Sushi Black Star! The Failed Meister's Final Revenge!!" "Sushi no Kuroboshi! Rakudai Maisutā Saigo no Ribenji!!" (Japanese: 寿司の黒星!落第マイスター最後のリベンジ!!)	Directed by : Koji Ogawa; Storyboarded by : Tetsuo Imazawa	Takashi Yamada	August 10, 2008
44	"Star of the Martial Arts Tournament! Who is Maiham's Strongest Champion?!" "Butō-kai no Hoshi! Maihamu Saikyō Ōja wa Dare?!" (Japanese: 武闘会の星!マイハム最強王者は誰?!)	Directed by : Hideki Hiroshima; Storyboarded by : Ken Otsuka	Shoji Yonemura	August 17, 2008
45	"The Star of the Homework Revolution! Our Parent-Child Wars!!" "Shukudai Kakumei no Hoshi! Boku-tachi no Oyaku Uōzu!!" (Japanese: 宿題革命の星!ぼくたちの親子ウォーズ!!)	Directed by : Noriyo Sasaki; Storyboarded by : Yoko Ikeda	Jin Tanaka	August 24, 2008
46	"Charity Crumbs Star! Duo Hats Prevent Eviction?!" "Charitī no Kuzu Hoshi! Duo Bōshi de Tachinoki Bōshi?!" (Japanese: チャリティーのくず星!デュオ帽子で立ち退き防止?!)	Yuriko Kado	Yumi Kageyama	August 31, 2008
47	"The Star of the Final Battle! The Four Kings' Great Counterattack!!" "Saishū Batoru no Hoshi! Ōru Shiten'nō Dai Gyakushū!!" (Japanese: 最終バトルの星!オール四天王大逆襲!!)	Hidehito Ueda	Shoji Yonemura	September 14, 2008
48	"Saviour Stars! Tokime Kids-Star Ham Group is Born" "Kyūseishu no Hoshi! Tokime Kizzu-Boshi Hamu-Gumi Tanjō" (Japanese: 救世主の星!ときめキッズ星ハム組誕生!!)	Hiroki Shibata	Shoji Yonemura	September 21, 2008
49	"Betrayal of The Parent and Child Star! Father, Are you the Enemy?" "Uragiri no Oyakoboshi! Chichiyo, Anata wa Tekina no ka?" (Japanese: 裏切りの親子星!父よ、あなたは敵なのか!?)	Hideki Hiroshima	Takashi Yamada	September 28, 2008
50	"The World is One Star! Work and Play are Eternal..." "Sekai wo Hitotsu no Hoshi! Shigoto to Asobi wa Eien ni..." (Japanese: 世界は一つの星!仕事と遊びは永遠に...)	Tetsuo Imazawa	Takashi Yamada	October 5, 2008
