= Yojibaba =

Yojibaba (Japanese: ヨジババ; lit. "4 O'clock Hag") is a type of Japanese urban legend and school ghost story. Stories about it were being told as early as the first half of the 1970s in places such as Tokyo, Osaka Prefecture, Aichi Prefecture, and Shiga Prefecture.

== Overview ==
The general synopsis of the story is as follows. It says that if one is in a specific location within a school around 4:00 PM, one will be attacked by an unidentified old woman. This old woman sometimes kidnaps children, dragging them into the fourth dimension, or taking them to a world of nothingness.

It is said that encountering the old woman results in sleep paralysis or being locked in a restroom. Some versions say she kills humans, strangling them with a red scarf or cutting them down with a sickle.

Like other ghost stories, there is a rich variety of settings. The time of appearance varies, such as "4:00 PM," "4:04 PM," "4:44:44 PM," or "April 4th at 4:44:44 PM." The name also fluctuates, written or pronounced as "Yojibabaa" (4 O'clock Hag), "Yojibaba", "4-ji Baba", "Yoji Baba", or "Yojigen Babaa" (Fourth-Dimension Hag). The location of appearance also varies considerably, such as the fourth restroom stall, a blackboard, or a bamboo grove. However, it is a ghost story transmitted across schools in various regions sharing the common elements of "4:00 PM" and an "old woman."

In some cases, motifs related to colors like "Red Paper, Blue Paper" are added. For example, if one enters the restroom at 4 o'clock, a voice asks, "Red, blue, yellow, which do you want?" Answering "red" results in being strangled by a red scarf; answering "blue" results in having one's blood drained until pale blue; and answering "yellow" allows one to survive. Some accounts say that the answer of "Yojibaba color, skin color" to the question about colors is the one to avoid being killed.

Although there are few descriptions of the old woman's appearance, accounts range from a blood-covered old woman, to one pushing a baby carriage piled with human bones, or appearing as only translucent eyes.

It has been noted that the involvement of the number "4" in the name, location, and time implies the terror of this old woman, as "4" (pronounced shi) is associated with "death" (also pronounced shi) in Japanese culture.

== Yojibaba of Joyo City ==
While the Yojibaba ghost story became popular nationwide in the early 1990s, in the vicinity of Joyo City, Kyoto Prefecture, a folklore transmitted among children has existed since relatively old times. (Note: However, for this ghost story to make sense, it requires the concept of "4:00 PM" of the modern Solar calendar.) In the precincts of Mito Shrine in Terada within the same city, a large votive tablet (ema) measuring approximately 1 meter vertically by 1.5 meters horizontally, depicting an old woman wearing worn-out clothes, is dedicated. It is said to be from the Edo period. The Yaksha or Yama-uba depicted on this votive tablet is identified as "Yojibaba," and legend has it that she kidnaps children who do not return home by 4:00 PM. In 2009, based on this legend, Yoshihisa Azuma created a puppet show titled "Kōnosu-yama no Yojibaba" (Yojibaba of Mt. Kōnosu) in collaboration with a librarian from Joyo City, which was performed at elementary schools within the city.

== Yojibaba (Pager Service) ==
In the pocket bell (pager) business of Tokyo Telemessage (first generation), there was once a content series offered to students called the Yojibaba Series. The content initially offered was titled "Yojibaba Shrine," which involved exchanging messages via pager with a fictional character named "Yojibaba" who supposedly lived in the 4th dimension. It received a certain level of acclaim from the target demographic of female middle school and high school students. The content incorporated elements of the Yojibaba ghost story at key points, such as setting the message delivery time to 4:04:04 PM.

Later, this system was expanded to distribute content such as "Yojibaba Seminar," which sent various entrance exam questions to students preparing for exams.

== See also ==
- Urban legend
- Mass panic
- Demagogue
- Elementary school
- Mass hysteria

== Bibliography ==
- Masaki Kondo, ed. (1995). Majo no Dengonban (in Japanese). Hakusuisha. ISBN 978-4-560-04048-5.
- Nihon Minwa no Kai / Gakkō no Kaidan Editorial Committee (1996). Gakkō no Kaidan Daijiten (in Japanese). Poplar Publishing. ISBN 978-4-591-04964-8.
- Poplar Publishing Editorial Department (ed.), Setsuko Watanabe (composition), ed. (1996). Eiga 'Gakkō no Kaidan' ni Yoserareta Kowai Uwasa. Gakkō no Kaidan Cinema Books (in Japanese). Poplar Publishing. ISBN 978-4-591-05146-7.
- Bintaro Yamaguchi (2007). Hontō ni Iru Nihon no "Gendai Yōkai" Zukan (in Japanese). Kasakura Publishing. ISBN 978-4-7730-0365-9.
