= Nontan to Issho: KuruKuru Puzzle =

1994 puzzle video game

- Game Boy box art
- Developer: Game Freak
- Publisher: Victor Entertainment
- Series: Nontan
- Platforms: Game Boy; Super Famicom
- Release: Game Boy: JP: April 28, 1994; Super Famicom: JP: November 25, 1994
- Genre: Puzzle

Nontan to Issho: KuruKuru Puzzle (Note: Japanese: ノンタンといっしょ くるくるパズル, Hepburn: Nontan to Issho: KuruKuru Pazuru; lit. 'Nontan and Friends: Spinning Puzzle') is a 1994 puzzle video game. It is based on an anime series Nontan to Issho. The game was developed by Game Freak. The developer said he was satisfied with the game, as he felt it superior to the company's earlier similar title Yoshi (1991).

The game was released on April 28, 1994 for the Game Boy and on November 25, 1994 for the Super Famicom in Japan. Both versions received generally low scores in Famicom Tsūshin.

== Gameplay ==
Screenshot from the Super Famicom version.

The main objective of the game is for players to flip falling tiles over and try to match two of them, which removes them from the board. There game has two modes of play: one where players aim for a high score, and another where players aim to clear all 25 levels.

== Development ==
Nontan to Issho: KuruKuru Puzzle was developed by Game Freak and based on the characters appearing in the anime series Nontan to Issho.

Satoshi Tajiri of Game Freak previously had a connection with Nintendo with their falling block puzzle game called Yoshi (1991). The developers explained in their own fanzine titled Video Game Freak that they were pleased with Nontan to Issho: KuruKuru Puzzle as it let them overcome what they perceived as design problems with Yoshi.

== Release and reception ==
Reception

Review score
Publication	Score
Famitsu	5/10, 5/10, 6/10, 4/10 (GB); 6/10, 6/10, 6/10, 5/10 (SFC)

Nontan to Issho: KuruKuru Puzzle was released in Japan for the Game Boy on April 28 and for the Super Famicom on November 25, 1994. It was published by Victor Entertainment.
