= Poplar Publishing =

Japanese publisher

Poplar Publishing Co., LTD. (株式会社ポプラ社, Popurasha) is a Japanese publishing house founded in 1947 that publishes books, magazines and manga for Japanese children, the most famous of which is Pre Comic Bunbun. In 2004 it acquired control of the rival Jive.

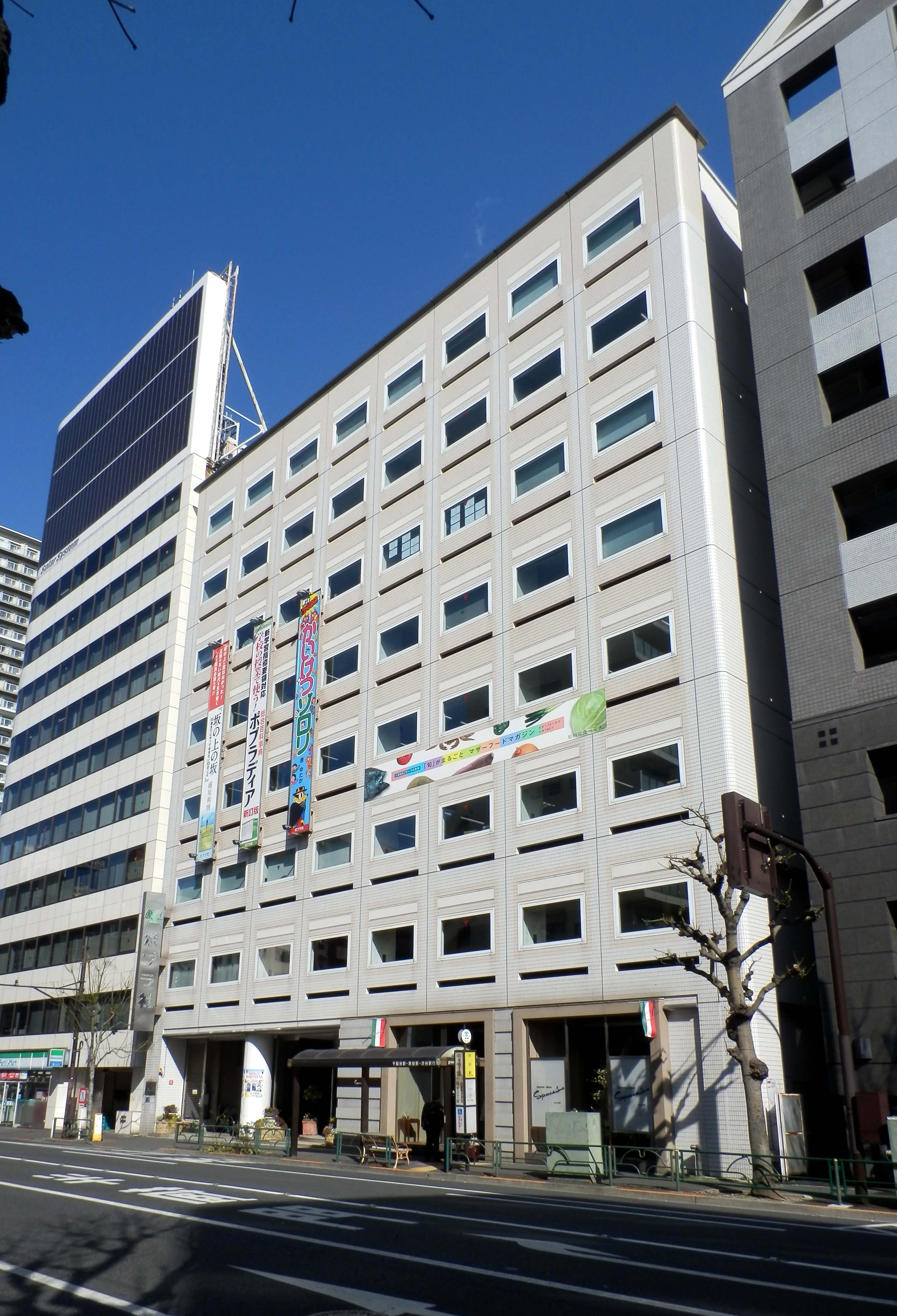
Poplar Publishing headquarters, Shinjuku, Tokyo

Some of the children's books published by Poplar are Yutaka Hara's Kaiketsu Zorori , Masamoto Nasu's Zukokke Sannin-gumi (The funny trio) and Troll's Oshiri Tantei (Butt Detective) series, as well as non-fiction books such as the children's encyclopedia Poplardia. It also publishes the Japanese language editions of Rev W. Audry's The Railway Series and Jeff Kinney's Diary of a Wimpy Kid.

== Poplar Grand Prize ==
Every year since 2005, Poplar holds the Poplar Grand Prize for Fiction (ポプラ社小説大賞 Popura Shosetsu Taishō), a contest held for new stories and novels that are created during the year. The prize for the first place winner is 20 million yen.
