= Kaiketsu Zorori =

Japanese children's book series

- Zorori fighting a dragon to rescue Princess Elzie. Arthur is on the bottom left.

かいけつゾロリ
- Novel series
- Written by: Yutaka Hara
- Published by: Poplar Publishing
- Original run: November 1987 – present
- Volumes: 77
- Original video animation
- Music by: Yutaka Hara
- Released: November 28, 1989
- Runtime: 15 minutes
- Episodes: 3
- Anime film

Kaiketsu Zorori: Mahōtsukai no Deshi / Daikaizoku no Takara Sagashi
- Directed by: Yoshio Takeuchi
- Produced by: Hibiki Ito
- Music by: Yo Tsuji
- Studio: Tokyo Movie Shinsha
- Released: July 17, 1993
- Runtime: 28 minutes
- Manga
- Written by: Yutaka Hara
- Illustrated by: Hiroki Kimura
- Published by: Poplar Publishing
- Magazine: Comic BunBun
- Original run: 2004 – 2009
- Volumes: 10
- Anime television series
- Directed by: Hiroshi Nishikiori; Tetsuo Miura (assistant)
- Produced by: Takashi Imai; Atsushi Hayashi; Masatoshi Fujii; Tokiko Ohara
- Written by: Mayori Sekijima; Hiroshi Nishikiori; Kazuhiko Ikeguchi
- Music by: Kōhei Tanaka
- Studio: Amber Film Works; Ajiado
- Original network: ANN (Nagoya TV, TV Asahi)
- English network: PH: Cartoon Network
- Original run: February 1, 2004 – February 6, 2005
- Episodes: 52
- Anime television series

Majime ni Fumajime Kaiketsu Zorori
- Directed by: Tsutomu Shibayama (chief)
- Written by: Hiro Masaki (1-50); Takeshi Mori (50-97)
- Music by: Kōhei Tanaka
- Studio: Sunrise; Ajiado
- Original network: ANN (Nagoya TV, TV Asahi)
- English network: IN: Cartoon Network; PH: Cartoon Network
- Original run: February 13, 2005 – January 28, 2007
- Episodes: 97
- Anime television series

Motto! Majime ni Fumajime Kaiketsu Zorori
- Directed by: Takahide Ogata
- Written by: Atsuhiro Tomioka
- Music by: Kōhei Tanaka
- Studio: BN Pictures; Ajiado
- Original network: NHK E
- Original run: April 5, 2020 – September 21, 2022
- Episodes: 75
- Anime film

Majime ni Fumajime Kaiketsu Zorori: Nazo no Otakara Daisakusen
- Directed by: Hajime Kamegaki
- Written by: Mari Okada
- Music by: Kōhei Tanaka
- Studio: Sunrise; Ajiado
- Released: March 11, 2006
- Runtime: 53 minutes
- Anime film

Kaiketsu Zorori: Da-da-da-daibōken!
- Directed by: Tomoko Iwasaki
- Written by: Takeshi Mori
- Music by: Kōhei Tanaka
- Studio: Sunrise; Ajiado
- Released: December 22, 2012
- Runtime: 82 minutes
- Anime film

Kaiketsu Zorori: Mamoru ze! Kyōryū no Tamago
- Directed by: Tomoko Iwasaki
- Written by: Takeshi Mori
- Music by: Kōhei Tanaka
- Studio: Sunrise; Ajiado
- Released: December 14, 2013
- Runtime: 77 minutes
- Anime film

Kaiketsu Zorori: Uchū no Yūsha-tachi
- Directed by: Tomoko Iwasaki
- Written by: Mari Okada; Akiko Waba; Keigo Koyanagi
- Music by: Kōhei Tanaka
- Studio: BN Pictures; Ajiado
- Released: September 12, 2015
- Runtime: 49 minutes
- Anime film

Kaiketsu Zorori: ZZ no Himitsu
- Directed by: Masaya Fujimori
- Written by: Reiko Yoshida
- Music by: Kōhei Tanaka
- Studio: BN Pictures; Ajiado
- Released: November 22, 2017
- Runtime: 70 minutes
- Anime film

Kaiketsu Zorori: La La La Sutā Tanjō
- Directed by: Takahide Ogata
- Written by: Atsuhiro Tomioka
- Music by: Kōhei Tanaka
- Studio: BN Pictures; Ajiado
- Released: December 9, 2022
- Runtime: 70 minutes

Kaiketsu Zorori (Japanese: かいけつゾロリ; lit. 'Incredible Zorori') is a Japanese children's book series created by Yutaka Hara and published by Poplar Publishing. The original books were also made into an OVA, animated feature-length films, anime, and comics.

== Synopsis ==
Set in a parallel world inhabited by anthropomorphic animals (in their Earth's version of Japan), the story follows the protagonist, a fox named Zorori and his twin boar bandit apprentices Ishishi and Noshishi as they travel from place to place. The series debuted in 1987 with its first issue: The Incredible Zorori, Dragon Slayer (かいけつゾロリのドラゴンたいじ) and has published about two issues per year, totaling 70 issues as of December 2021. It was adapted into an anime series from February 1, 2004, to January 28, 2007. A Hong Kong produced English dubbed version by Red Angel Media aired on Cartoon Network Philippines on January 4, 2010.

Zorori was originally a villain for the series Spinach Man (ほうれんそうマン) written by Shiho Mitsushima, and when Hōrensō Man ended, Shiho Mitsushima understood the need to give it an independent spin-off. What both series shared in common was that the end of Spinach Man and the Haunted Castle (ほうれんそうマンのゆうれいじょう) (depicts Zorori leaving on a journey to get a castle) ties in with the beginning of Kaiketsu Zorori no Doragon Taiji and Zorori's aspiration, "Zorori Castle Part 2" is established (It appears Part 1 came from the Zorori Castle in Hōrensō Man no Yūreijō). Another part is the reoccurring characters (Zorori Mama and Yōkai Gakkō no Sensei, and to some degree the debut of Sumire and Bokushi Robo) that were not given anything past trivial appearances. However, knowing the background story of the Hōrensō Man series is not needed to be able to enjoy the Zorori series.

Using clear patterns and lines, the characters would speak using speech bubbles more similar to comics than to picture books. The text and words would not use any difficult kanji or any furigana, instead using lower grade level words so that it can be read alone without needing any help. It also features excessive puns and it is because of this that puns saw a boom in use in elementary school students. In spite of it being called a well read elementary school "children's book", it has an array of farting, belching, and vulgar words that sometimes parents and guardians in the PTA demanded apologies for it. Whenever Zorori is in a desperate situation and it appears he'll reach his demise, a fake notice is posted advising to skip the next page due to gruesome violence (Of course this is all a joke. The next page just has him finding a way out of his predicament).

Furthermore, the Spanish word for fox is "zorro", and the author intended for Kaiketsu Zorori to resemble Zorro.

== List of volumes ==
The first Zorori book was released in November 1987 and has seen two releases per year since. This was later changed to an annual release after volume 74, in December 2023. The first 39 volumes had been used as source material for the anime, while volumes 40 and beyond are book only, due to being printed after the anime's cancellation. Some of the later volumes were then used as source material for a new anime, which aired between April 2020 and September 2022.

No.	Title	Release date	ISBN
01	"Kaiketsu Zorori, the Dragon Slayer" (かいけつゾロリのドラゴンたいじ, "Kaiketsu Zorori no Doragon Taiji")	November 1987	978-4-591-02654-0
02	"Kaiketsu Zorori and the Terrifying Mansion" (かいけつゾロリのきょうふのやかた, "Kaiketsu Zorori no Kyōfu no Yakata")	May 1988	978-4-591-03001-1
03	"Kaiketsu Zorori and the Wizard's Apprentice" (かいけつゾロリのまほうつかいのでし, "Kaiketsu Zorori no Mahōtsukai no Deshi")	November 1988	978-4-591-03005-9
04	"Kaiketsu Zorori and the Great Pirates" (かいけつゾロリの大かいぞく, "Kaiketsu Zorori no Daikaizoku")	May 1989	978-4-591-03015-8
05	"Kaiketsu Zorori and the Ghost Ship" (かいけつゾロリのゆうれいせん, "Kaiketsu Zorori no Yūreisen")	October 1989	978-4-591-03024-0
06	"Kaiketsu Zorori and the Chocolate Castle" (かいけつゾロリのチョコレートじょう, "Kaiketsu Zorori no Chokorētojō")	February 1990	978-4-591-03028-8
07	"Kaiketsu Zorori and the Giant Dinosaur" (かいけつゾロリの大きょうりゅう, "Kaiketsu Zorori no Daikyōryū")	August 1990	978-4-591-03035-6
08	"Kaiketsu Zorori and the Terrifying Amusement Park" (かいけつゾロリのきょうふのゆうえんち, "Kaiketsu Zorori no Kyōfu no Yūenchi")	February 1991	978-4-591-03043-1
09	"Kaiketsu Zorori, I Love Mama" (かいけつゾロリのママだーいすき, "Kaiketsu Zorori no Mama Dāisuki")	August 1991	978-4-591-03052-3
10	"Kaiketsu Zorori and the Giant Monster" (かいけつゾロリの大かいじゅう, "Kaiketsu Zorori no Daikaijū")	January 1992	978-4-591-03058-5
11	"Kaiketsu Zorori and the Mysterious Aliens" (かいけつゾロリのなぞのうちゅうじん, "Kaiketsu Zorori no Nazo no Uchūjin")	July 1992	978-4-591-03066-0
12	"Kaiketsu Zorori and the Terrifying Presents" (かいけつゾロリのきょうふのプレゼント, "Kaiketsu Zorori no Kyōfu no Purezento")	December 1992	978-4-591-03075-2
13	"Kaiketsu Zorori and the Great Riddle Plan" (かいけつゾロリのなぞなぞ大さくせん, "Kaiketsu Zorori no Nazo Nazo Daisakusen")	June 1993	978-4-591-03086-8
14	"Kaiketsu Zorori and the Terrifying Soccer" (かいけつゾロリのきょうふのサッカー, "Kaiketsu Zorori no Kyōfu no Sakkā")	December 1993	978-4-591-03095-0
15	"Kaiketsu Zorori Arrested!!" (かいけつゾロリつかまる！！, "Kaiketsu Zorori Tsukamaru!!")	July 1994	978-4-591-04400-1
16	"Kaiketsu Zorori and the Mysterious Airplane" (かいけつゾロリとなぞのひこうき, "Kaiketsu Zorori to Nazo no Hikōki")	November 1994	978-4-591-04623-4
17	"Kaiketsu Zorori and the Great Ghost Plan" (かいけつゾロリのおばけ大さくせん, "Kaiketsu Zorori no Obake Daisakusen")	June 1995	978-4-591-04801-6
18	"Kaiketsu Zorori and the Great Ninja Plan" (かいけつゾロリのにんじゃ大さくせん, "Kaiketsu Zorori no Ninja Daisakusen")	December 1995	978-4-591-04898-6
19	"Kaiketsu Zorori Marries!?" (かいけつゾロリけっこんする！？, "Kaiketsu Zorori Kekkon Suru!?")	July 1996	978-4-591-05132-0
20	"Kaiketsu Zorori, Great Duel! Zorori Castle" (かいけつゾロリ 大けっとう！ゾロリじょう, "Kaiketsu Zorori Daikettō! Zororijō")	December 1996	978-4-591-05232-7
21	"Kaiketsu Zorori and the Terrifying Car Race" (かいけつゾロリのきょうふのカーレース, "Kaiketsu Zorori no Kyōfu no Kārēsu")	July 1997	978-4-591-05433-8
22	"Kaiketsu Zorori and the Great Terrifying Jump" (かいけつゾロリのきょうふの大ジャンプ, "Kaiketsu Zorori no "Kyōfu no Dai Janpu")	December 1997	978-4-591-05521-2
23	"Kaiketsu Zorori, a Rich Man" (かいけつゾロリの大金もち, "Kaiketsu Zorori no Oganemochi")	July 1998	978-4-591-05743-8
24	"Kaiketsu Zorori and the Close Call Video Game" (かいけつゾロリのテレビゲームききいっぱつ, "Kaiketsu Zorori no Terebi Gēmu Kikiippatsu")	December 1998	978-4-591-05881-7
25	"Kaiketsu Zorori and the Terrifying Treasure Hunt" (かいけつゾロリのきょうふの宝さがし, "Kaiketsu Zorori no Kyōfu no Takara Sagashi")	July 1999	978-4-591-06133-6
26	"Kaiketsu Zorori, the Earth's Final Day" (かいけつゾロリ ちきゅうさいごの日, "Kaiketsu Zorori Chikyū Saigo no Hi")	December 1999	978-4-591-06235-7
27	"Kaiketsu Zorori, the Detective Has Appeared" (かいけつゾロリのめいたんていとうじょう, "Kaiketsu Zorori no Meitantei Tōjō")	July 2000	978-4-591-06503-7
28	"Kaiketsu Zorori, Certain Death" (かいけつゾロリぜったいぜつめい, "Kaiketsu Zorori Zettai Zetsumei")	December 2000	978-4-591-06641-6
29	"Kaiketsu Zorori and the Terrifying Carnival" (かいけつゾロリのきょうふのカーニバル, "Kaiketsu Zorori no Kyōfu no Kānibaru")	July 2001	978-4-591-06891-5
30	"Kaiketsu Zorori, It's Hot! A Ramen Showdown" (かいけつゾロリ あついぜ！ラーメンたいけつ, "Kaiketsu Zorori Atsui ze! Rāmen Taiketsu")	December 2001	978-4-591-07045-1
31	"Kaiketsu Zorori, Heaven and Hell" (かいけつゾロリのてんごくとじごく, "Kaiketsu Zorori no Tengoku to Jigoku")	July 2002	978-4-591-07308-7
32	"Kaiketsu Zorori, a Trip to Hell" (かいけつゾロリのじごくりょこう, "Kaiketsu Zorori no Jigoku Ryokō")	December 2002	978-4-591-07446-6
33	"Kaiketsu Zorori and the Monster Major Leagues" (かいけつゾロリのようかい大リーグ, "Kaiketsu Zorori no Yōkai Dai Rīgu")	July 2003	978-4-591-07774-0
34	"Kaiketsu Zorori and the Mysterious Magical Girl" (かいけつゾロリとなぞのまほう少女, "Kaiketsu Zorori to Nazo no Mahōshōjo")	November 2003	978-4-591-07928-7
35	"Kaiketsu Zorori and the Magic Room" (かいけつゾロリとまほうのへや, "Kaiketsu Zorori to Mahō no Heya")	July 2004	978-4-591-08191-4
36	"Kaiketsu Zorori Can Be Eaten!!" (かいけつゾロリたべられる！！, "Kaiketsu Zorori Taberareru!!")	December 2004	978-4-591-08365-9
37	"Kaiketsu Zorori and the Great Thief" (かいけつゾロリの大どろぼう, "Kaiketsu Zorori no Ōdorobō")	July 2005	978-4-591-08734-3
38	"Kaiketsu Zorori and the Great Mysterious Treasure Plan First Part" (かいけつゾロリのなぞのおたから大さくせん 前編, "Kaiketsu Zorori no Nazo no Otakara Daisakusen Zenpen")	December 2005	978-4-591-08975-0
39	"Kaiketsu Zorori and the Great Mysterious Treasure Plan Later Part" (かいけつゾロリのなぞのおたから大さくせん 後編, "Kaiketsu Zorori no Nazo no Otakara Daisakusen Kōhen")	March 2006	978-4-591-09184-5
40	"Kaiketsu Zorori Will Protect It! The Dinosaur Egg" (かいけつゾロリ まもるぜ！きょうりゅうのたまご, "Kaiketsu Zorori Mamoru ze! Kyōryū no Tamago")	December 2006	978-4-591-09512-6
41	"Kaiketsu Zorori, Eat! Glutton Champion" (かいけつゾロリ たべるぜ！大ぐいせんしゅけん, "Kaiketsu Zorori Taberu ze! Ōgui Senshuken")	July 2007	978-4-591-09836-3
42	"Kaiketsu Zorori, Lose Weight! The Great Diet Plan" (かいけつゾロリ やせるぜ！ダイエット大さくせん, "Kaiketsu Zorori Yaseru ze! Daietto Daisakusen")	December 2007	978-4-591-10014-1
43	"Kaiketsu Zorori, Curry VS ESP" (かいけつゾロリ カレーVS．ちょうのうりょく, "Kaiketsu Zorori Karē VS. Chōnōryoku")	June 2008	978-4-591-10396-8
44	"Kaiketsu Zorori, Ishishi and Noshishi Are in a Big Pinch!!" (かいけつゾロリ イシシ・ノシシ大ピンチ！！, "Kaiketsu Zorori Ishishi, Noshishi Dai Pinchi!!")	December 2008	978-4-591-10687-7
45	"Kaiketsu Zorori, the Terrifying Super Express" (かいけつゾロリ きょうふのちょうとっきゅう, "Kaiketsu Zorori Kyōfu no Chōtokkyū")	July 2009	978-4-591-11059-1
46	"Kaiketsu Zorori, the Terrifying Monster Field Trip" (かいけつゾロリ きょうふのようかいえんそく, "Kaiketsu Zorori Kyōfu no Yōkai Ensoku")	December 2009	978-4-591-11273-1
47	"Kaiketsu Zorori's G-g-g-great Adventure! First Part" (かいけつゾロリのだ・だ・だ・だいぼうけん！前編, "Kaiketsu Zorori no Da-da-da-daibōken! Zenpen")	July 2010	978-4-591-11951-8
48	"Kaiketsu Zorori's G-g-g-great Adventure! Later Part" (かいけつゾロリのだ・だ・だ・だいぼうけん！後編, "Kaiketsu Zorori no Da-da-da-daibōken! Kōhen")	December 2010	978-4-591-12200-6
49	"Kaiketsu Zorori and the Nonsense TV Channel" (かいけつゾロリのはちゃめちゃテレビ局, "Kaiketsu Zorori no Hachamecha Terebi Kyoku")	July 2011	978-4-591-12507-6
50	"Kaiketsu Zorori, The Grooms-bride and Zorori Castle" (かいけつゾロリ はなよめとゾロリじょう, "Kaiketsu Zorori Hanayome to Zororijō")	December 2011	978-4-591-12682-0
51	"Kaiketsu Zorori and the Great Mecha Mecha Plan" (かいけつゾロリのメカメカ大さくせん, "Kaiketsu Zorori no Meka Meka Daisakusen")	July 2012	978-4-591-12996-8
52	"Kaiketsu Zorori, The Mysterious Spy and Chocolate" (かいけつゾロリ なぞのスパイとチョコレート, "Kaiketsu Zorori Nazo no Supai to Chokorēto")	December 2012	978-4-591-13169-5
53	"Kaiketsu Zorori, The Mysterious Spy and 100 Roses" (かいけつゾロリ なぞのスパイと100本のバラ, "Kaiketsu Zorori Nazo no Supai to 100-pon no Bara")	July 2013	978-4-591-13512-9
54	"Kaiketsu Zorori and the Magic Lamp" (かいけつゾロリのまほうのランプ～ッ, "Kaiketsu Zorori no Mahō no Ranpu")	December 2013	978-4-591-13691-1
55	"Kaiketsu Zorori, Find the Great Genie!!" (かいけつゾロリの大まじんをさがせ！！, "Kaiketsu Zorori no Daimajin o Sagase!!")	July 2014	978-4-591-14057-4
56	"Kaiketsu Zorori in The Quiz King" (かいけつゾロリのクイズ王, "Kaiketsu Zorori no Kuizu Ō")	December 2014	978-4-591-14233-2
57	"Kaiketsu Zorori and the Monster Athletics Festival" (かいけつゾロリのようかい大うんどうかい, "Kaiketsu Zorori no Yōkai Daiundōkai")	July 2015	978-4-591-14583-8
58	"Disappeared!? Kaiketsu Zorori" (きえた！？かいけつゾロリ, "Kieta!? Kaiketsu Zorori")	December 2015	978-4-591-14753-5
59	"Kaiketsu Zorori and the Delicious Gold Medal" (かいけつゾロリのおいしい金メダル, "Kaiketsu Zorori no Oishii Kin Medaru")	July 2016	978-4-591-15068-9
60	"Kaiketsu Zorori, How to Become a Prince" (かいけつゾロリの王子さまになるほうほう, "Kaiketsu Zorori no Ōjisama ni Naru Hōhō")	December 2016	978-4-591-15261-4
61	"Kaiketsu Zorori and the Deep Sea Adventure" (かいけつゾロリのかいていたんけん, "Kaiketsu Zorori no Kaitei Tanken")	July 2017	978-4-591-15492-2
62	"Kaiketsu Zorori and the Journey to the Center of the Earth" (かいけつゾロリのちていたんけん, "Kaiketsu Zorori no Chitei Tanken")	November 2017	978-4-591-15619-3
63	"Kaiketsu Zorori, the Dragon Slayer 2" (かいけつゾロリのドラゴンたいじ2, "Kaiketsu Zorori no Doragon Taiji 2")	July 2018	978-4-591-15916-3
64	"Kaiketsu Zorori, the Great Robot Plan" (かいけつゾロリ ロボット大さくせん, "Kaiketsu Zorori Robotto Daisakusen")	December 2018	978-4-591-16069-5
65	"Kaiketsu Zorori, the Great Outer Space Plan" (かいけつゾロリ うちゅう大さくせん, "Kaiketsu Zorori Uchū Daisakusen")	July 2019	978-4-591-16325-2
66	"Kaiketsu Zorori, a Star is Born" (かいけつゾロリ スターたんじょう, "Kaiketsu Zorori Sutā Tanjō")	December 2019	978-4-591-16462-4
67	"Kaiketsu Zorori, Find the Red Diamond!!" (かいけつゾロリのレッドダイヤをさがせ！！, "Kaiketsu Zorori no Reddo Daiya o Sagase!!")	June 2020	978-4-591-16683-3
68	"Kaiketsu Zorori and the Terrifying Aliens" (かいけつゾロリきょうふのエイリアン, "Kaiketsu Zorori Kyōfu no Eirian")	December 2020	978-4-591-16849-3
69	"Kaiketsu Zorori and the Frightening Monster Festival" (かいけつゾロリのゾワゾワゾクゾクようかいまつり, "Kaiketsu Zorori no Zowa Zowa Zoku Zoku Yōkai Matsuri")	July 2021	978-4-591-17053-3
70	"Kaiketsu Zorori and the Terrifying Dungeon" (かいけつゾロリ きょうふのダンジョン, "Kaiketsu Zorori Kyōfu no Danjon")	December 2021	978-4-591-17215-5
71	"Kaiketsu Zorori, the Ninja Ghost Appears!" (かいけつゾロリ にんじゃおばけあらわる！, "Kaiketsu Zorori Ninja Obake Arawaru!")	July 2022	978-4-591-17446-3
72	"Kaiketsu Zorori, Rescue Dinosaur Mama!" (かいけつゾロリ きょうりゅうママをすくえ！, "Kaiketsu Zorori Kyōryū Mama o Sukue!")	December 2022	978-4-591-17568-2
73	"Kaiketsu Zorori, Suddenly Becoming a King?" (かいけつゾロリ いきなり王さまになる？, "Kaiketsu Zorori Ikinari Ōsama ni Naru?")	July 2023	978-4-591-17843-0
74	"Kaiketsu Zorori, Noshishi Suddenly Becomes a King!" (かいけつゾロリ ノシシいきなり王さまになる！, "Kaiketsu Zorori Noshishi Ikinari Ōsama ni Naru!")	December 2023	978-4-591-18005-1
75	"Kaiketsu Zorori, Bon Appetit!! Mysterious Huge Diamonds" (かいけつゾロリ いただき！！なぞのどデカダイアモンド, "Kaiketsu Zorori Itadaki!! Nazo no Dodeka Daiamondo")	December 2024	978-4-591-18404-2
76	"Kaiketsu Zorori, A Fake Zorori Appears!!" (かいけつゾロリ ニセゾロリあらわる！！, "Kaiketsu Zorori Nisezorori Arawaru!!")	December 2025	978-4-591-18808-8
77	"Kaiketsu Zorori, Who's the Culprit!!" (かいけつゾロリ はんにんはだれだ！！, "Kaiketsu Zorori Hannin wa Dare da!!")	December 2026	978-4-591-19190-3

== Manga ==
BunBun Comics published 10 volumes of a manga series featuring Kaiketsu Zorori in famous fairy tales and folk tales. It was written by Yutaka Hara and illustrated by Hiroki Kimura.

No.	Title	Release date	ISBN
01	"Zorori in Urashima Taro" (ゾロリのうらしま太郎, "Zorori no Urashima Tarō")	September 2004	978-4-591-08264-5
02	"Zorori in Momotaro" (ゾロリのもも太郎, "Zorori no Momotarō")	March 2005	978-4-591-08557-8
03	"Zorori in Snow White" (ゾロリの白雪姫, "Zorori no Shirayuki-hime")	September 2005	978-4-591-08644-5
04	"Zorori in Princess Kaguya" (ゾロリのかぐや姫, "Zorori no Kaguya-hime")	March 2006	978-4-591-09010-7
05	"Zorori in Little Red Riding Hood" (ゾロリの赤ずきん, "Zorori no Akazukin")	September 2006	978-4-591-09430-3
06	"Zorori in The Rolling Rice Ball" (ゾロリのおむすびころりん, "Zorori no Omusubi Kororin")	March 2007	978-4-591-09738-0
07	"Kaiketsu Zorori in The Emperor's New Clothes" (かいけつゾロリのはだかの王さま, "Kaiketsu Zorori no Hadaka no Ōsama")	December 2007	978-4-591-10031-8
08	"Kaiketsu Zorori in Aladdin and the Wonderful Lamp" (かいけつゾロリのアラジンと魔法のランプ, "Kaiketsu Zorori no Arajin to Mahō no Ranpu")	July 2008	978-4-591-10421-7
09	"Kaiketsu Zorori in Jack and the Beanstalk" (かいけつゾロリのジャックと豆の木, "Kaiketsu Zorori no Jakku to Mame no Ki")	December 2008	978-4-591-10625-9
10	"Kaiketsu Zorori in The Sleeping Beauty" (かいけつゾロリの眠りの森の姫, "Kaiketsu Zorori no Nemuri no Mori no Hime")	June 2009	978-4-591-11027-0

== Theme Songs ==
=== Kaiketsu Zorori ===
Opening Theme

- "Hassuru" (ハッスル; 'Hustle') by Kōichi Yamadera

Ending Themes

- "Sora wa Ao" (空は青; 'The Sky is Blue') by Satō-san and Suzuki-kun (Little by Little) (ep. 1~13)
- "Owari no Uta" (おわりのうた; 'Ending Song') by Yukie 6 & Nobita Robert (ep. 14~31)
- "Akaneiro" (あかねいろ; 'Crimson') by Satō-san and Suzuki-kun (Little by Little) (ep. 32~46)
- "Gayōshi" (画用紙; 'Drawing Paper') by Sayuri Anzu (ep. 47~52)

=== Majime ni Fumajime Kaiketsu Zorori ===
Opening Themes

- "A Ja Paa" (あじゃぱー) by Kōichi Yamadera, Rikako Aikawa, and Motoko Kumai (ep. 1~50)
- "Zekkōchō!" (ゼッコーチョー!; 'In Perfect Form!') by Kōichi Yamadera (ep. 51~97)

Ending Themes

- "Mama no Komoriuta" (ママの子守唄; 'Mama's Lullaby') by Sakiko Tamagawa (ep. 1~27)
- "Atcha Kotcha Gō!" (あっちゃこっちゃゴー!; 'Atcha Kotcha GO!') by Junko Iwao (ep. 28~50)
- "Ishi Noshi Kazoe Uta desu ka!!" (イシノシかぞえうたでスカ!!; 'Ishishi & Noshishi's Counting Song!!') by Rikako Aikawa and Motoko Kumai (ep. 51~74)
- "Buwātto ikō ze" (ブワーッといこうぜ; 'Whoosh, Let's Go') by Kōichi Yamadera (ep. 75~97)

=== Motto! Majime ni Fumajime Kaiketsu Zorori ===
Opening Theme

- "Motto! Motto! Kaiketsu Zorori" (もっと!もっと!かいけつゾロリ; 'More! More! Kaiketsu Zorori') by Kōichi Yamadera (ep. 1~50)
- "Dai Gyakuten Dokkoi SHOW" (大逆転どっこいSHOW; 'The Great Turnaround Heave-ho SHOW') by Kōichi Yamadera (ep. 51~75)

Ending Themes

- "Shalalala" (シャラララ) by ONEPIXCEL (ep. 1~25)
- "ZORORI ROCK!!!" by Yabai T-shirts Yasan (ep. 26~75)
