= Sachiko Kiyono =

Japanese picture book author (1947–2008)

Sachiko Kiyono (Japanese: キヨノサチコ, Hepburn: Kiyono Sachiko, born Sachiko Seino, 1947 – 19 June 2008) was a Japanese picture book author. She is best known as the creator of Nontan.

== Biography ==
Kiyono was born Sachiko Seino (清野 幸子, Seino Sachiko) in 1947. In 1976, Kiyono made her debut with Nontan Buranko Nosete (ノンタンぶらんこのせて; lit. Nontan, Let Me Use the Swing); the Nontan series went on to publish 40 volumes and 28 million copies. She married Yasuomi Ōtomo, who also worked on the Nontan series. However, they divorced and subsequently had a lawsuit over the copyright distribution of Nontan; it was decided that Kiyono was the main author and Ōtomo only supported her. Ōtomo died during the trial, and though his successor appealed, it was dismissed. Kiyono lived in Hawaii before returning to Japan to be hospitalized. She died from a brain tumor on 19 June 2008; a funeral was held with relatives. However, her death was reported in December, as she reportedly told her family and editor to hide the news of her death, saying, "Even if I'm gone, Nontan will continue to live in good health."
