= The Art of Mathematics =

Korean textbook series

- Author: Hong Sung-Dae
- Original title: 수학의 정석
- Language: Korean
- Genre: Mathematics
- Publication date: 1966
- Publication place: South Korea

The Art of Mathematics (Korean: 수학의 정석; RR: suhak-ui jeongseok), written by Hong Sung-Dae, is a series of mathematics textbooks for high school students in South Korea. First published in 1966, it is the best-selling book series in South Korea, with about 46 million copies sold as of 2016. In Jeongeup, North Jeolla Province, the hometown of Hong Sung-Dae, a street is named Suhakjeongseok-gil (Korean: 수학정석길) in honor of the author.'

== Controversy ==
The similarities with the Japanese Textbook series Chart-Style Math (Japanese: チャート式数学) have caused the author to receive accusations of plagiarism. The chapter division, style of explanation, and formatting are visibly similar between the books. For instance, in the Japanese books, the order of questions are in "Example Questions, Practice Questions, Exercise Questions," while in The Art of Mathematics it is "Example Questions, Similar Questions, Practice Questions". The author Hong has denied all accusations, although he has admitted that the questions in the books were selected from 20 reference books around the world.

== Major topics in the 11th edition ==
Changes in the 11th edition, published 2013–2015, reflect the 2009 revision of South Korea's National Curriculum. Each of the six volumes consist of two versions, one for average students (기본편; Gibonpyeon) and one for higher-ability students (실력편; Silyeokpyeon).

=== Mathematics I ===
수학 I

- Polynomials (다항식)
- Equations and Inequalities (방정식과 부등식)
- Graphs of Equations (방정식의 그래프)

=== Mathematics II ===
수학 II

- Sets and Propositions (집합과 명제)
- Functions (함수 ham-soo)
- Sequences (수열 soo-yeul)
- Exponents and Logarithms (지수와 로그함수)

=== Probability and statistics ===
확률과 통계

- Permutations and Combinations (순열과 조합)
- Probability (확률)
- Statistics (통계)

=== Calculus I ===
미적분 I

- Limits of Sequences (수열의 극한)
- Limits and Continuity (극한과 연속성)
- Differentiation of Polynomial Functions (다항식의 미분)
- Integration of Polynomial Functions (다항식의 적분)

=== Calculus II ===
미적분 II

- Exponential and Logarithmic Functions (지수와 로그 함수)
- Trigonometric Functions (삼각함수)
- Differentiation (미분)
- Integration (적분)

=== Geometry and Vectors ===
기하와 벡터

- Plane Curves (평면곡선)
- Vectors in the Plane (평면 벡터)
- Graphs and Vectors in Space (공간의 그래프와 벡터)
