= Nontan =

Japanese children's picture books

- Cover of Nontan Buranko no Sete.
- Author: Sachiko Kiyono
- Language: Japanese
- Genre: Children's book
- Published: 1976
- Publication place: Japan

Nontan (Note: Japanese: ノンタン) is the protagonist of an eponymous series of children's picture books written by Sachiko Kiyono (キヨノサチコ). Books from the series have been translated into French and Chinese and adapted into an anime series in 1992 (where his voice was provided by Chiaki Fujimoto and Ayaka Saitō). As of December 2020, over 33.6 million copies of the Nontan books have been sold.

In the series, Nontan is a mischievous male kitten who likes to play and learn about the world around him. Other characters include Buta-san, the rabbit triplets, Tanuki-san, Kuma-san, Hachi-san, and Nontan's little sister Tartan. When the series first appeared, it was criticized for lacking clear lessons, with some fearing it would promote bad behaviour thus leading the character being a poor role model to children, According to the psychologist Takashi Tomita (富田たかし), this is due to the fact that Nontan had some bad traits and occasionally failed that children were able to feel close to him. The series has been used to prepare children for surgery, and analyzed in academic articles.

Kiyono died of a brain tumor on 19 June 2008 at age 60, but her death was not announced until December of that year.

== History ==
The series debuted in August 1976 with Nontan Buranko Nosete (Note: Japanese: ノンタンぶらんこのせて; lit. Nontan, Let Me Use the Swing). Since then, it has gained popularity not only for their picture books, but also for CDs, anime, CGI animation, and its licensed products.

Originally, Kiyono and Yasuomi Ōtomo wanted the book to star a fox, and the book would be titled Akanbe Kitsune (あかんべきつね), with a white fox as its character. After that, the character was changed to a cat and the book was renamed to Akanbe Dora-kun (あかんべどらくん). However, the word "Dora-kun" was difficult for children to pronounce, so the character was renamed to Nontan, which was the name of Kiyono's daughter.

The first published Nontan books are Nontan Buranko no Sete, and Akanbe Nontan (Note: Japanese: あかんべノンタン; lit. Tongue-sticking Nontan). Due to the situation of picture books in 1976, the author feared that the mischievous acts of Akanbe Nontan would be rejected by mothers who purchased picture books.

In 2002, French versions of 4 Nontan books have been published by Nathan, with the character being renamed to Miouki.

== Characters ==
Almost every character except Nontan and Tartan are unnamed because according to its creator, they "didn't feel the need".

The names of the characters are based on the original picture book version. Some characters have different names in Nontan to Issho.

=== Nontan ===
Nontan is a mischievous male kitten who likes to play and learn about the world around him.

He lives alone in a house with a flag on the roof, but since Tartan appeared, he has lived with Tartan.

His age varies from work to work and is not constant. He was 4 years old in Nontan no Tanjōbi (Note: Japanese: ノンタンのたんじょうび; lit. Nontan's Birthday).

=== Buta-san ===
Buta-san is a piglet. His favorite food are apples.

=== Rabbit ===
There are 3 pink rabbits in the book. One is a boy and two are girls, but they are indistinguishable by their appearance.

These rabbits are Nontan's playful friends, who join him in games, adventures, and everyday preschool activities. All of them are six years old.

In the CGI anime, individual voice actors were in charge.

=== Tanuki-san ===
Tanuki-san is a tanuki, aged 3. He likes to look at the sky and the sea. He likes singing, but he's pretty tone deaf.

=== Kuma-san ===
Kuma-san is a bear, aged 8. He is a leader who helps everyone when they are in trouble, but he is usually very busy. He likes books, naps, and fishes.

=== Tartan ===
Tartan is Nontan's sister with a blue ribbon. She loves mischiefs and onis.

In 2001, she first appeared in Nontan Imōtoīna (Note: Japanese: ノンタンいもうといいな). The name comes from the name of Kiyono's son's sister.

The inverse of the vertical relationship between the actual picture book and the picture book was because Kiyono has mistaken his son for being older .

She appeared only in the 2002 animated series.

=== Hachi-san ===
A bee that flies around like watching over Nontan . He cannot speak, but he seems to be able to communicate.

=== Dr. Bear ===
A bear doctor who always treats Nontan when they get sick or injured.

== Anime ==
An anime series, titled Nontan to Issho (Note: Japanese: ノンタンといっしょ; lit. Nontan and Friends) ran from 1992 to 1994 on Fuji TV's children's program Ugōgorūga. A total of 265 episodes have been produced, two of which have not been broadcast.

Chiaki was in charge of the theme song and Nontan's voice actress. The narration is written by Hirano.

According to Pierrot's homepage, which was in charge of animation production, this work is planned as a "musical-style animation", and comical sound effects and music are effectively used.

There is also an entire story similar to a music clip.

In addition, despite being for young children, there are social episodes such as "Gorufujō".

The anime was also dubbed into Arabic, and was aired on SpaceToon in July, 2000.

Another anime made in CGI animation also aired on Kids Station in 2002.

== Video games ==
Title	Platform(s)	Released
Nontan to Issho: KuruKuru Puzzle	Super Famicom, Game Boy	April 28, 1994 (GB); November 25, 1994 (SFC)
Nontan to Issho: Nohara de Asobo	3DO	June 11, 1994
Nontan to Issho: Hashi no Okurino	3DO	May 19, 1995
Nontan to Issho: Wai Wai Nippon	Pico	January 2, 1996
Nontan to Issho: Anime Stamp	Pico	

== Character products ==
Character products have been temporarily released, such as at the time of Nontan to Issho's broadcast.

In March 2000, ITOCHU developed character products using the characters from the Nontan and Tom Tom ☆ Boo series as part of the Mama Nontan World Series. Mama Nontan is the nickname given to the book's author Sachiko Kiyono.
