= Yu Dan (academic) =

Yu Dan (Chinese: 于丹; pinyin: Yú Dān, born June 28, 1965) is a Chinese professor of media studies at China's Beijing Normal University. She is also assistant to the Dean, Faculty of Arts & Media, as well as the Department Chair of the Film & Television Media Department.

== Background ==
Yu was born in Beijing, China. She received a master's degree in ancient Chinese literature and a doctoral degree in film & TV studies from Beijing Normal University. She holds strategist/researcher positions in a roster of mass media groups such as China Television Artists Association, China Visual Association's Tertiary Arts committee, China Visual Association's Research Group, CCTV's Research Office, China News Research Group, China-Guangdong Research Institute, China-Guangdong Institute Legal Programs Committee, News Corp (Australia), etc. Yu is apparently a fan of pop music idols such as Jay Chou and Nan Quan Mama, a Chinese classic enthusiast and a Kunqu Opera performer. She is also unofficially known as "the chieftain of the fun-seeking club of the School of Media and Arts at Beijing Normal University."

== Lecture Room Program ==
In late 2006, a series of her lectures entitled "Yu Dan's Insights into the Analects" (于丹《论语》心得) was broadcast for seven days on China Central Television (CCTV) as part of the Lecture Room (《百家讲坛》) program. The transcript, edited into a book, sold 10,000 copies within the first day of release. Within 40 days, sales exceeded 1.5 million. By September 2007, the book has sold 4.2 million legal copies and an estimated 6 million pirated ones since its publication in December and remains on best-seller lists. It has been published in English under the more literally translated title Confucius from the Heart.

In the Spring Festival period of 2007, another series of her lectures "Yu Dan's Insights into Zhuangzi" (于丹《庄子》心得) was broadcast to much acclaim. The transcript "Yu Dan's Notes on Zhuangzi" sold 15,000 copies on its first day of release on March 3. Crowds of people lined up outside the Zhongguancun Xinhua bookstore, waiting as many as eight hours in the rain, just to get Yu Dan's autograph.

== Criticisms ==
Yu managed to become a household name in China because she abridged the works of Confucius (551-479 B.C.) and Zhuangzi (369-286 B.C.) to make it appear relevant to laymen with "colloquial re-wordings and vivid short stories". In an interview with New York Times, Yu attributed the popularity of her work to the stresses of life in the fast-changing nation and to historical factors (paraphrased): "Traditional thought has been criticized for so many years that there is genuine interest in rediscovering it." On the Baidu (《百度》) portal alone, there are over 20,000 posts on the "bulletin board" named after her. "White collar workers, college students, professors, migrant workers, community guards and retired grannies all had something to say."

Christian Caryl, writing in Hong Kong's Muse Magazine, has criticised Yu's book Confucius from the heart: Ancient Wisdom for Today's World: 'New-Agers in the West have made an industry out of freeze-drying non-Western religions until they're tasteless enough for the indiscriminate modern palate. Yu's book is the first time I've seen a non-Westerner up to the same sort of thing.'
