= Yutaka Hara =

Japanese writer (born 1953)

- Born: April 28, 1953 (age 73); Kumamoto
- Occupation: Writer/illustrator
- Writing career
- Language: Japanese
- Notable work: Kaiketsu Zorori (Incredible Zorori)
- Notable awards: KFS Contest Kodansha Children's Literature Award, 1974
- Website: www.zorori.com

Yutaka Hara (原 ゆたか, Hara Yutaka; born April 28, 1953) is a Japanese writer and illustrator of children's literature. He was born in Kumamoto in 1953, and is the winner of the 1974 KFS Contest Kodansha Children's Literature Award (KFSコンテスト・講談社児童図書部門賞受賞).

He is the author of several series of children's illustrated books including the very popular Kaiketsu Zorori (Incredible Zorori), Chiisana Mori (Small Forest), Meimon furaido chiken shougakkou (the famous fried chicken primary school]) and Touyuuki (Journey to the East: the title is a homage to the famous Chinese novel Journey to the West).

== Works ==
- Spinach Man (ほうれんそうマンシリーズ)
- Kaiketsu Zorori (かいけつゾロリシリーズ)
- Ishishi and Noshishi's series (イシシとノシシのスッポコヘッポコへんてこ話シリーズ)
- Prestigious Fried Chicken Elementary School (名門フライドチキン小学校シリーズ)
- Nyantan (にゃんたんシリーズ)
- Azumaasobi-ki (東遊記シリーズ)
- Haunted Uta-kun (おばけのユータくんシリーズ)
- Magic Souvenir (魔法のおみやげシリーズ)
- Pukapuka Chocolate Island (プカプカチョコレー島シリーズ)
- Yawamushi Ghost (よわむしおばけシリーズ)
- Small Forest (ちいさなもり)
- Santa Claus First Grader (サンタクロース一年生)
- Mr. Dairobo (大どろぼうブラブラ氏)
- Ninja Samurai Gum Chocolate Banana (にんじゃざむらい ガムチョコバナナシリーズ)
