= Telangana Public Service Commission =

State government agency in India

Telangana Public Service Commission (TGPSC)
- TGPSC Logo

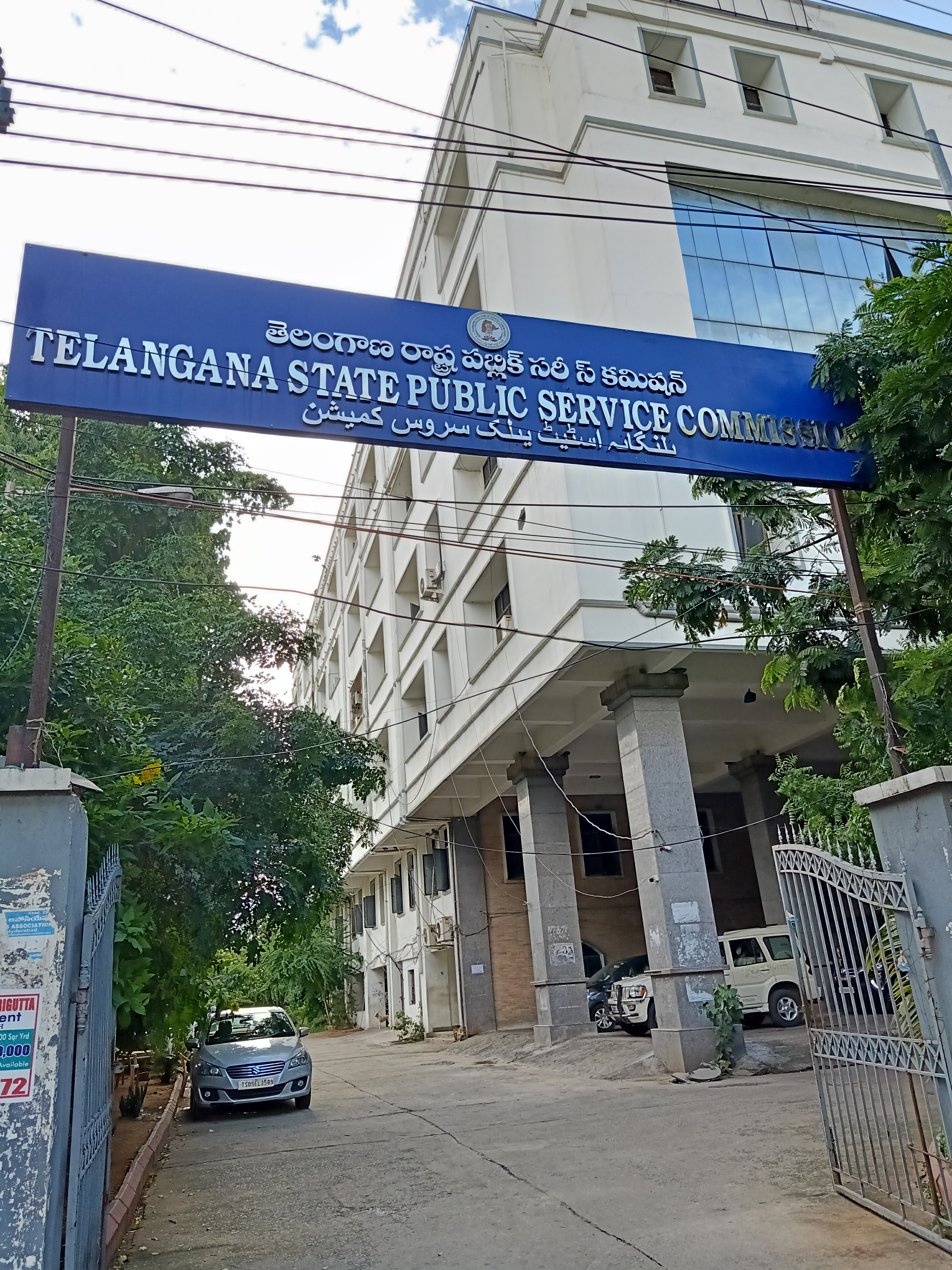
- Telangana State Public Service Commission Office, Hyderabad

Constitutional body overview
- Formed: 18 August 2014 (12 years ago), Hyderabad, Telangana, India
- Preceding Constitutional body: Andhra Pradesh Public Service Commission (until 2014)
- Jurisdiction: Telangana
- Status: Active
- Headquarters: Prathibha Bhavan, M. J. Road, Nampally, Hyderabad-500001, Telangana
- Constitutional body executives: Burra Venkatesham, (Chairman); Dr. E. Naveen Nicolas, IAS, Secretary
- Website: www.tgpsc.gov.in

The Telangana Public Service Commission (TGPSC) is a government body of the state of Telangana, India, established under the provisions of the Constitution of India, to select applicants for various state government jobs through competitive examinations, and according to the rules of reservation.

It is a constitutional body established under Article 315 of Constitution of India which provides a smooth and efficient functioning of the Government of Telangana by providing suitable candidates for various government posts and offer advice on various service matters like formulation of recruitment rules, promotions, transfers and disciplinary actions, etc.

The commission was formed on 2 June 2014 as per Andhra Pradesh Reorganisation Act, 2014, as the Andhra Pradesh Public Service Commission bifurcated into APPSC and TSPSC. The official website was launched on 11 April 2015 by governor E. S. L. Narasimhan. Ghanta Chakrapani was appointed the first chairman of TSPSC, who is a professor at Dr. B. R. Ambedkar Open University. The current chairman is Burra Venkatesham IAS (Retd VRS) and the commission's secretary is Priyanka Ala.

== History ==
=== Hyderabad Public Service Commission ===
The early Asaf Jahi rulers of the Hyderabad State followed the Mughal administrative traditions, practices and appointed public servants on the basis of nomination and representation. Sir Salar Jung I, the Diwan (Prime Minister) was the creator of modern Hyderabad Civil Service. In 1882, Salar Jung issued the extraordinary Jareeda and emphasized the need of educating and training the young Hyderabadis for recruitment in the Nizam's Services. He propounded the idea of building an efficient administrative system on the model of British India and introduced several administrative reforms. He dismantled the old/archaic administrative structure and streamlined the public institutions by creating a distinct civil service class. The establishment of Zilabandi system, creation of Subedari and Taluqdari system, Revenue, Police and Judicial reforms by Salar Jung facilitated the formation of Hyderabad Civil Service. Subsequently, the proclamation of Qanuncha Mubarik of 1892, the Cabinet Council, and the Executive Council (1919) framed rules and regulations governing the services as well as regulated and institutionalized the Hyderabad civil services.

In 1938, through a resolution of the Executive Council a committee was constituted composed of all Secretaries to Government with the Finance Member as the President and an officer of the Finance Department as Secretary to examine the possibility and role of an agency or agencies for recruitment and appointment and its/their sphere(s) of action. After detailed discussion, it was recommended to establish an independent and impartial recruitment agency, known as the Hyderabad Public Service Commission. The committee opined that "the efficiency of an administration depends on its personnel. It is therefore evident that the procedure of recruitment especially for the higher services of the administration, play an important role in creating and maintaining its standard and efficiency. Accordingly, the Hyderabad Public Service Commission was established by a Firman on 27 April 1947. It brought the entire administrative machinery of civil services of the Nizam's State in tune with modern times. The Hyderabad Civil Service, was a coveted service in the State of Hyderabad. It was considered to be an elite service, and the best of the government officers were inducted into it through a competitive examination. It was abolished after the police action in 1948 and its officers were absorbed into the Indian government civil services. Hyderabad Civil Service Committee was established and as a personnel agency it played a significant role in the management of civil services. It was independent in its functioning and no attempt was made to bring pressure on the decision-making process of the committee. It was a multifunctional agency and closely associated with all aspects of Hyderabad civil service. It had to conduct examinations for the selection and placement of the candidates for the various vacancies in different departments.

The Hyderabad Public Service Commission was constituted on the model of British Provincial Public Service Commission with similar functions. It consisted of a chairman and members not exceeding four in number. They were appointed by His Highness the Nizam on the recommendation of the president of the Executive Council. The chairman and members of the Hyderabad Public Service Commission were not permitted further employment after relinquishing their office.

The public commission established by the last Nizam, Mir Osman Ali Khan in 1947 became the forerunner of the Hyderabad Public Service Commission under the Constitution of India, during the period of Burgula Ramakrishna Rao, the first elected Chief Minister of Hyderabad State. The Hyderabad Public Service Commission was finally merged into the Andhra Pradesh Public Service Commission in 1956. Andhra Pradesh Public Service Commission was in existence until the united Andhra Pradesh State was bifurcated into Telangana State and AP State in accordance with AP Reorganization Act, 2014.

=== Formation of Telangana State and constitution of TSPSC ===
According to the Andhra Pradesh Reorganisation Act, 2014 the Telangana State came into existence with effect from the appointed day i.e., 2 June 2014. Constitution of Telangana State Public Service Commission (TSPSC) Section 83(2) of the Andhra Pradesh Re-Organisation Act, 2014 (Central Act.6/2014) provides for constitution of a Public Service Commission in the Successor State of Telangana.

In exercise of the powers conferred under Article 316 (1) & (2) of the Constitution of India, Governor of Telangana appointed Prof. Ghanta Chakrapani, a well known academician and journalist as the first chairman of the newly constituted Telangana State Public Service Commission.

== Organisation ==
Articles 316 to 319 deal with the structure of state public service commissions. Telangana State Public Service Commission is headed by the chairman with three additional members, all appointed by the Governor of Telangana, in accordance with the above provisions of the Constitution of India.

== First Commission ==
After the formation of Telangana State in 2014 the governor of Telangana appointed the commission consisting of a chairman and three members. The names of the members are:

1. Ghanta Chakrapani (Chairman), 18 December 2014 - 17 December 2020
2. Ch. Vittal (Telangana Activist)
3. Banoth Chandravathi (Former MLA)
4. Mohd. Mateenuddin Quadri (Social Activist)
5. T. Vivek
6. D. Krishna Reddy
7. K. Rammohan Reddy
8. M. Rajender
9. Ch. Vidya Sagar Rao
10. Prof Ch. Sailu
11. Banala Manmadha Reddy

== Second Commission ==
1. Dr B. Janardhan Reddy (Chairman)
2. Kotla Aruna Kumari
3. Sumithra Anand Tanoba
4. Karam Ravinder Reddy
5. Ramavath Dhan Singh
6. Prof.B.Linga Reddy
7. Dr.Aravelli Chandrashekar Rao
8. R.Satyanarayana

== Third Commission ==
On 25 January 2024, the governor of Telangana appointed the new commission consisting of six members.

1. M. Mahender Reddy (Chairman)
2. Dr. E. Naveen Nicolas, IAS, SECRETARY, TSPSC
3. Smt Anita Rajendra ( IAS Retd.)
4. Dr Amir Ullah Khan, Economist
5. Prof Narri Yadaiah
6. Sri Yarabadi Ram Mohana Rao
7. Smt Palavai Rajani Kumari

== Fourth Commission ==
The Telangana government has appointed Burra Venkatesham as the new chairman of the Telangana Public Service Commission on 30 November 2024 after the term of the previous chairman M. Mahender Reddy ended as he attained 62 years. He assumed charge as the Telangana Public Service Commission (TGPSC) Chairman on 5 December 2024.

1. Burra Venkatesham (Chairman)
2. Smt Anita Rajendra (IAS Retd)
3. Dr Amir Ullah Khan, Economist
4. Prof Narri Yadaiah
5. Sri Yarabadi Ram Mohana Rao
6. Smt Palavai Rajani Kumari
7. Sri P. Vishwa Prasad (IPS)
8. Sri C. Chandrakanth Reddy
9. Sri Prof. Laxmikanth Rathod

== Functions ==
One of the primary functions of the commission is to select the best suitable candidates for various government posts in Telangana State. Important statutory functions of the commission are:

- Direct Recruitment
- Approval of Statutory Rules relating to State and Subordinate Services
- Concurrence for Compassionate Appointments in Special Cases
- Recruitment by Transfer / Promotion
- Disciplinary Cases
- Conduct of Departmental Examinations to State Government Employees
- Half Yearly Examinations
- Temporary Appointments - Concurrence of the Commission

== Awards ==
- Skoch Order of Merit Award-2015
- 13 awards in National Panchayat Awards 2023

== See also ==
- Andhra Pradesh Public Service Commission
- Union Public Service Commission
- Staff Selection Commission
- List of Public service commissions in India
