= Venkatesham =

Venkatesham is a Telugu surname and masculine given name. Notable people with the surname include:

- Burra Venkatesham (born 1968), Indian author
- Vinai Venkatesham, British football administrator
