= Burra Venkatesham =

Officer of the Indian Administrative Service (IAS) and author

Burra Venkatesham Goud
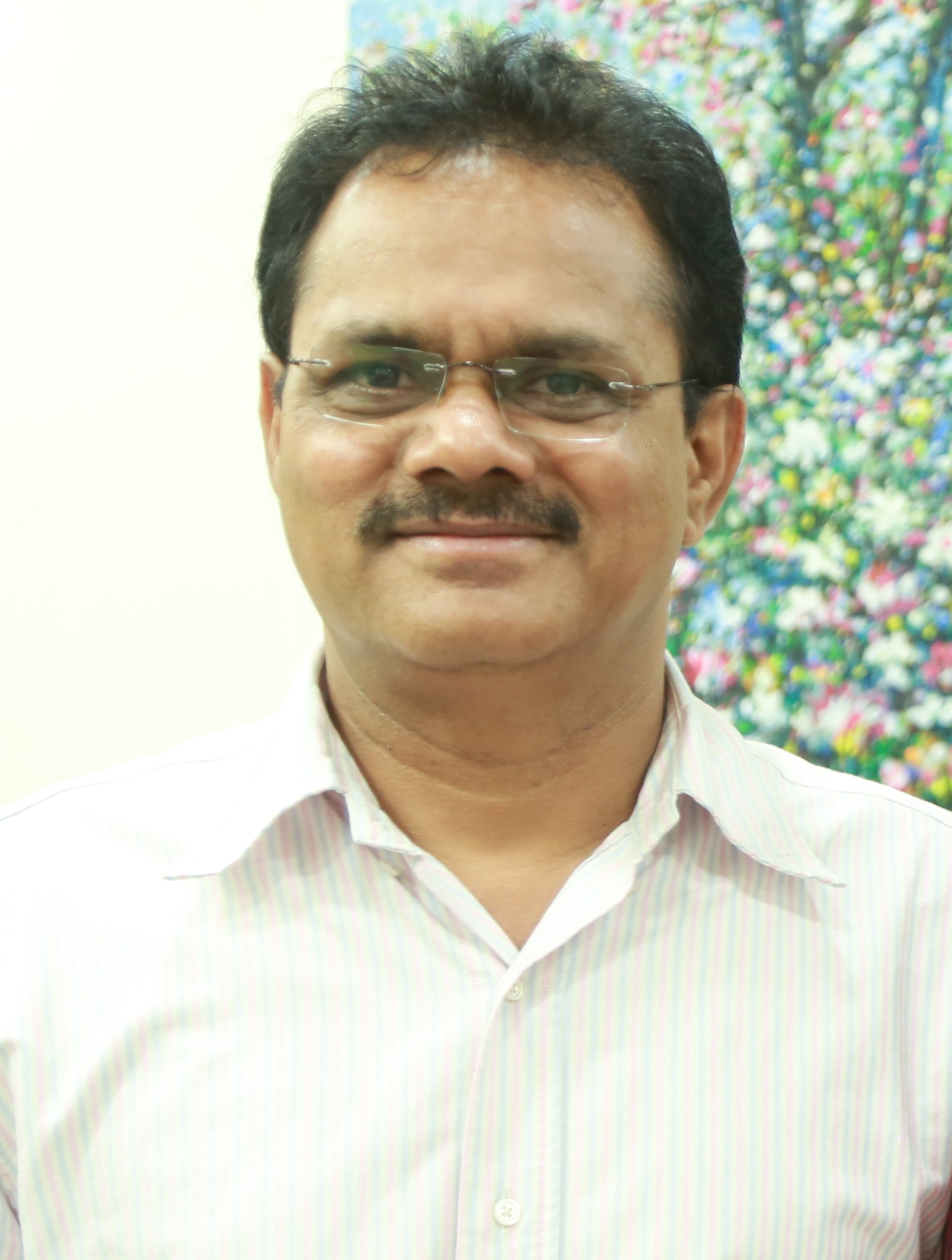
- Venkatesham in 2019

Telangana Public Service Commission Chairman
- Incumbent
- Assumed office 5 December 2024
- Preceded by: M. Mahender Reddy

Principal Secretary to Government, Education Department
- In office 18 December 2023 - 4 December 2024
- Succeeded by: N. Sridhar

Personal details
- Born: 10 April 1968 (age 58) Obul Keshavapur, Jangam, Telangana, India
- Spouse: Geethalakshmi
- Children: Yogya Hariprakash, Bhavyasree
- Occupation: Civil servant
- Writing career
- Notable work: Selfie of Success

Burra Venkatesham IAS (born 10 April 1968) is an officer of the Indian Administrative Service (IAS) and the author of Selfie of Success (2019). He is from Jangam, Telangana, India.

Burra Venkatesham was appointed as Telangana Public Service Commission (TGPSC) chairman on 30 November 2024 and he took charge on 5 December2024. He as taken Voluntary Retirement Scheme (VRS) before stepping into the role of TGPSC Chairperson.

== Early life ==
Venkatesham was born in Jangam, Telangana in an economically disadvantaged family. He was the first person in the family to receive education.

== Education ==
Venkatesham completed in Hyderabad his BA at the Dr. B.R. Ambedkar College in 1989 and LLB from Osmania University in 1992. He is an alumnus of Andhra Pradesh Residential School, Sarvail, Telangana.

== Career ==
Venkatesham became an officer of the Indian administrative service in 1995 from the Telangana cadre. He was the District Collector of the Medak district from 2005 to 2008, during which the administration was awarded the SA8000 certificate by the Social Accountability International, New York. The Medak administration was the first in Asia to receive the certificate. His experience as the District Collector was written about by the 11th President of India, A.P.J Abdul Kalam, in his book, Pathways to Greatness: Coming Together for Change.

In February 2014, the then Chief Secretary to Andhra Pradesh, Pradip Kumar Mohanty, appointed Venkatesham as part of the three-member team of senior IAS officers for the Andhra Pradesh Reorganisation Committee. For the implementation of the Andhra Pradesh Reorganisation Act, 2014, he was responsible for the Agriculture, Horticulture, Sericulture, Civil Supplies, Animal Husbandry, Fisheries and Dairy Development, Backward Castes Welfare, Minorities Welfare, Social Welfare, Tribal Welfare, and Rain Shadow Area Development Secretariat departments. His role was also to support the Services and Procedures, Educational Institutions, and Medical Institutions committees under the General Administration (SR) Department. He is the first Home Secretary of Telangana state.

He is the secretary to the Government of Telangana for Youth Advancement, Tourism and Culture (YAT&C) department since 2015. He is the Secretary to the Backward Class Welfare department, the Chairman of the Chitramayee State Art Gallery, the Chairman of National Institute of Tourism and Hospitality Management, a part of the Management team of Telangana Tourism, and was the Chairman of Society for Employment Promotion & Training in Twin Cities (SETWIN)

As the secretary of Culture, Venkatesham organized International Sweets Festival in Hyderabad and the International Snacks Festival in collaboration with Hyderabad Metro.

B. Venkatesham assumed office as Education department Principal Secretary and also full additional charge as Collegiate Education Commissioner on 18 December 2023. He also holds the Full Additional Charge as the Principal Secretary to Governor Jishnu Dev Verma.

== Public activities ==
- Bathukamma on water
- International Kite Festival
- Key organizer of World Telugu Conference
- Restoration of Qutub Shahi tombs
- Tobacco free tourist spots in Telangana
- Ramappa Temple as UNESCO World Heritage Sites in India
- Key organizer of the 31st Hyderabad Book Fair
- Cable suspension bridge at Kuntala waterfalls

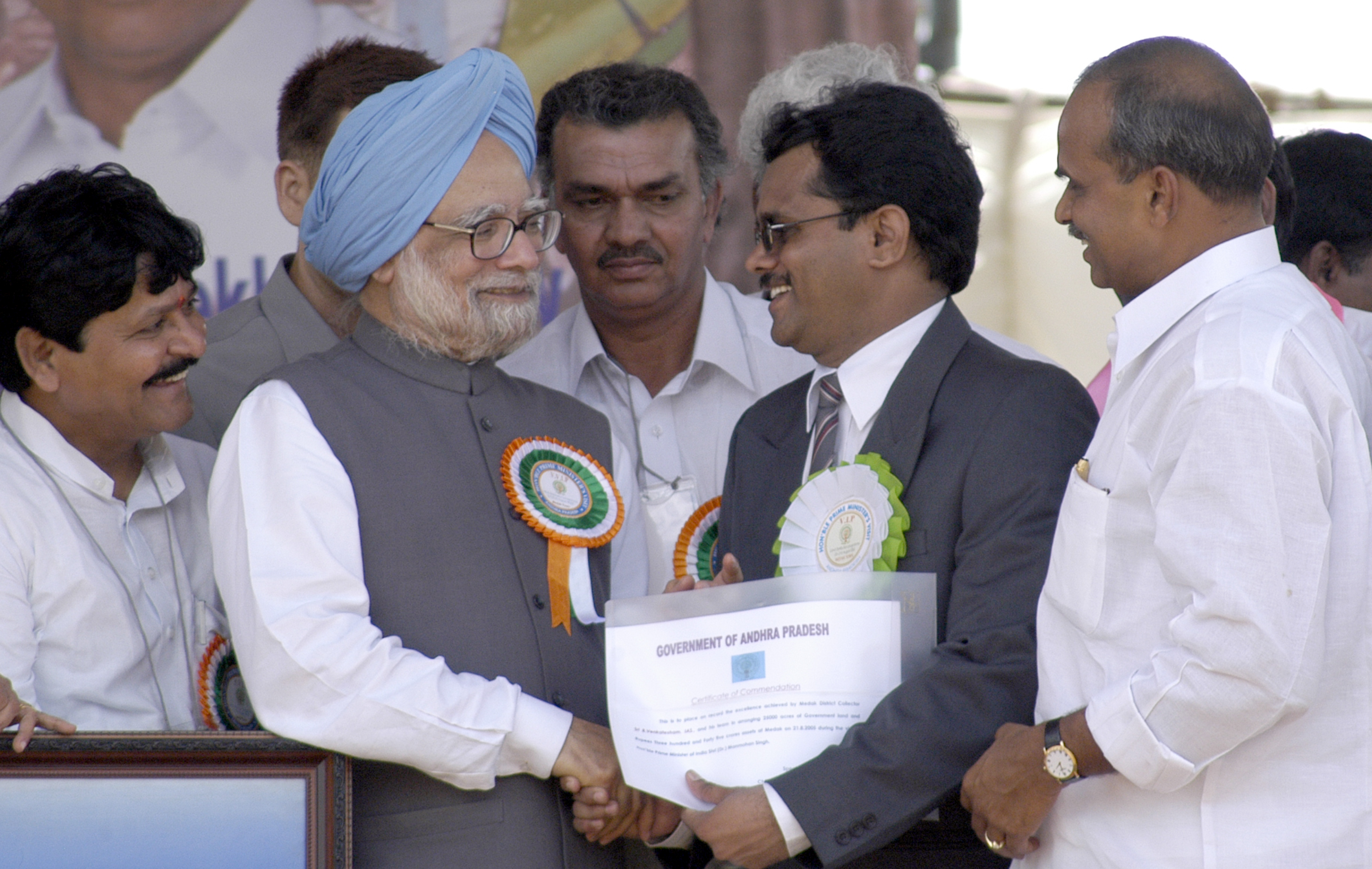
Burra Venkatesham with Prime Minister Manmohan Singh and Cm YS Rajashekhar Reddy

== Literary works ==
In 2019, Venkatesham authored the book, Selfie of Success. He was felicitated by V. Srinivas Goud, the minister for Tourism, for writing the book.

- Selfie of Success
- Gelupu Pilupu
- Jeevana Dhanya Shathakam
- Buddham Saranam Gacchami
- Ramayana Parivaram

== Recognition ==
In 2019, Venkatesham was named the Person of the Year by the Creative India magazine.
