= Ghanta Chakrapani =

Prof. Ghanta Chakrapani
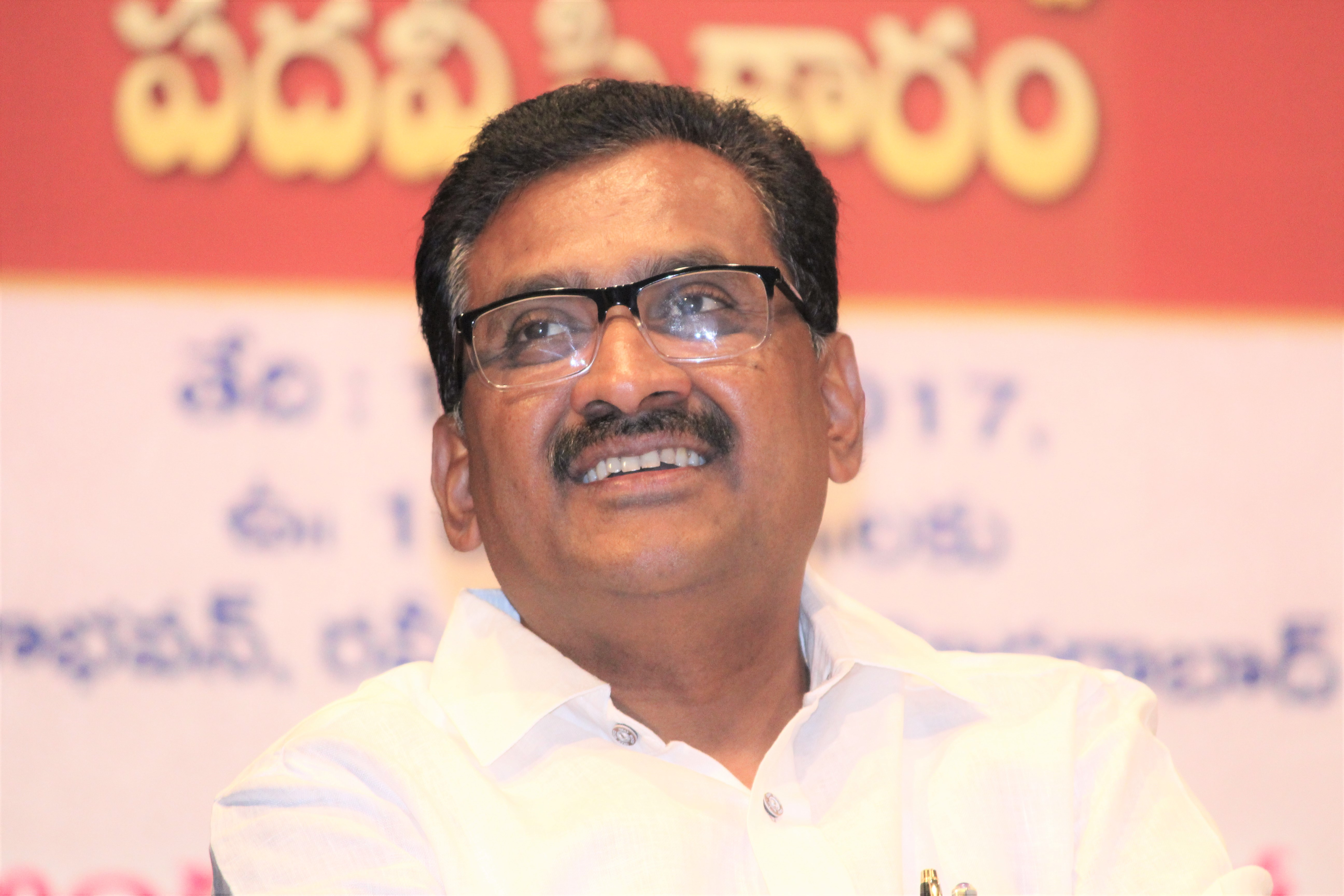

Dr. B.R. Ambedkar Open University (BRAOU) Vice-Chancellor
- In office 6 December 2024 – Incumbent
- Preceded by: Prof.K.Seetharama Rao

TGPSC Chairman
- In office 18 December 2014 – 17 December 2020
- Preceded by: Position Established
- Succeeded by: Dr. B. Janardhan Reddy

Personal details
- Born: 4 January 1965 (age 61) Yaswada village, Karimnagar district, Telangana, India
- Parent(s): Ghanta Janani, Ghanta Mogilaiah
- Occupation: Professor, Political analyst
- Known for: Ex. Chairman; Telangana State Public Service Commission
- Website: ghantapatham.blogspot.in

Prof. Ghanta Chakrapani (born 4 January 1965) is an academician, public intellectual, and the founding chairman of Telangana State Public Service Commission, a position he held from 2014 to 2020. He has also been known as a journalist, writer, public speaker, policy expert and political analyst. At present, he is the Vice-chancellor of Dr. B. R. Ambedkar Open University, Hyderabad. Associated with people's movements, democratic movements, and rights movements, he became a public intellectual in the region. Since the Bhuvanagiri meeting in 1997, he has been directly associated with the Telangana separate statehood movement and emerged as one of the protagonists of the Telangana agitation, as a writer, public speaker, columnist, and television analyst, he played multiple roles in the spread of Telangana ideology. He is one of the founders of the Peace Initiative Committee, which negotiated with the government and Maoist Naxalites for peace talks in 2004–05. During the talks, the Government of Andhra Pradesh (AP) appointed him as the convenor for the Cease-Fire Monitoring Committee. After the formation of a separate state for Telangana, the government of Telangana appointed Dr. Chakrapani as the first Chairman of TSPSC. After assuming the charge as Chairman, TSPSC, in December 2014, Prof. Chakrapani has introduced several path-breaking reforms and IT initiatives to modernize the conduct of examinations and processing of recruitments.The Hans India, thereby transforming the youngest State PSC in the country into a modern public service commission. The Hindu

During his tenure, the TSPSC notified 36,758 posts through 108 recruitment notifications; of them, the recruitment process is completed to 35,724 posts and unit lists for 31,052 posts were sent to the state government. This is considered as highest number of jobs in the country through a state PSC during that period.

Ghanta Chakrapani was Appointed as Dr B.R Ambedkar Open University Vice-Chancellor on 6 December 2024 by Telangana state government.

== Education ==
Born in Karimnagar District, Telangana, completed his primary school education at government schools Yaswada, Elgandal, and Ramagundam and his high school education at ZPSS Elgandal. Completed intermediate in biological sciences from the government junior college in Sultanabad, in present-day Peddapalli district. Dr. Chakrapani has done his graduation, post-graduation (MA) in Sociology (1990), Post-Graduation in Communication and Journalism (1992) and Ph.D. in Sociology of Religion (2001) from Osmania University Hyderabad. He was awarded the All India Sociological Association Gold Medal for outstanding performance in the M.A. in Sociology by securing highest marks in the University.

== Career ==
Ghanta Chakrapani started his career as a journalist in 1985. He was a reporter/Sub-Editor in Udayam, Andhra Jyothi, which are the popular Telugu language newspapers published from Hyderabad. Later he worked as Public Relations Officer at Andhra Pradesh Open University for a very brief period and as a newsreader at All India Radio (AIR), Hyderabad.

=== Academic ===
Dr. Chakrapani shifted to academics in the early 1990s. He worked as a lecturer in the Department of Sociology at [Kakatiya University], Warangal. Later he joined as Assistant Professor at Dr. B. R. Ambedkar Open University, Hyderabad. He served in the University in various capacities including the Head-Department of Sociology, Dean, Faculty of Social Sciences, Director, Academic, Director, Center for Staff Training and Development (CSTD) and Director, Centre for Social Empowerment. He also served as the Registrar of the University from 2004–06 and developed and coordinated new academic programmes and courses in different fields like Sociology, Political Science, Human Rights, Women Studies, Mass Media, and other Social Sciences.

His fellowships and academic distinctions include Fellow, India China Institute, New York, Senior Fellow, JAPSS, USA, European Commission, Austria, Member, Sahitya Academy etc. He has several scholarly publications to his credit. He has published 13 books and hundreds of articles in Telugu and English. During Telangana Movement, he wrote "Ghantapatham. https://ghantapatham.blogspot.com/, a popular weekly column in Namasthe Telangana Telugu daily continuously for three years and participated in TV debates to educate the masses. Dr. Chakrapani is a strong proponent of Telangana movement and had actively participated in major agitations for a separate Telangana State as a public speaker. He hosted a popular television show, The Insider. He is having his own YouTube Channel Ghantapatham.

== Bibliography ==
- Vishva vithaalikudu Dr. babasaheb Ambedkar, Ambedkar Memorial Trust, Hyderabad (2023)
- . B. R. Ambedkar and Modernization of Administration in India, Dr. B. R. Ambedkar Open University, Hyderabad- 2018
- Pambalas:Aneka publications, Hyderabad, 2009, ISBN 978-81-909644-0-1
- Empowered Voices, Success Stories of Distance Education, CSE Publications, Hyderabad, 2009, ISBN 978-81-908563-1-7
- Memu Saitham CSE Publications, Hyderabad, 2009, ISBN 978-81-908563-0-0
- Globalisation and Social Exclusion in India, Milind Publications, New Delhi, 2009
- Education, Exclusion and Empowerment, Milind Publications, New Delhi, 2008
- Samajika Sandarbham, Aneka Publications, Hyderabad, 2006
- Samajashastra Nighantuvu, Dictionary of Sociology- Co-authored, Telugu Academy, Government of AP, Hyderabad, 2000
- Samajashastra Moola sutraalu, -Principles of Sociology, Co-authored, Telugu Academy, Government of AP, Hyderabad, 1996
- Samajika Manavashastram-Prathamika Sutraalu, Principles of Social Anthropology, Telugu Academy, Government of AP,
- Boggu Porallo Aggi Bavuta, Coal mining in the context of Economic Reforms: Umesh paperbacks, Hyderabad-2010
- Globalisation and Social Transition in India and China- Authors Press, New Delhi-2013, ISBN 978-81-7273-692-7
