= Andhra Pradesh Public Service Commission =

State government body

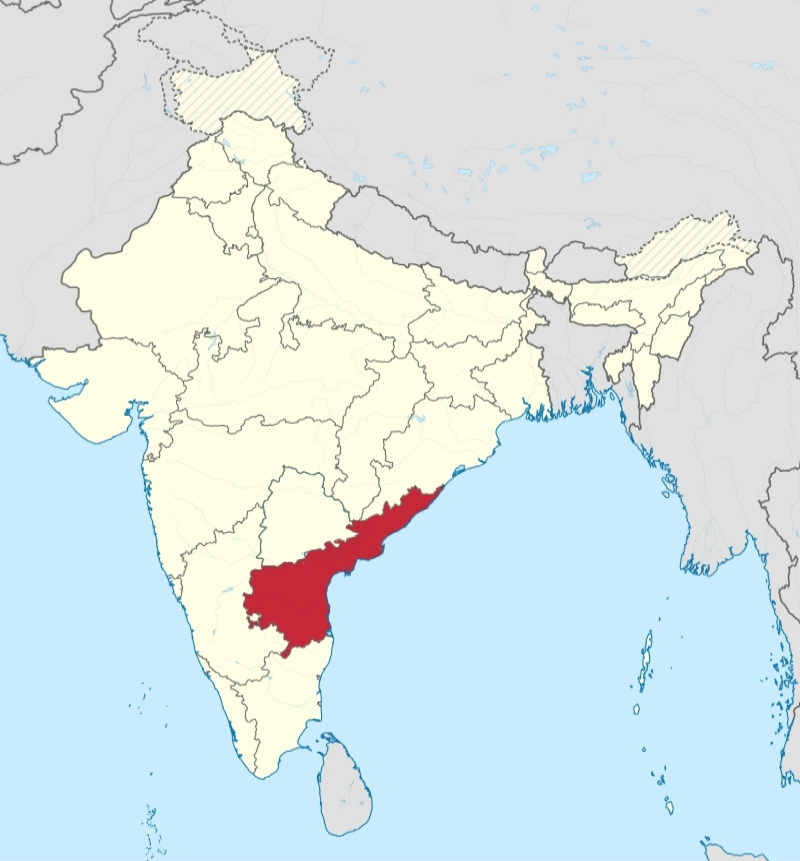
- Abbreviation: Andhra Pradesh Public Service Commission
- Formation: 1956
- Type: Constitutional body
- Purpose: Recruitment
- Headquarters: Vijayawada, Andhra Pradesh
- Location: APPSC Office, Mahatma Gandhi Road, Vijayawada-520 010
- Region served: Andhra Pradesh
- Website: psc.ap.gov.in

The Andhra Pradesh Public Service Commission (APPSC) is a government body of the state of Andhra Pradesh, India, established by the Constitution of India, responsible for the recruitment of candidates for various state government jobs through competitive examinations. It is headquartered at Vijayawada.

== History ==
APPSC was formed when the state of Andhra Pradesh formed on 1 November 1956. Earlier, the commission was known as the Andhra Service Commission (formed in 1953) which was based on the regulations of Madras Public Service Commission. Later in 1956, APPSC was formed by merging the Andhra Public Service Commission and Hyderabad Public Service Commissions.

On the eve of the formation of Andhra Pradesh Public Service Commission, Andhra Public Service Commission was functioning with a Chairman and two Members and Hyderabad Public Service Commission was functioning with one Member. Hence, A.P. Public Service Commission was constituted with a Chairman and 3 Members. With increasing workload, the Government enhanced the strength of the Commission to Chairman and 5 Members in 1981 and later to Chairman and 7 Members in 1983. The government again reviewed the strength in 1994 and enhanced it to Chairman and 9 Members. This is the present strength also. After the bifurcation of Andhra Pradesh in accordance with the Andhra Pradesh Reorganisation Act, 2014 the headquarters of PSC was shifted from Telangana to Vijayawada.

== Present Chairman ==
The present Chairman of Andhra Pradesh Public Service Commission is Prof. C. Sashidhar is serving as Chairman (FAC).

== Duties and functions ==
Widely known as APPSC which is a part of the Andhra Pradesh government. The Public Service Commissions had been established under Article 315 of the Constitution of India. The functions of the Commission are enumerated in Article 320 of the Constitution.

=== The statutory functions of the Commission are as follows ===
Direct Recruitment (Article 320 (1)) Recruitment by transfer (Article 320(3)(b)) Statutory rules relating to services (Article 320 (3)(a) and (b)) Disciplinary cases (Article 320 (3)(c) and regulations 17 (1)(a) to (e)) Reimbursement of legal expenses (Article 320 (3)(d)) Wound and extraordinary pension cases (Article 320 (3)(e))

=== Commission is entrusted with the following items of work ===
Conduct of departmental tests for several departments Conduct of examination for admission to RIMC, Dehradun. Conduct of half yearly examination for IAS and IPS Officers and proficiency tests for AIS Officers. Watching of temporary appointments exceeding 3 months and according to concurrence for their continuance (regulation 16) Consultation in cases of appointment of contract extending over 5 years (regulation 16).

== See also ==
- Telangana State Public Service Commission
- Union Public Service Commission
- Staff Selection Commission
- List of Public service commissions in India
