= M. Mahender Reddy =

Indian public servant

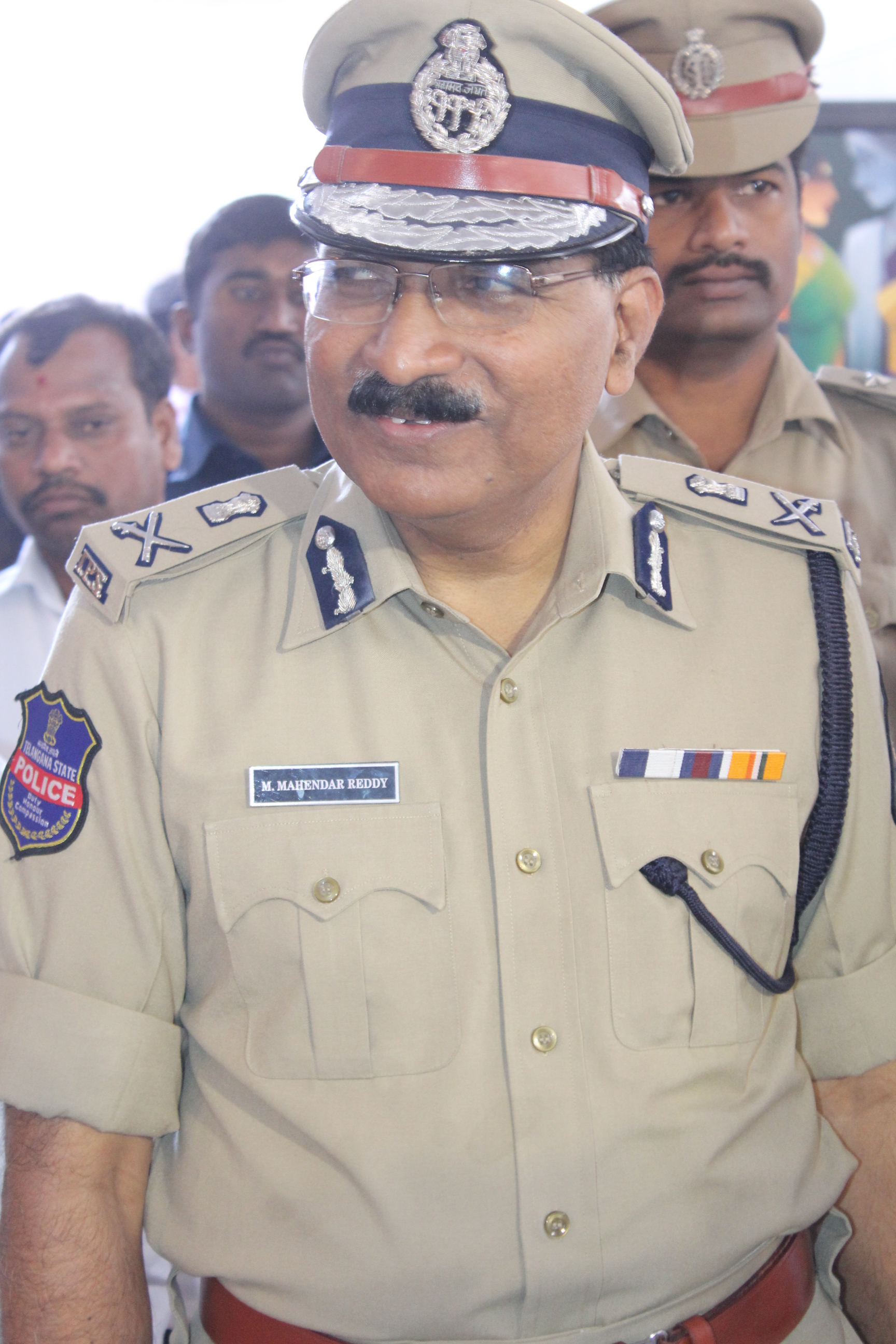

TGPSC Chairman
- In office 25 January 2024 – 3 December 2024
- Preceded by: B Janardhan Reddy
- Succeeded by: Burra Venkatesham

2nd Director General of Police of Telangana
- In office 17 November 2017 – 31 December 2022
- Preceded by: Anurag Sharma
- Succeeded by: Anjani Kumar

Personal details
- Born: 3 December 1962 (age 63) Kistapuram at Munagala
M. Mahender Reddy
- Police career
- Rank: Director general of police

Mudireddy Mahendar Reddy (born 3 December 1962) was the Chairman of the Telangana Public Service Commission (TGPSC) and he was an Indian police Service officer (1986-batch) he was the 2nd and former Director general of police of Telangana since from 10 April 2018. He previously served as the first Commissioner of Police, Hyderabad City after the formation of Telangana.

M Mahendar Reddy was appointed as the new chairman of the Telangana Public Service Commission (TGPSC) on 26 January 2024 and retired on 2 December 2024 after attaining 62 years as per the State government orders.

== Early life ==
Reddy was born on December 3, 1962, and is a native of Khammam district, Telangana, India.

== Education ==
M. Mahendar Reddy is a graduate in civil engineering from NIT Warangal (then known as Regional Engineering College), Mr. Reddy got selected for IPS while pursuing M.Tech in Indian Institute of Technology Delhi. He also obtained a master's degree in Public Personnel Management from the Osmania University, when he was in service. He obtained his Ph.d from Jawaharlal Nehru Technological University Hyderabad in 2020.

== Career ==
Reddy served as Assistant SP of Godavarikhani in Karimnagar and Guntur town, Additional SP of Bellampally in Adilabad and SP of Nizamabad and Kurnool districts. He was East zone DCP in Hyderabad commissionerate for three years from 1995. Reddy has served as a faculty member at the Sardar Vallabhbhai Patel National Police Academy and has gone on study tours to the USA and the UK to study police systems. He also served as the Commissioner of Police for Hyderabad City.
