= Selfie of Success =

Book by Burra Venkatesham

- Author: Burra Venkatesham
- Language: English, Telugu, Spanish, Bengali
- Genre: Non-fiction
- Published: 7 July 2019
- Publisher: Pratap Chowdary, Street Lib Indianara
- Publication place: India
- ISBN: 978-8832587005
- Website: Selfie of Success

Selfie of Success is a non-fiction book in the self-help genre, written by Burra Venkatesham. Divided into five chapters, the book builds on the real-life anecdotes of successful personalities into a story. It was published on 7 July 2019.

== Reception ==
Business World (India) calls Selfie of Success "a literary triumph...a comprehensive snapshot of what success is." The Week (India) opines that the author "tries to present a comprehensive and distinct perspective of success in this book. And he is successful in this effort." DNA India calls the book "an honest approach to an elusive pursuit in human life." The Hindu said the "book gives equal focus on side effects of success — ego; sins of success — arrogance, pride, greed and envy with examples of real life stories." Actor and producer, Mahesh Babu, recommended the book as part of the #ReadingIsGoodChallenge initiative, drawing parallels to the Maharshi film.

Commenting on the narrative of the book, The New Indian Express says: "The common thread of the tales is that these highly successful people didn’t give up and continued believing in themselves despite all the hurdles."

Within few weeks of its release, the book reached the No.1 book sales ratings on Amazon India.

== Bibliography ==
- Selfie of Success, by Burra Venkatesham. Street Lib, 2019. ISBN 8832587009, 978-8832587005
