= Amir Ullah Khan =

Indian academic and economist

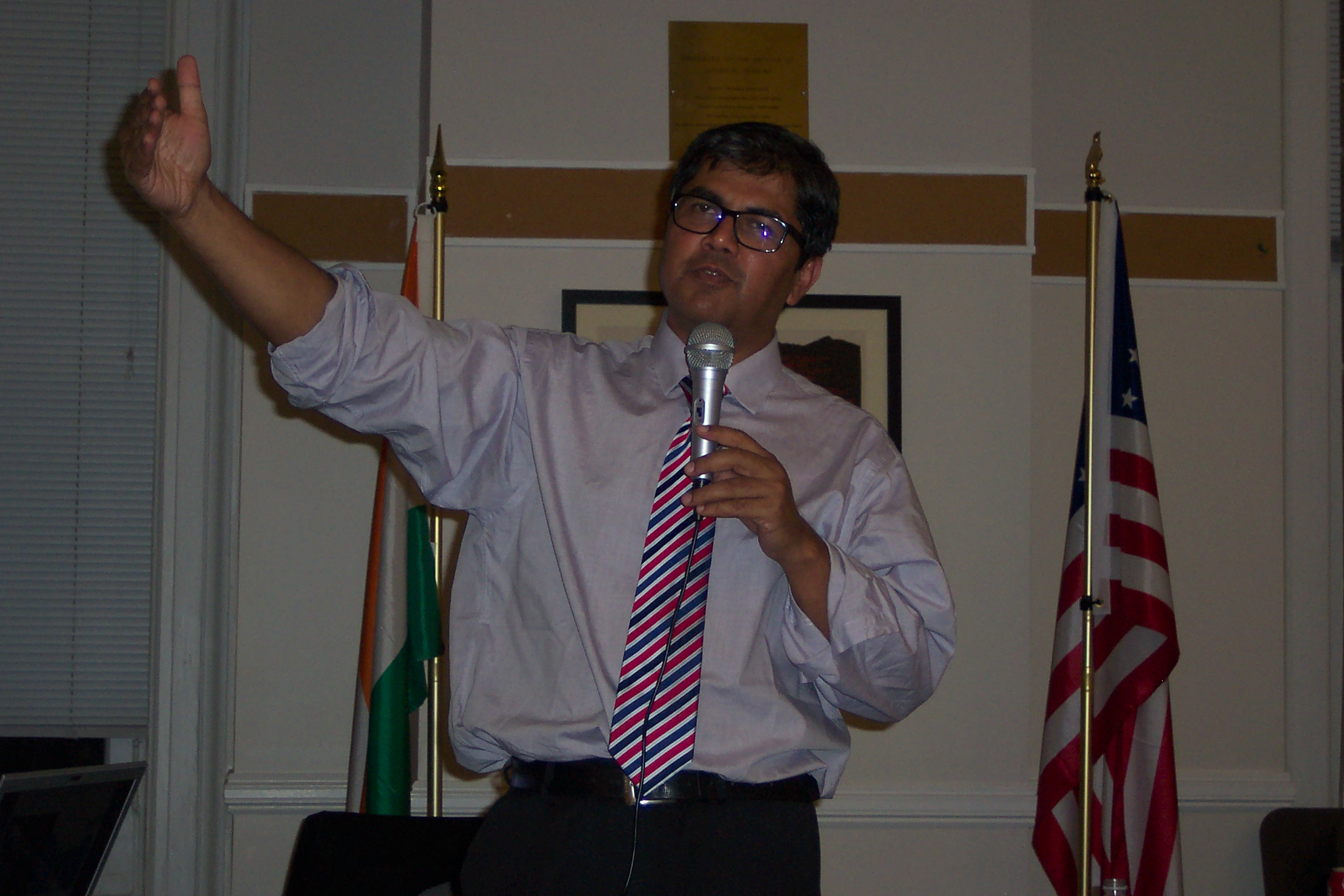
Dr. Amir Ullah Khan.

Amir Ullah Khan is a civil servant, Development economist and Visiting Professor at the Indian School of Business. Dr Khan is now a Member of the Telangana Public Service Commission and also a Member of the Government of India's Technical Advisory committee on Prices and Cost of living. He is a visiting professor at the Indian School of Business, Tata Institute of Social Sciences and at NALSAR in Hyderabad. Amir has worked as Director at the India Development Foundation, at the BMGF as Deputy Director and at Encyclopaedia Britannica as Executive Director and Editor.

Prof. Khan has been a member of the Board of Governors at the https://defindia.org/, GyanShaala and the Welham Girls' School. He has been on the founding governing board of the Presidency University, Bangalore. He has served the PHD Chamber of Commerce and Industry as its Deputy Director General. He then was a member of the Government of India's Amitabh Kundu Committee set up in 2013. He was also a member of the Telangana government's Commission of Inquiry on socio-economic conditions, headed by G. Sudhir, Prof. Khan edits SAGE's Journal of Development Policy and Practice with Dr Bobby John. He has been the Founder-Vice Chancellor at the Glocal University in Saharanpur and Adjunct Professor of Business and Law at the Edith Cowan University. Prof. Khan has also taught at the Manipal Institute of Technology, FORE School of Management, NMIMS and at the Indian Institute of Foreign Trade in Delhi. Prof. Khan has been guest faculty at the Foreign Service Institute, Ministry of External Affairs, MCRHRDI, Infinity Business School, and Fore School of Management in New Delhi. He has worked on various research projects for the European Commission, National Council for Applied Economic Research, Planning Commission, Confederation of Indian Industry and the World Bank, and has written on economics and policy issues.

Amir joined the Indian Civil Service and belongs to the 1993 batch and attended the 59th Foundation Course at LBSNAA. Amir Ullah Khan studied at The Hyderabad Public School, Ramanthapur, then at University College of Engineering, Osmania University. He went on to study rural management at the Institute of Rural Management Anand. Prof. Khan then received his PhD from the Jamia Millia Islamia.

Prof. Khan gave a lecture at the US-India Policy Institute in Washington, DC, on "Indian Economic Growth Patterns, Impact on Poverty and Sustainable Global Partnerships." On February 25, 2013, he gave a lecture at the Harvard University's School of Public Health on the Indian growth story and the impact on the health and other development sectors, as part of the School's Global Health Seminar series. He has worked on education and health Policy with several institutions, including the NITI Aayog

Prof. Khan is a Founder Trustee at the E&H Foundation, whose mission is to ‘enable quality education and health services for the underprivileged in India, with a special focus on Uttar Pradesh.’

He is also the director of Policy Talks, a Section 8 company that promotes public policy education particularly to school students.

Amir Ullah Khan has been a columnist at the LiveMint, the Etemaad daily and the Deccan Herald writing on various aspects of India's economic policy, growth and development.

== Publications ==
1. "How India Must Tackle China's Killer Bug," with Saleema Razvi, Mint, January 2020.
2. Education and Health: Special Focus on Uttar Pradesh, with Rajiv Kumar, Global University Press, 2014
3. Common Property Resource Management: A Focus on Forestry, with Mousumi Majumdar, Academic Foundation, 2011
4. The WTO Deadlocked: Understanding the Dynamics of International Trade, with Debashis Chakraborty, SAGE, June 2008
5. States of the Indian Economy: Towards a Larger Constituency for Second Generation Economic Reforms, with Harsh Vivek, SAGE, November 2007
6. Agri Business and the Small Farmer, Edited, Angus and Grapher, January 2006
7. India Pakistan Trade: Towards a prosperous South Asia, CII and IDF, October 2005
8. Intellectual Property Rights, Beyond 2005, with Bibek Debroy, DC Books, December 2004
9. Integrating the Rural Poor Into Markets, edited with Bibek Debroy, Academic Foundation, New Delhi, 2004
10. Enabling Agricultural Markets for the Small Indian Farmer, edited with Bibek Debroy, Bookwell, New Delhi, 2003
11. Identification of Bottlenecks in the Judicial Procedure, with Pushpa Sharma and Aparna Rajagopal, Allied Publishers Limited New Delhi; 1997
