= Dr. B.R. Ambedkar Open University =

Public university in Hyderabad, India

- Former name: Andhra Pradesh Open University
- Motto: Education at Your Doorstep
- Type: State university
- Established: 1982; 44 years ago
- Affiliations: UGC
- Chancellor: Governor of Telangana
- Vice-Chancellor: Ghanta Chakrapani
- Location: Hyderabad, Telangana, India; 17.431584°N 78.3940344°E
- Campus: Urban
- Website: braou.ac.in

Dr. B.R. Ambedkar Open University, also known as Telangana Open University, formerly Andhra Pradesh Open University, is a public university in the city of Hyderabad, Telangana, India.

== History ==
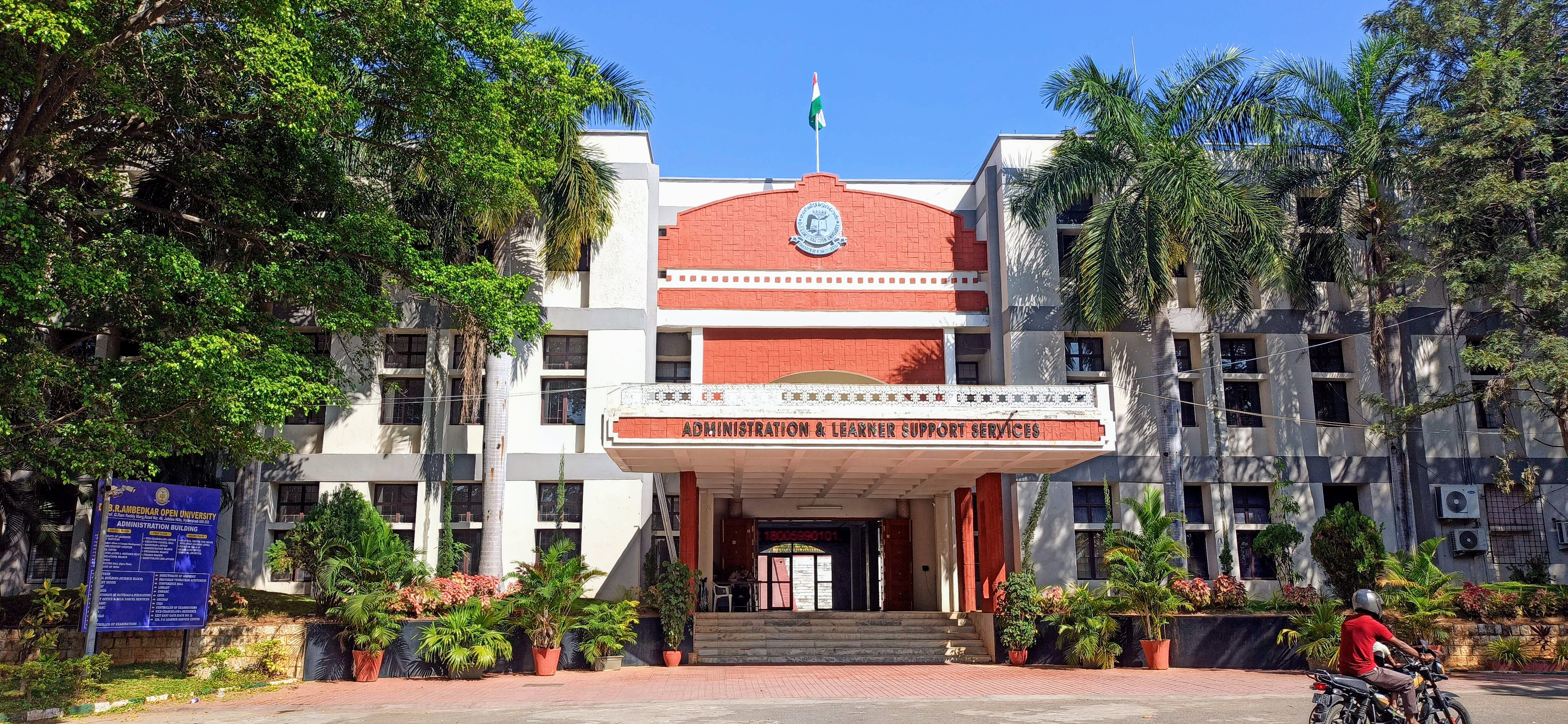
Dr. B.R. Ambedkar Open University

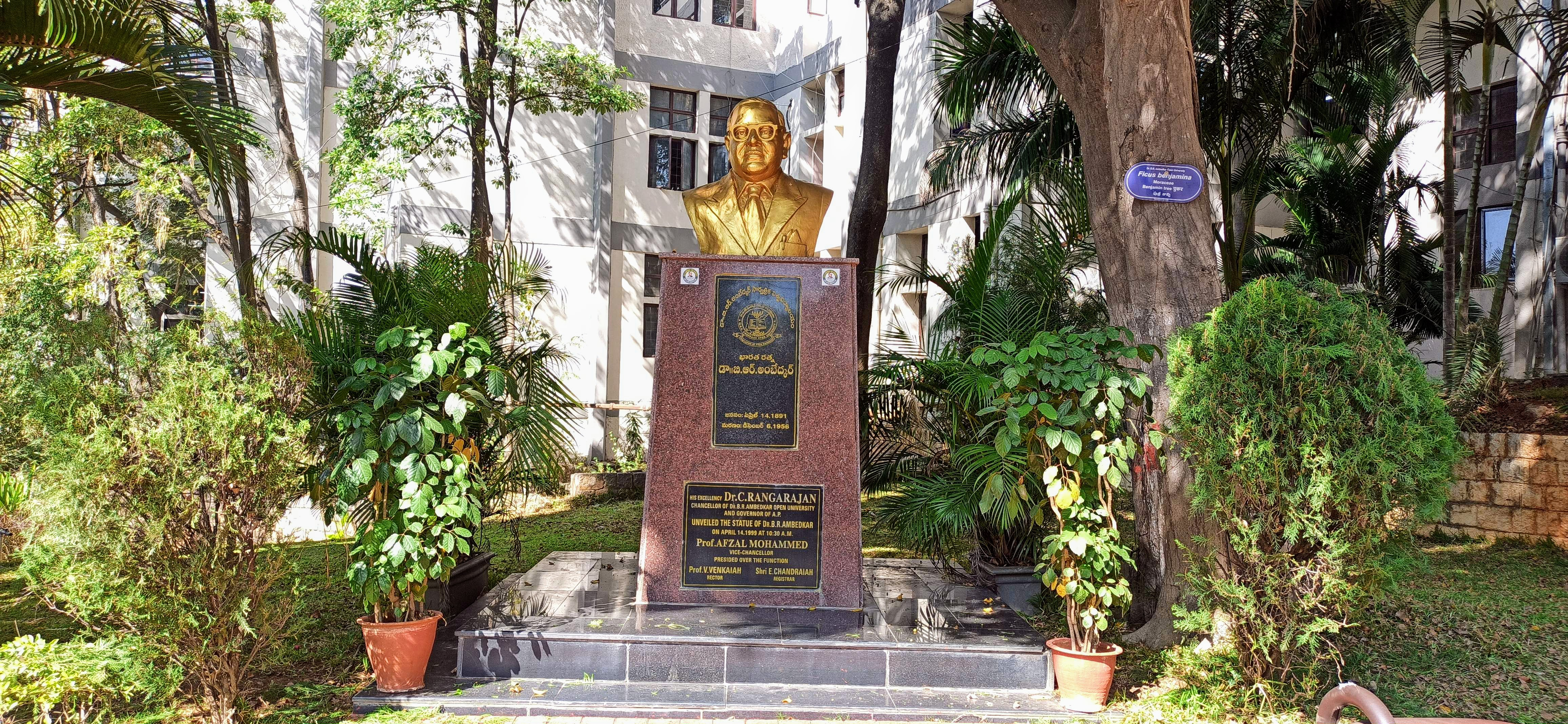
Dr. B.R. Ambedkar Open University

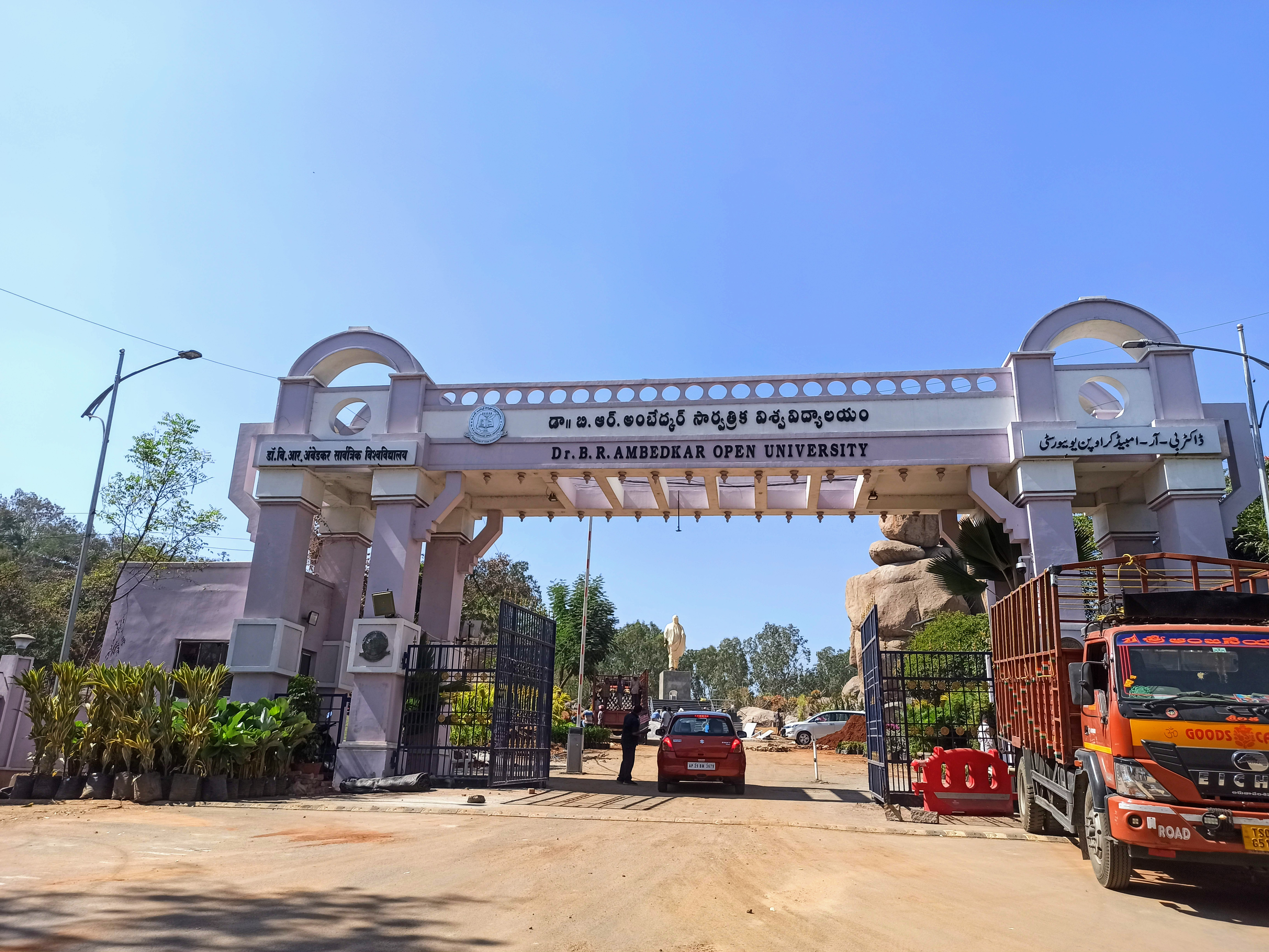
Dr. B.R. Ambedkar Open University

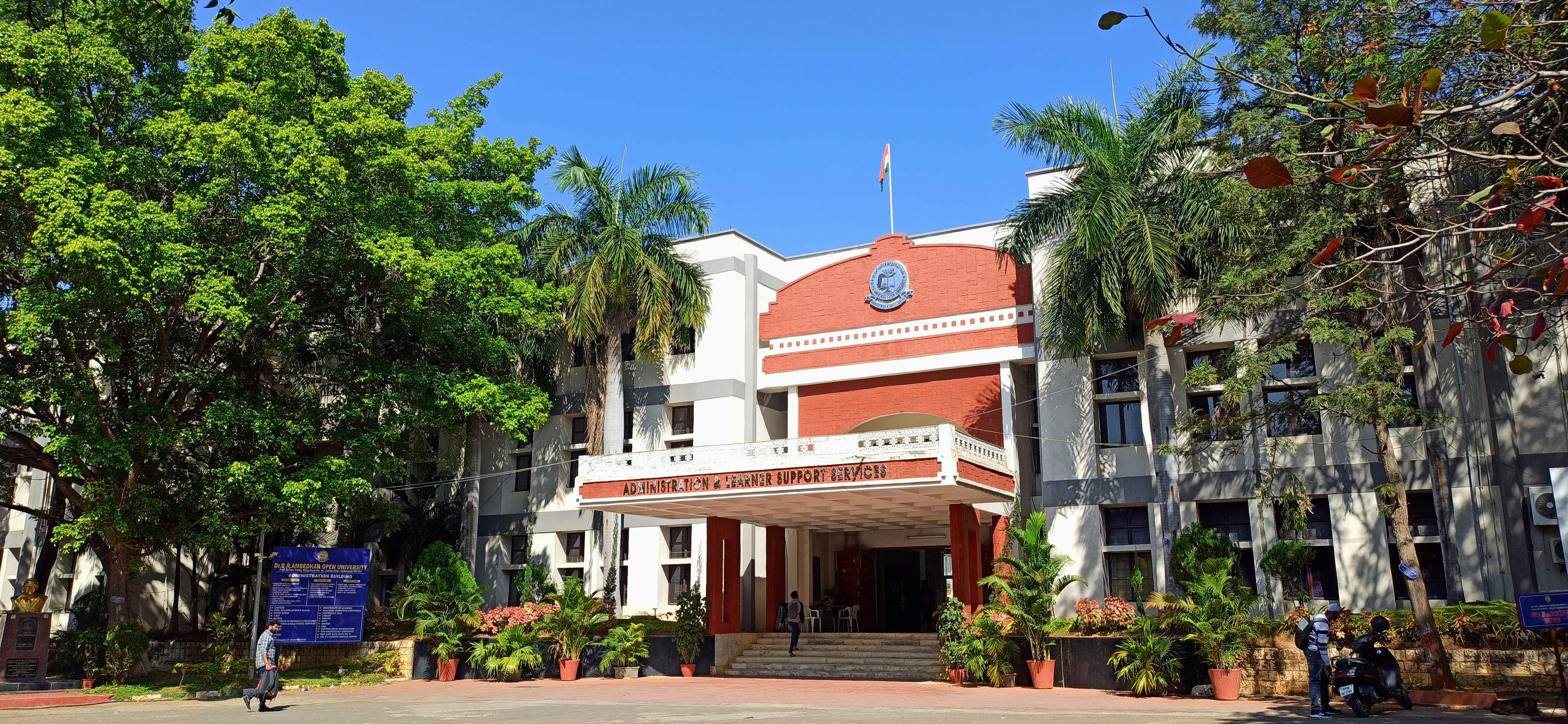
Dr. B.R. Ambedkar Open University

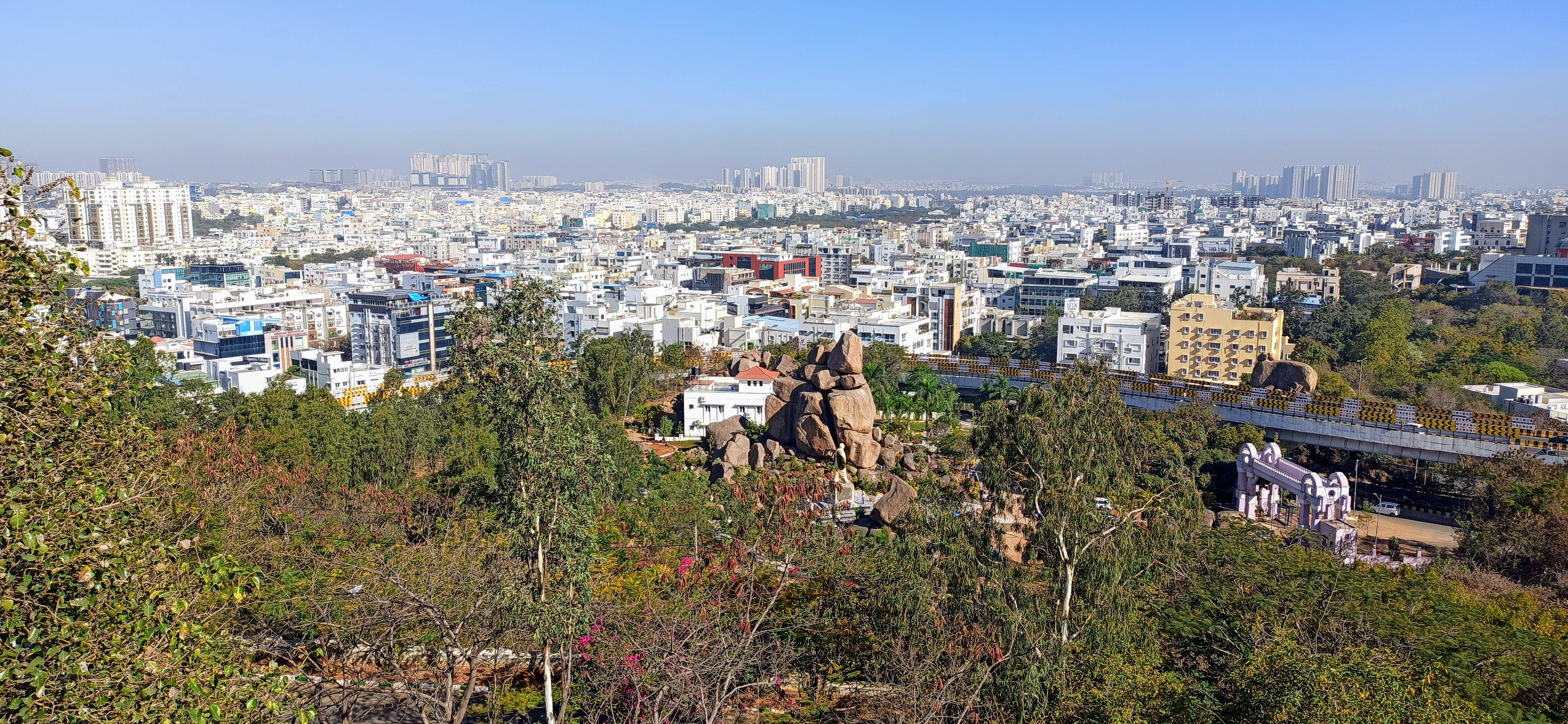
Aerial view

The university was established in 1982 as Andhra Pradesh Open University through the Andhra Pradesh Open University Act, 1982. It was inaugurated by the President of India. The founder and first vice chancellor (VC) was G. Ram Reddy. The university was renamed Dr. B.R. Ambedkar Open University in 1991 through the Andhra Pradesh Open University (Amendment) Act, 1991, named after the architect of the Indian Constitution Dr. Bhimrao Ramji Ambedkar on the occasion of the centenary of his birth.

After the bifurcation of Andhra Pradesh, the university figured in the tenth schedule of A.P. State Reorganisation Act, 2014, and shall continue providing equal facilities to people from both Andhra Pradesh and Telangana.

=== Vice chancellors ===
V. S. Prasad was appointed VC in 2001. P. Prakash was appointed in 2011. C. Parthasarathi was appointed VC in-charge in July 2019. Sita Rama Rao was appointed VC in 2021. Ghanta Chakrapani was appointed VC in 2024.

== See also ==
- List of universities in India
- Universities and colleges in India
- Education in India
- List of institutions of higher education in Telangana
