= SETWIN =

Organisation in Telangana to create employment opportunities

Society for Employment Promotion & Training in Twin Cities (SETWIN)
- SETWIN

Agency overview
- Formed: 1978
- Type: Department of Youth Services
- Jurisdiction: Telangana
- Headquarters: Azmath Jah palace No. 4, Purani Havelli, Hyderabad, India.
- Parent agency: Department of Youth Services, Government of Telangana
- Website: http://setwin.in

SETWIN, short for Society for Employment Promotion & Training in Twin Cities, is an organisation owned by Government of Telangana to create employment and self-employment opportunities to unemployed persons of twin cities of Hyderabad and Secunderabad by providing training in various courses at nominal fees.

== History ==
SETWIN was established on 15 August 1978. SETWIN was started under the patronage of Chief Minister Dr. Marri Channa Reddy with Khader Ali Khan as the first Chairman and Managing Director.

== Organisation ==
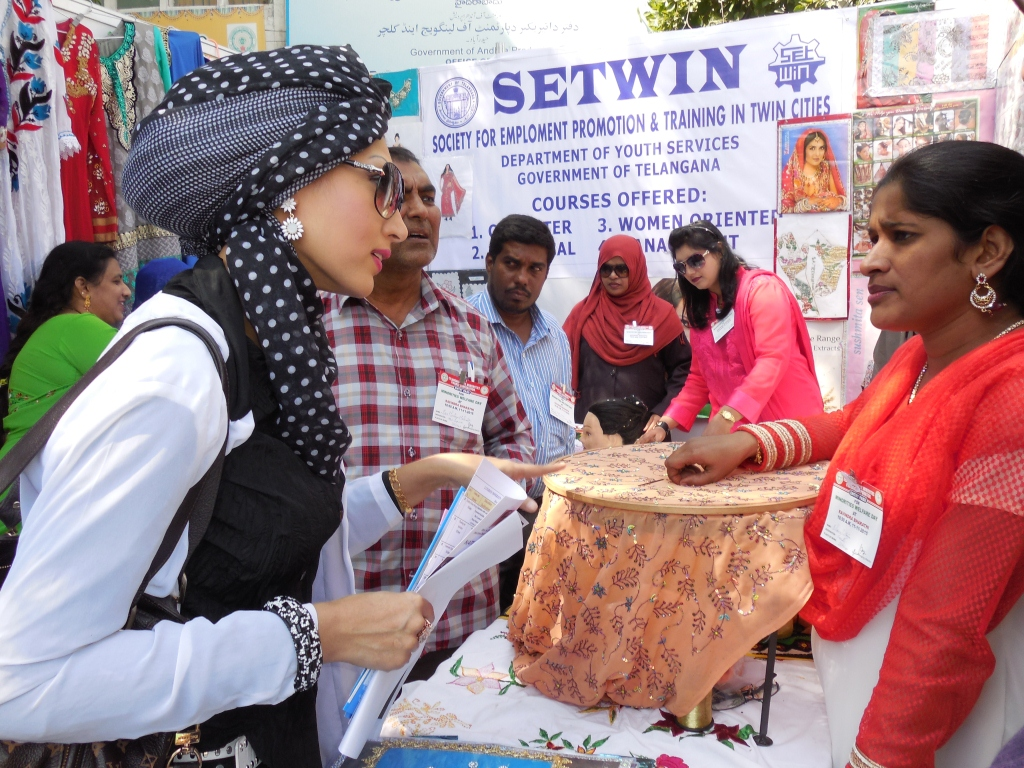
Sameera Aziz with SETWIN worker for a woman development programme

In addition to its centres, SETWIN operates various production units such as printing presses, cane weaving centres, book binding.

Since 2007 SETWIN has extended its services from Hyderabad to districts to improve self-employment opportunities in rural areas. The 32nd and 33rd training centres of SETWIN were inaugurated at APSP 10th Battalion, Mahaboobnagr District and 2nd Battalion at APSP, Kurnool District. In July 2015 SETWIN started the "Eeyoumin" scheme for students from poor minorities and as well providing placements to students who successfully complete their course and who enrol in the scheme. Students get free admission in the 16 different courses at different SETWIN training centres. This scheme was started by SETWIN in collaboration with the Department of Youth services and the Minority welfare department.

== Transport services ==
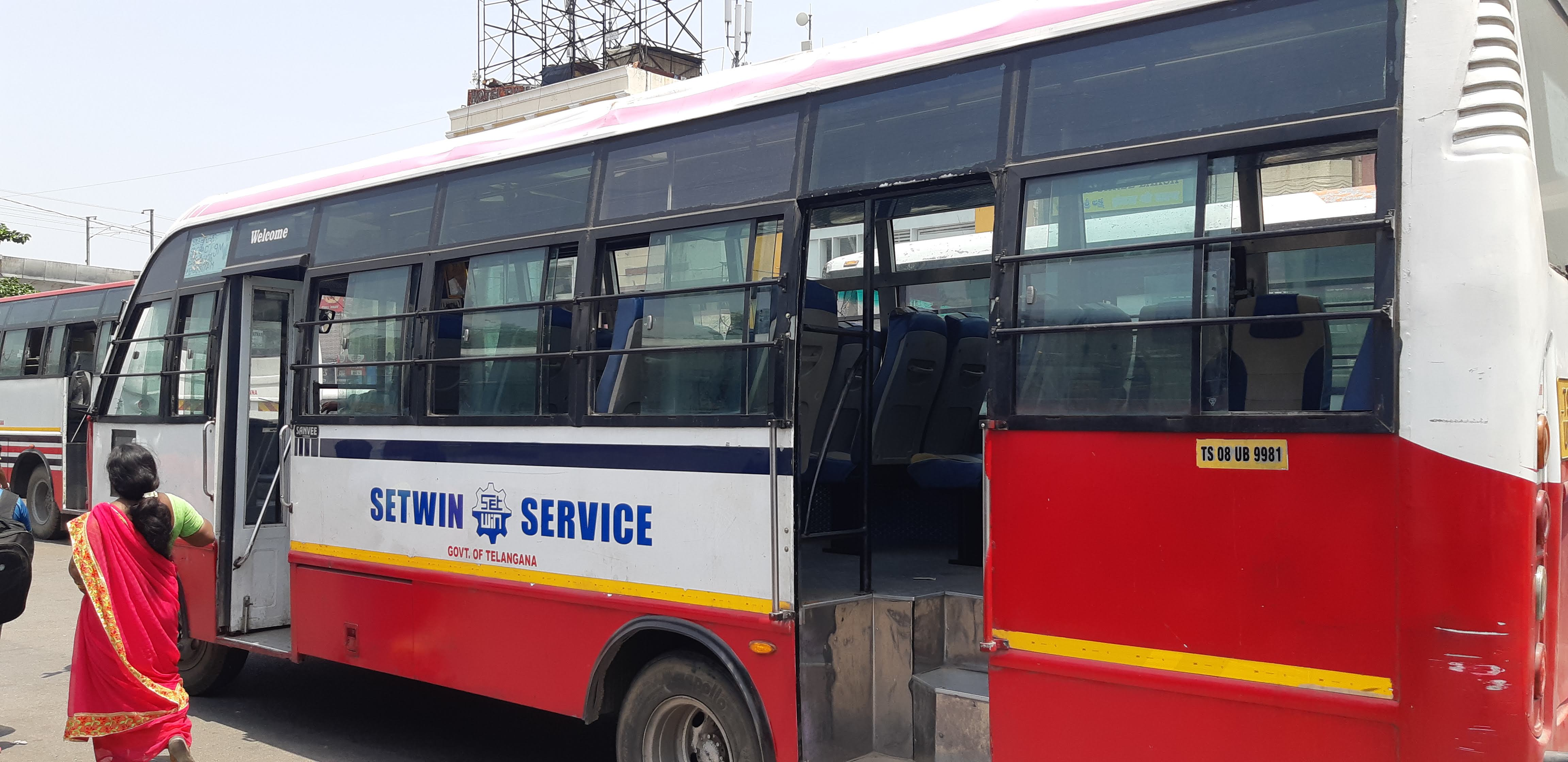
SETWIN bus in Secunderabad

In addition to providing training and operating various production units, SETWIN also operates minibuses to augment TSRTC services in Hyderabad. The SETWIN bus services were started in October 1979.

The SETWIN buses were stopped due to poor quality of buses and high accident rates. However, in 2006 the services were resumed.
