= Suggestion (magazine) =

New Thought magazine of suggestive therapeutics and psychology published in Chicago

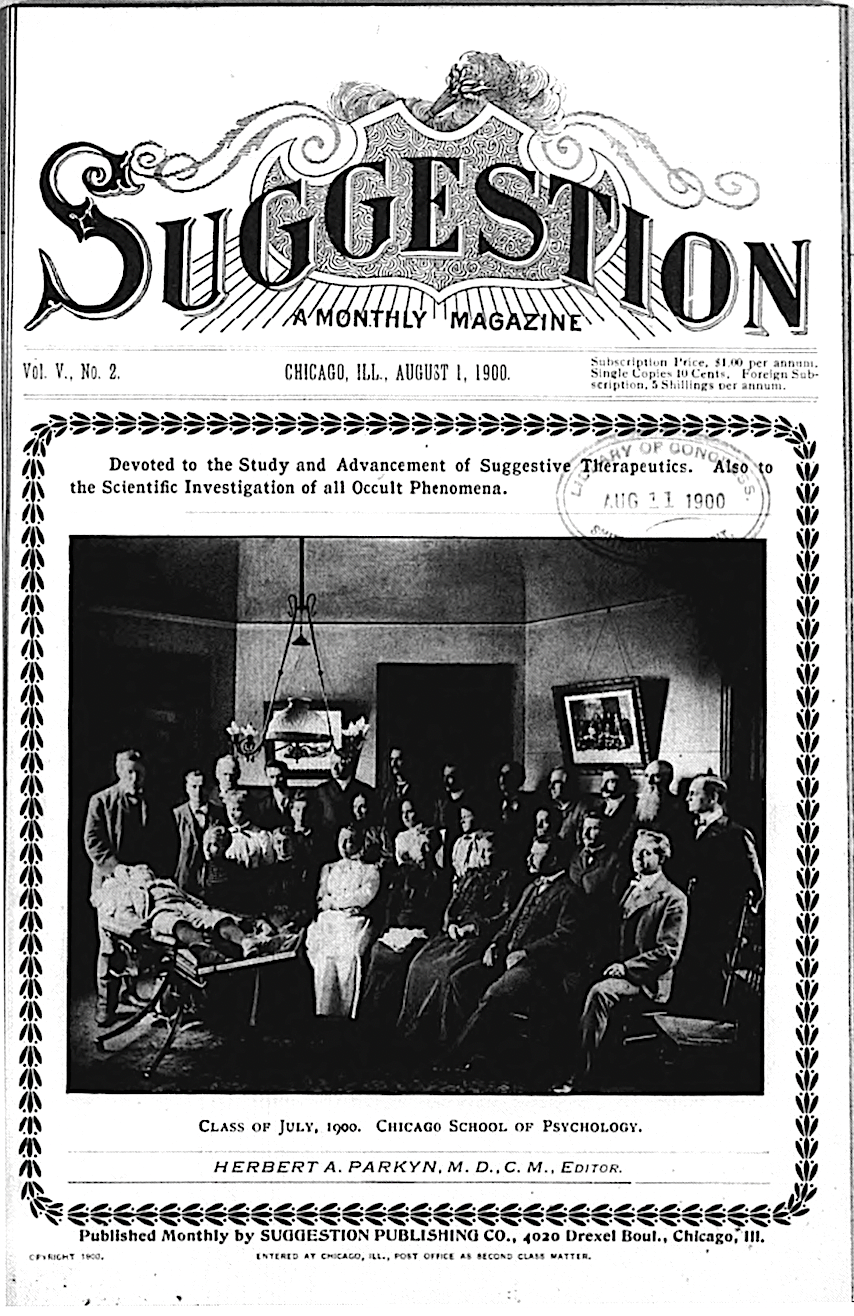
- Devoted to the study and advancement of Suggestive Therapeutics and the scientific investigation of all occult phenomena
- Editor: Herbert A. Parkyn
- Assistant Editor: William Walker Atkinson
- Assistant Editor: Elmer Ellsworth Carey
- Staff writers: William Xavier Sudduth, Stanley LeFevre Krebs, Edgar Lucien Larkin, Edwin Hartley Pratt. George Bieser, Charles Gilbert Davis, Scholey Fremont Meacham, Mary Scott Fielding
- Categories: Suggestive Therapeutics, New Thought, Occult Phenomena, Mental Science,
- Frequency: Monthly
- Founded: 1 August 1898
- Final issue: 1 November 1906
- Company: Suggestion Publishing Company
- Country: United States of America
- Based in: Chicago, Illinois, United States
- Language: English

Suggestion (1898-1906) was an American magazine of suggestive therapeutics and applied psychology published in Chicago at the turn of the twentieth century. It emerged from The Hypnotic Magazine and served as the principal publication associated with Herbert A. Parkyn and his Chicago School of Psychology.

It became a major influence on the New Thought movement by articulating a systematic, non-mystical framework for mind cure grounded in psychology, physiology, and clinical practice rather than religious doctrine. Through its consistent promotion of the "Law of Suggestion" as the governing principle behind mental influence, health, habit formation, and character development, Suggestion functioned as the primary source through which a medicalized understanding of mind cure circulated within New Thought. Its articles, terminology, and methods were widely echoed and reproduced in later journals, books, correspondence courses, and instructional systems created by graduates and affiliates of the Chicago School, extending the magazine’s influence well beyond its own publication run.

== Beginnings and development ==
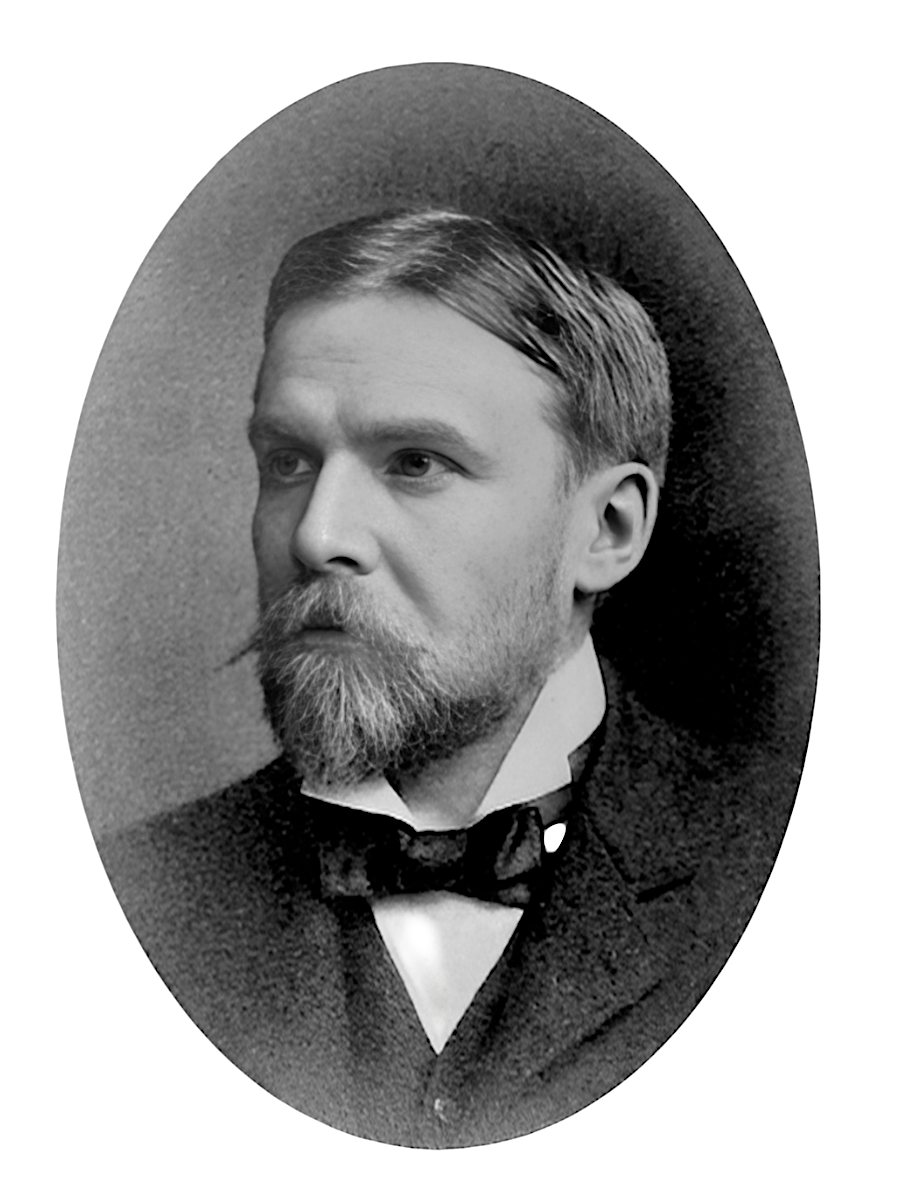
Herbert A Parkyn

Suggestion emerged from a coordinated publishing system developed by Herbert A. Parkyn to support the instructional and clinical work of his Chicago School of Psychology.

Parkyn was a physician and lecturer who specialized in suggestive therapeutics, a system that emphasized the therapeutic power of verbal and waking suggestion rather than reliance on drugs or deep hypnotic trance. In 1896 he founded the Chicago School as the first instructional institution in America dedicated to the systematic teaching of suggestion as a lawful psychological process. The school became the central hub of a growing network of affiliated Schools of Suggestive Therapeutics established by Parkyn and his graduates across the United States.

Rather than relying on popular "magazine medicine" or mass-market health periodicals, Parkyn deliberately created and controlled a sequence of professionally edited journals to document clinical results, present theoretical arguments, and standardize terminology. These publications were intended to distinguish his system from both theatrical hypnotism and sectarian healing movements, and to define suggestive therapeutics as a disciplined field grounded in psychology and medical practice.

=== The Hypnotic Magazine ===
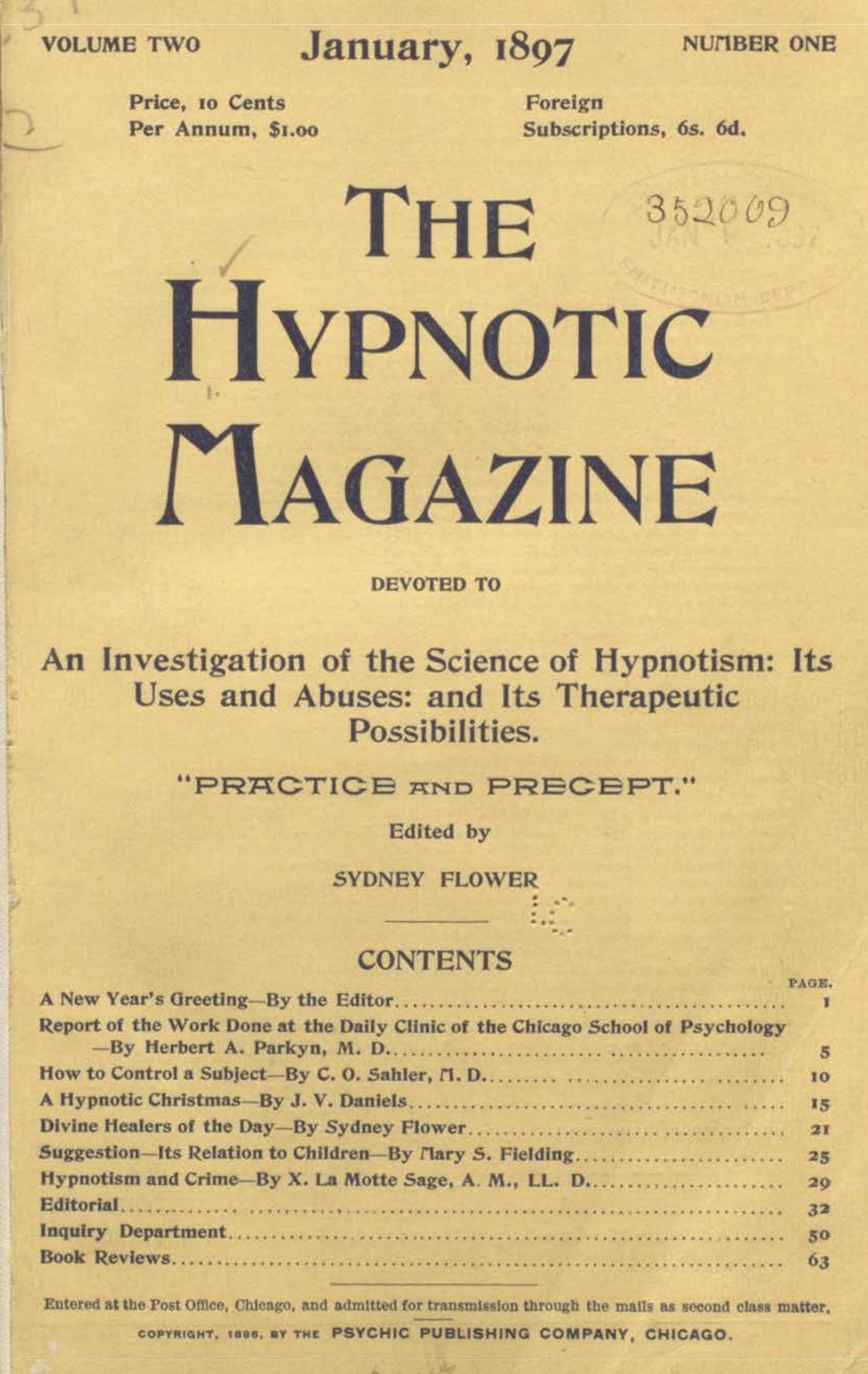
The Hypnotic Magazine

The first of these publications was The Hypnotic Magazine (August 1896 to December 1897), founded by Parkyn and Sydney B. Flower and published through their Psychic Publishing Company. Flower served as editor and Parkyn directed the philosophical and scientific content. The magazine functioned as the unofficial organ of the Chicago School and presented hypnotic suggestion as a clinical subject for serious medical and psychological investigation.

=== The Journal of Medical Hypnotism ===
In January 1898 the publication was renamed The Journal of Medical Hypnotism (January to May 1898). Parkyn and Flower made the change to distinguish their work from the growing number of untrained practitioners and stage performers who portrayed hypnotism as a mysterious, dangerous, or theatrical power. The new title was intended to identify the journal as a medical periodical devoted to legitimate therapeutic practice rather than entertainment or occult speculation.

=== Suggestive Therapeutics ===
In June 1898 the journal was renamed again as Suggestive Therapeutics (June 1898 to December 1900). This rebranding reflected Parkyn’s instructional emphasis on waking, verbal suggestion and aligned the publication with the expanding system of branded Schools of Suggestive Therapeutics opened by Parkyn and his graduates. Under this title, the magazine functioned as the unofficial organ of the affiliated schools and served as the central publication reporting on their activities and presenting the standardized method taught across the network.

== Suggestion magazine ==
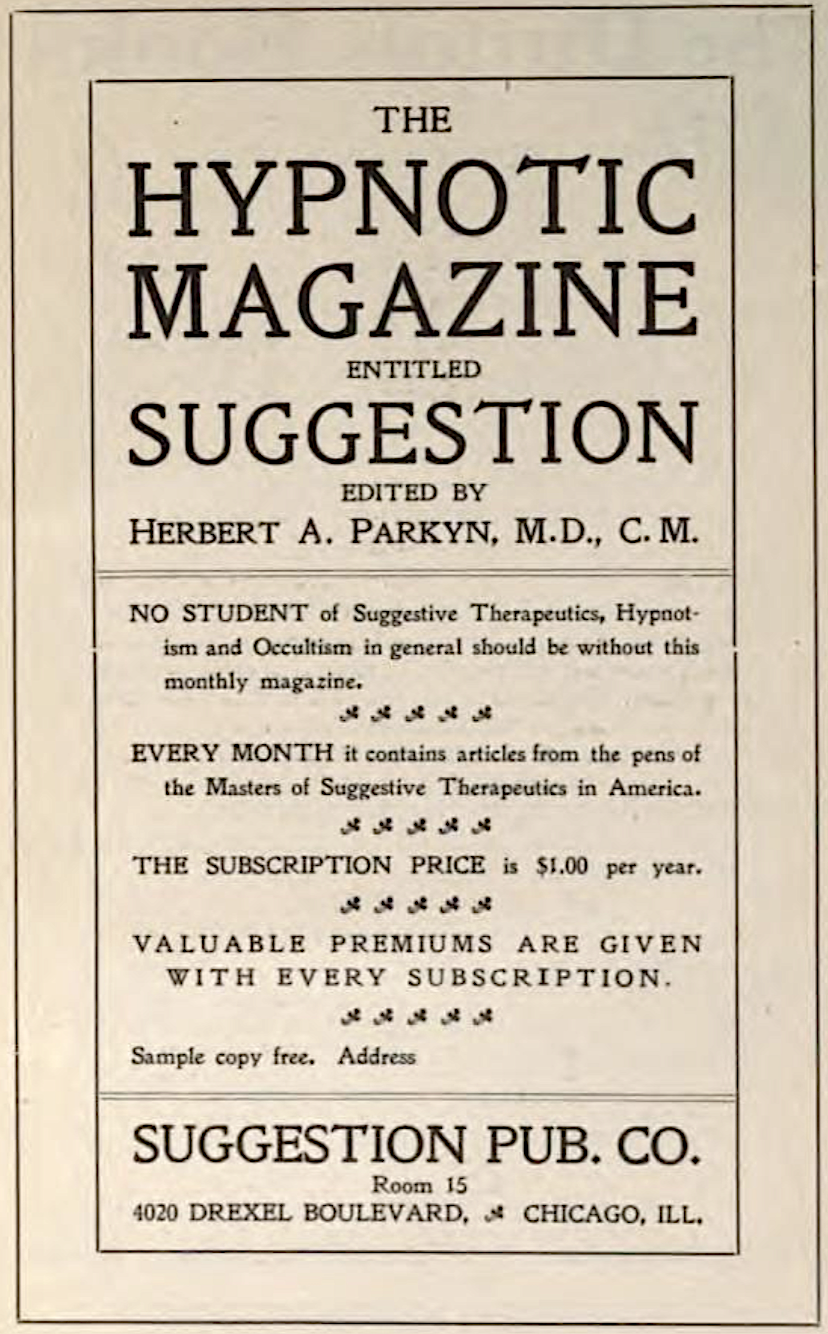
The Hypnotic Magazine becomes Suggestion magazine

While Suggestive Therapeutics served the affiliated schools, Parkyn launched a parallel Chicago-based journal in August 1898 titled Suggestions, later shortened to Suggestion, as the new organ of his Chicago School of Psychology. It was presented as the official continuation of The Hypnotic Magazine and featured what it termed "choice literary gems by the world's best known Mystics." Its stated purpose was to disseminate the most advanced ideas and experimental findings in the fields of "Suggestive Therapeutics, Hypnotism, Telepathy, Suggestive Education of Children, Dreams, Visions, and all Psychical Phenomena."

While acknowledging the crowded field of similar publications, Parkyn argued that most failed to grasp a true understanding of mental phenomena, stating that the boundary between natural and supernatural forces affecting the mind and body had yet to be clearly defined. Although many events commonly attributed to the supernatural could, in Parkyn's view, be explained by natural laws, he did not rule out the possibility that some phenomena were genuinely supernatural. He acknowledged the widespread interest in subjects such as telepathy, clairvoyance, mind reading, and crystal gazing as sufficient justification for a serious investigation, but pledged to exclude spiritism and spirit phenomena from its content.

From its inception, the magazine quickly established itself as the foremost journal for serious, scientifically grounded exploration of the mental sciences. It featured contributions from many of the leading thinkers in mental science and related fields of esoteric research including, Thomson Jay Hudson, William Walker Atkinson, George W. Carey, William James, Stanley LeFevre Krebs, Henry Harrison Brown, Edwin Hartley Pratt, Elmer R. Gates, William Xavier Sudduth, Frank Channing Haddock, Isaac Newton Vail, Edgar L. Larkin, A. Victor Segno, and many more.

== Mission and the New Psychology ==
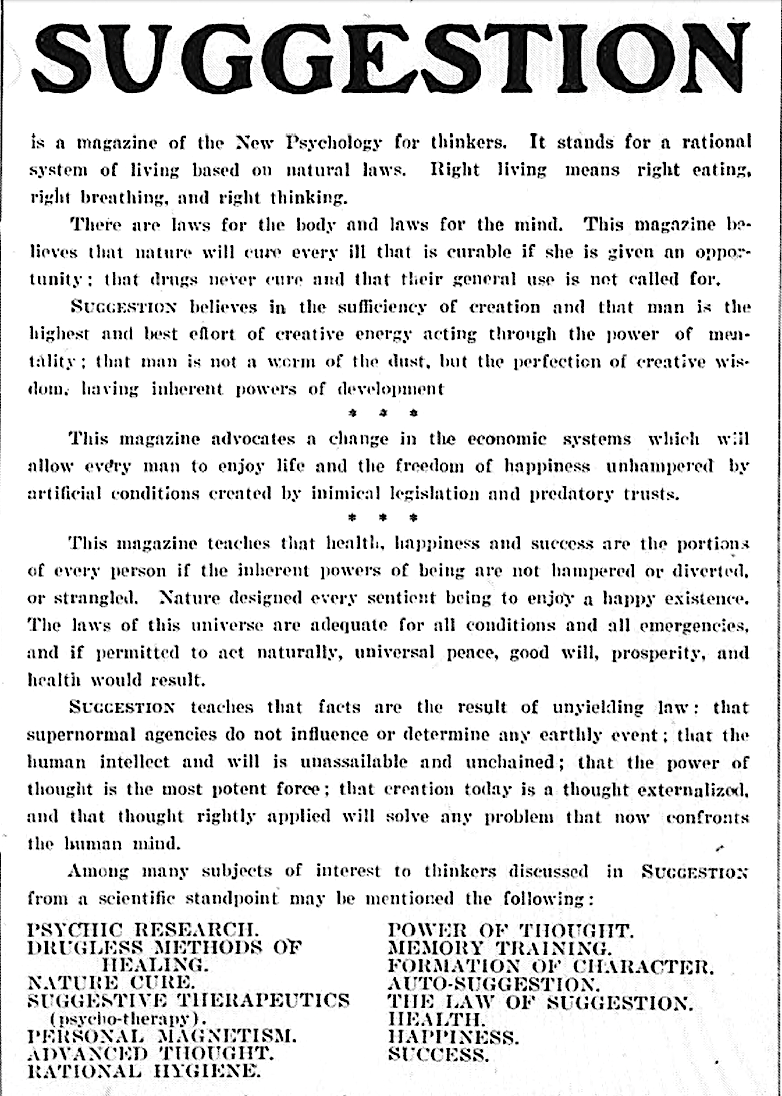
Suggestion Magazine's mission statement

Suggestion defined its mission as the promotion of a "New Psychology" grounded in natural law and rational inquiry. The magazine asserted that life was governed by fixed laws of mind and body and that health, happiness, and success depended on understanding and obeying those laws. It identified right living as the combined practice of right thinking, right breathing, and right eating, with mental causation presented as the primary force shaping both physical conditions and personal experience.

The magazine explicitly denied that spiritism, mediumship, or supernormal agencies influenced earthly events, insisting instead on the sovereignty of human intellect and will. It argued that facts were the result of unyielding law, that thought was the most powerful force in existence, and that creation itself was the outward expression of thought. Disease, failure, and distress were described as results of violated law rather than mystery or fate, and drug-based medicine was portrayed as mostly interfering with nature rather than producing cures.

At the core of the New Psychology was the belief that every individual possessed inherent powers of development. Humanity was described as the highest expression of creative energy acting through mentality, endowed with the capacity to cultivate health, character, and achievement through conscious control of thought. The magazine taught that worry, fear, doubt, sickness, and failure could be banished by understanding mental law, and that optimism, personal magnetism, self-control, and will power could be deliberately developed.

Suggestion also extended its psychological doctrine into ethical, social, and economic domains. It advocated changes to economic systems that it argued restricted natural happiness through artificial legislation and predatory monopolies. The magazine asserted that nature designed every sentient being for a happy existence and that, if mental and natural laws were allowed to operate freely, peace, good will, prosperity, and health would follow on both personal and collective levels.

== The "Occult World" column and the "Astra" pseudonym ==
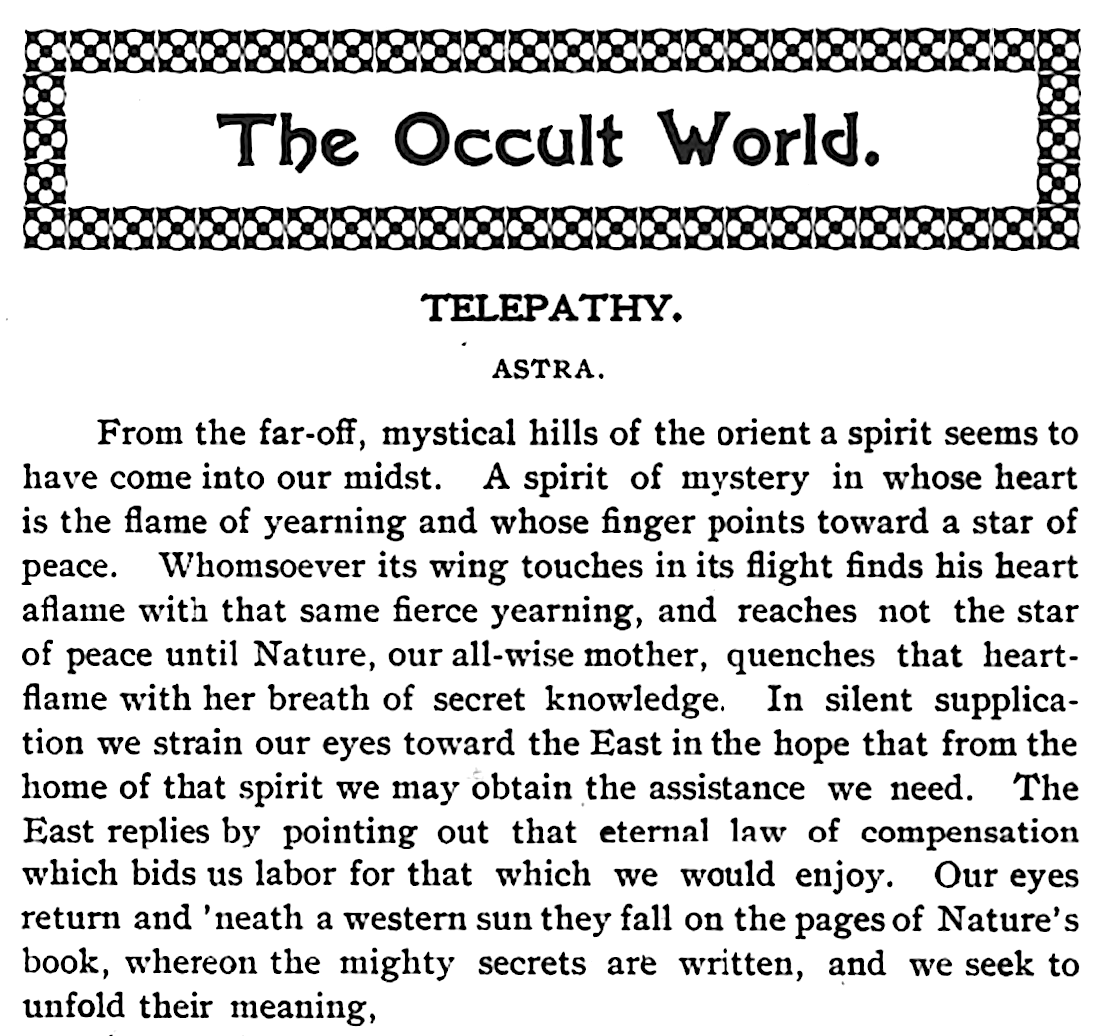
"The Occult World" department authored by Astra. In the very first issue of his magazine, Parkyn gives an invocation for the secrets of the ancient Orient to open its mysteries to the Western eyes.

A special section of Suggestions magazine titled "Occult World" was introduced by Parkyn to serve as an anonymous outlet for exploring subjects that traditional medical circles considered controversial or unscientific. Articles in this section were attributed to the anonymous pseudonym "Astra," a Sanskrit term used in Hindu and Hermetic traditions. This anonymous section allowed Dr. Parkyn to write and publish material on the occult, supernatural phenomena, or experimental mind research without risking professional backlash. In the first five issues of the magazine, the Astra articles formed a five part serialized investigation into the ancient Hindu history of Yogis having the power of telepathy and the possibilities that it is a law of nature. This demonstrated Parkyn’s clear intention for the magazine to act as a platform for a serious inquiry into this area.

Parkyn was deeply influenced in his study of yogic and Eastern mental traditions by M. H. Lackersteen, who had grown up in Calcutta and served for fifteen years as Surgeon-Major in the British Army in India during the Sepoy mutiny. Lackersteen moved to Chicago in the 1880s and was a key figure, along with his close friend, Jenkin Lloyd Jones, in organizing the Parliament of World's Religions at the 1893 Chicago World's Fair. Lackersteen was one of the most prominent physicians in Chicago and had a lifelong interest in hypnotism and became an early and influential supporter of Parkyn, acting as one of his strongest advocates in the city.He helped secure the location for the Chicago School and lived next door. After Lackersteen’s death in 1897, Parkyn’s adoption of the Astra pseudonym in 1898 served as a means of publishing Lackersteen’s ideas on Eastern mental philosophy

=== Astra and the principle of psychic projection or telepathy ===
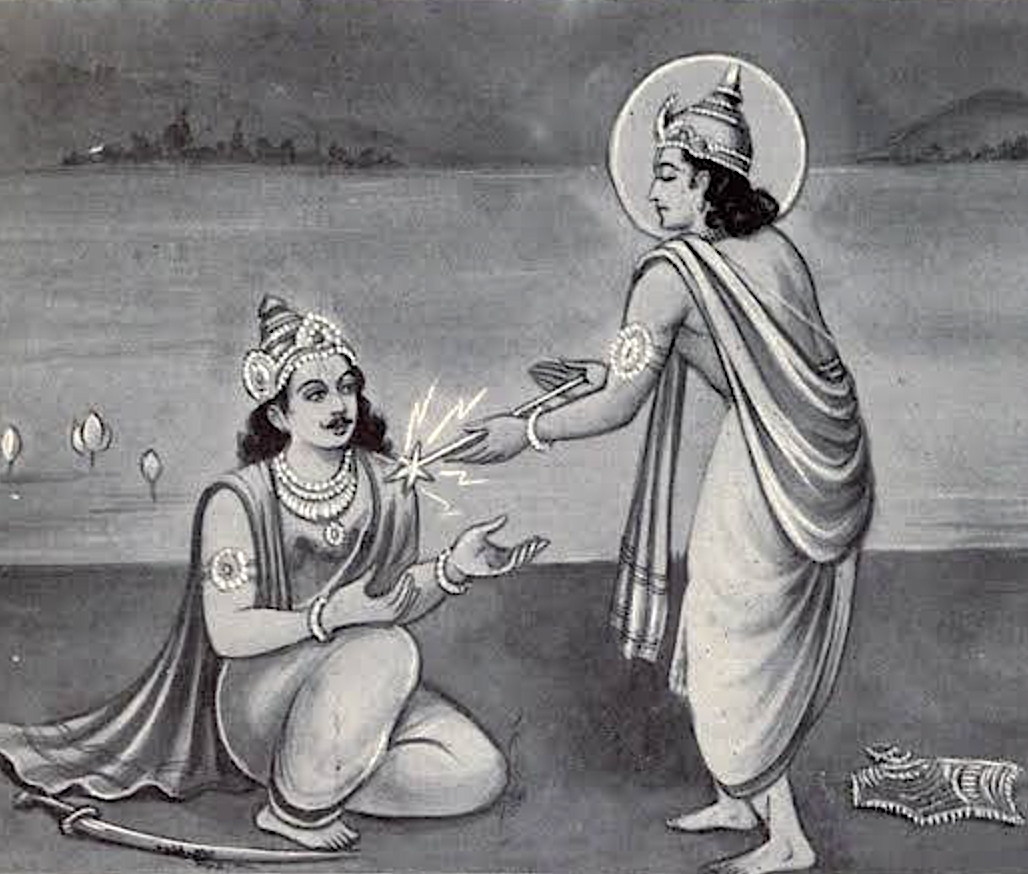
A depiction of the god Indra giving his divine Astra weapon, Indrashakti, to the warrior Karna.

Parkyn's choice of using the name Astra as the pseudonym for the author of the "Occult World" department in Suggestion magazine was selected with intention. The term carries a long history of meaning in Sanskrit and in esoteric tradition. Formed from the Sanskrit root "As", meaning "to throw" or "to project," and the suffix "-tra," meaning "instrument," the word translates to a "projection instrument." Just as mantra is the "thought instrument" and yantra the "control instrument", in Hindu epics astra is the instrument of projection.

In the Hindu epic traditions the astra is not simply a physical weapon but is empowered by the will, activated by mantra, and directed by intention. To release an astra is to harness word and thought and project it outward as energy. Its esoteric meaning is the principle that mind and will can extend beyond the body. Thought, word, and intention become forces that move outward like rays. In this sense an astra is a psychic or telepathic projection, a current of subtle energy launched from within the practitioner out into the world.

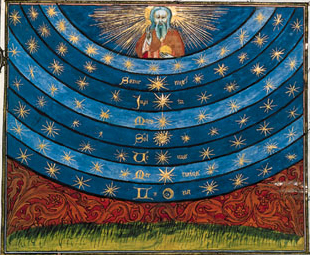
"Astra" was used as a term in esoteric and Hermetic traditions for the projection of divine thought, as it reflected through the seven astral planes into forms the human mind can grasp.

In Western esoteric traditions astra, came to be understood as the projection of thought and was seen as a force that could be directed outward from the mind. The medium of this projection was called the astral plane, the subtle realm that lies between spirit and matter. In this framework the astra is the ray of mental intention sent forth, and the astral plane is the field through which it travels, carrying the influence of mind beyond the limits of the body.

Writing as Astra, Parkyn traced telepathy to ancient Hindu yogic practices, in which adepts were said to transmit vivid mental impressions directly from one mind to another without sensory mediation. He presented these traditions as early empirical observations of a latent human faculty, later rediscovered and partially validated by Western research, particularly that of the Society for Psychical Research. The series argues that emotional bonds, heightened states of consciousness, and extreme circumstances allow the mind to bypass the physical senses and communicate directly with another. It closes with a strong challenge to the scientific orthodoxy arguing that the weight of documented cases had grown too large to dismiss, and that true progress in psychology would depend on taking these "occult" phenomena seriously.

== William Walker Atkinson joins Suggestion ==
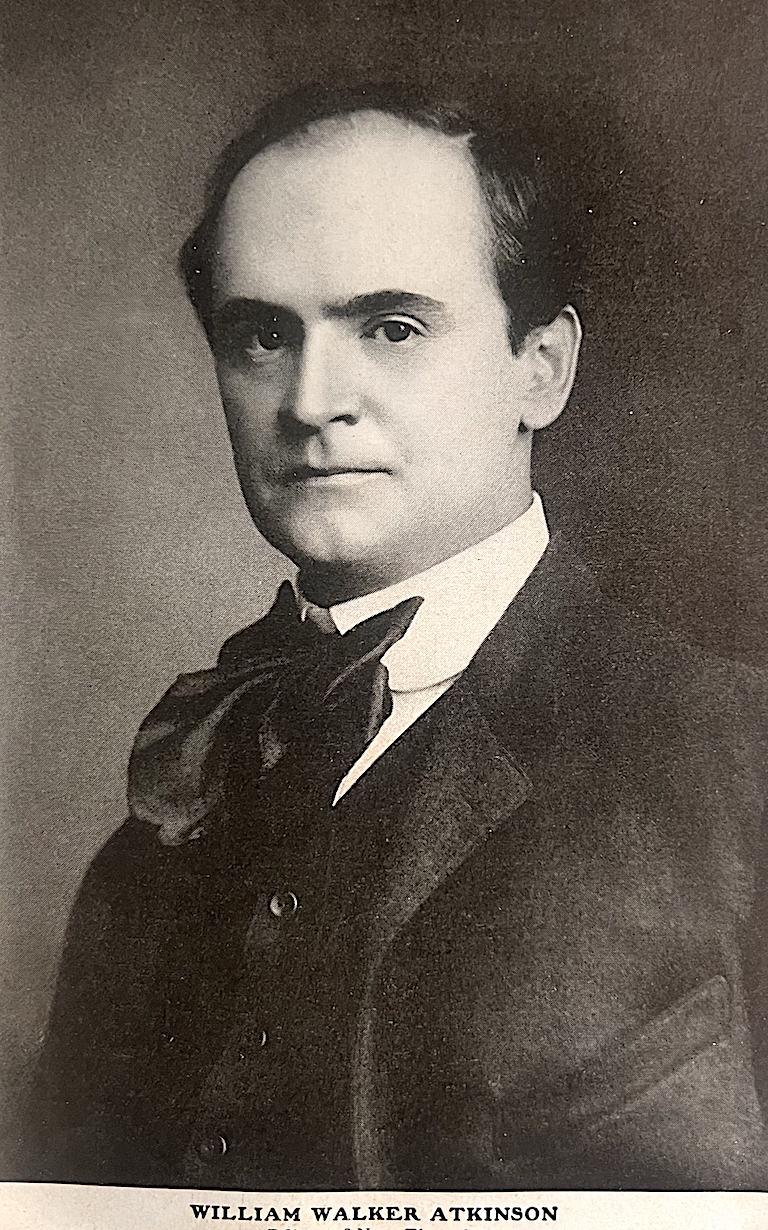
Herbert A. Parkyn's protégé, William Walker Atkinson, in 1901

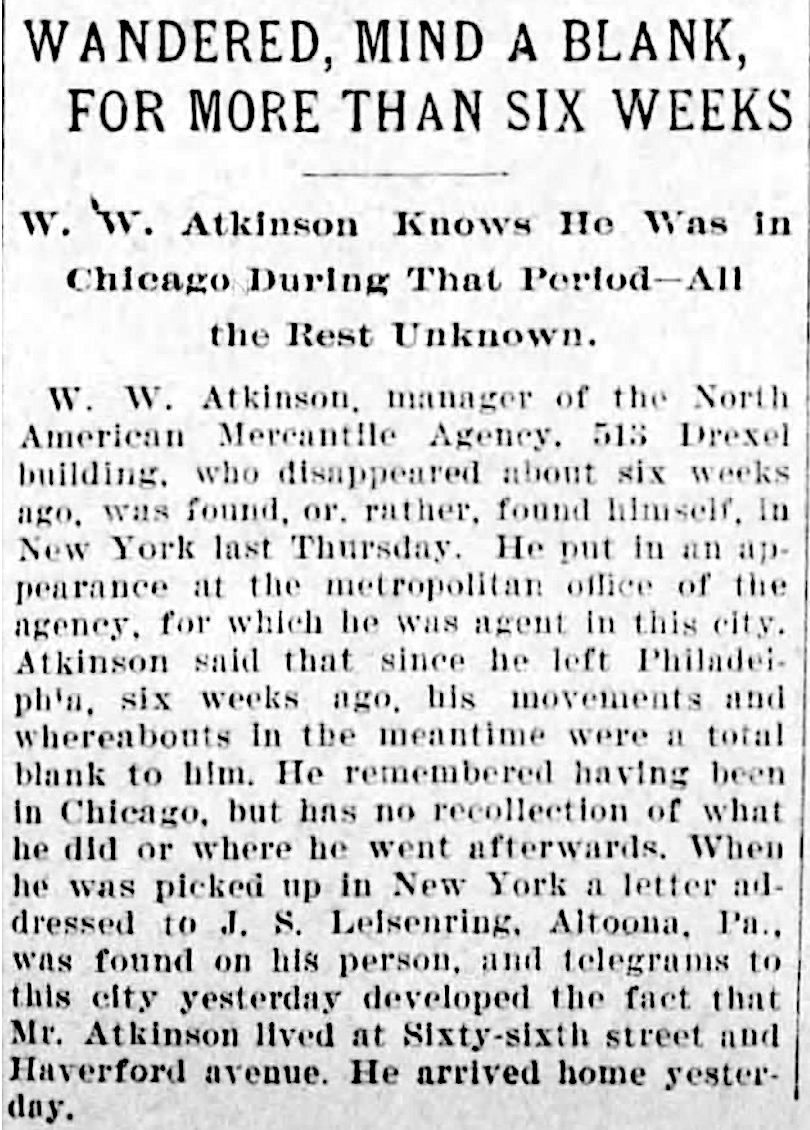
William Walker Atkinson located

William Walker Atkinson became involved with Parkyn in the spring of 1900, when he arrived at the Chicago School of Psychology seeking mental th-erapy. Atkinson was suffering from nervous prostration attributed to strain arising from difficulties in his legal career in Philadelphia. He had disappeared without explanation from his family and work and traveled to Chicago, where he remained for six weeks under Parkyn’s care. Upon his reappearance, he told the press that he had no clear recollection of his whereabouts during his absence, apart from a vague impression of having been in Chicago. Shortly thereafter, Atkinson relocated permanently to Chicago with his wife and child.

Following his move, Atkinson spent several months studying directly under Parkyn. During this time, Atkinson underwent full training in Parkyn’s system of suggestive therapeutics and became aligned with the broader effort to establish the legitimacy of the Law of Suggestion. His background in legal debates as an attorney, combined with strong writing and organizational skills, led Parkyn to invite him to contribute to Suggestion.

=== Atkinson contributes unsigned editorial pieces to Suggestion ===
Over several months, Parkyn gradually introduced a more metaphysical interpretation of the mental sciences into the magazine through the writings of Atkinson, assigning him unsigned editorial pieces that integrated his voice into the journal. Parkyn positioned Atkinson as a strategic addition to the broader effort to extend suggestive therapeutics into everyday life. In addition to being an effective writer who attributed personal benefit to Parkyn’s methods, Atkinson brought professional experience in corporate law and financial risk assessment.

.

=== Atkinson's first published work on New Thought ===
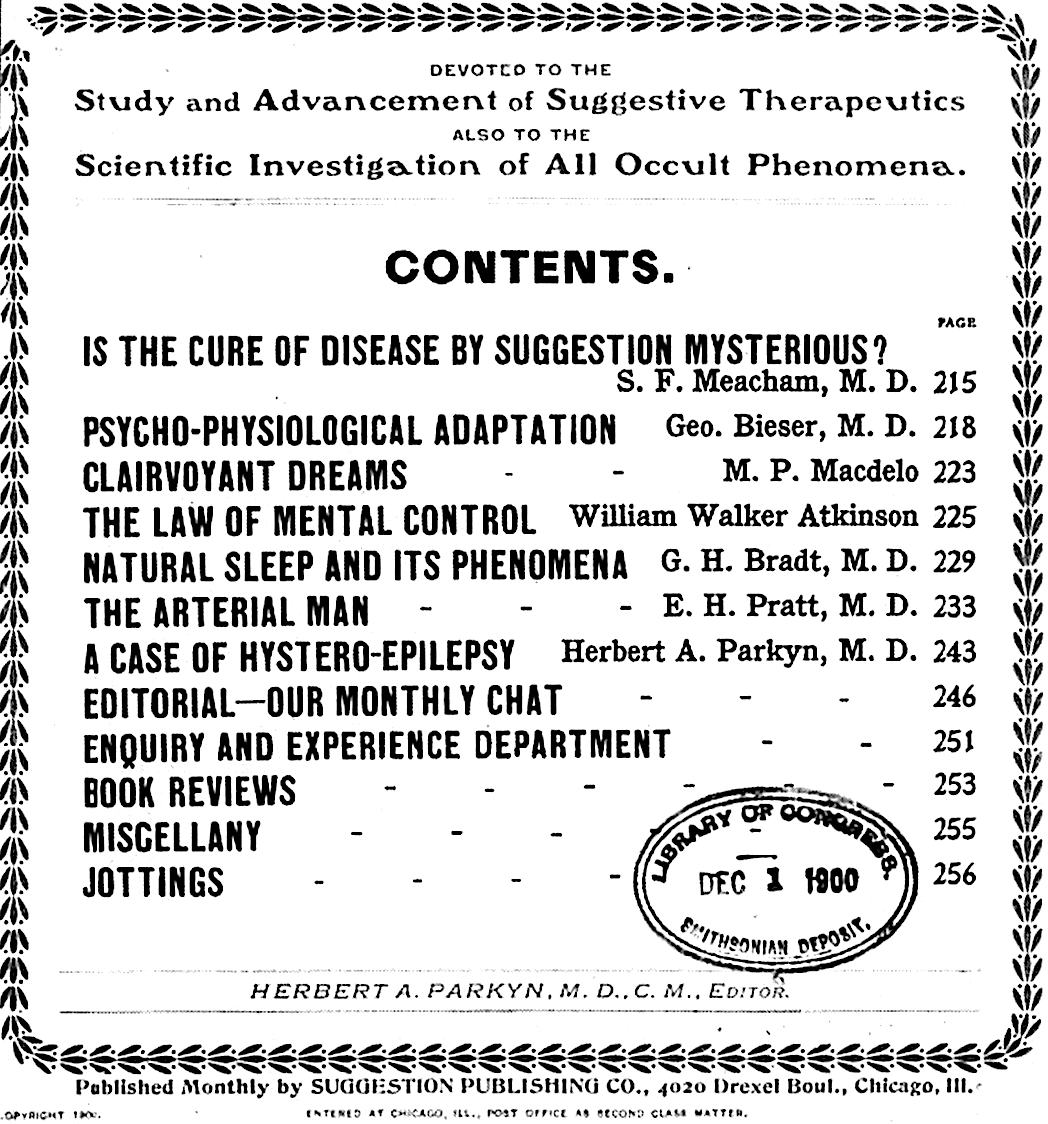
Suggestion December 1900 with the first ever published New Thought writing of William Walker Atkinson.

In December 1900, Atkinson's first published work on New Thought appeared in Suggestion magazine under the title "The Law of Mental Control." This would be a series of four articles with the titles "The Functions of the Mind," "The Real Self," "Character Building by Mental Control," and "I Can and I Will." This series presented Parkyn's main concepts behind the field of suggestive therapeutics and would soon be expanded into the book, A Series of Lessons in Personal Magnetism, Psychic Influence, Thought-Force, Concentration, Will-Power and Practical Mental Science. The ideas in this series and the following book created the foundation for the teachings and methods that would define Atkinson's writing career, and was the key to his rise to prominence within the New Thought movement.

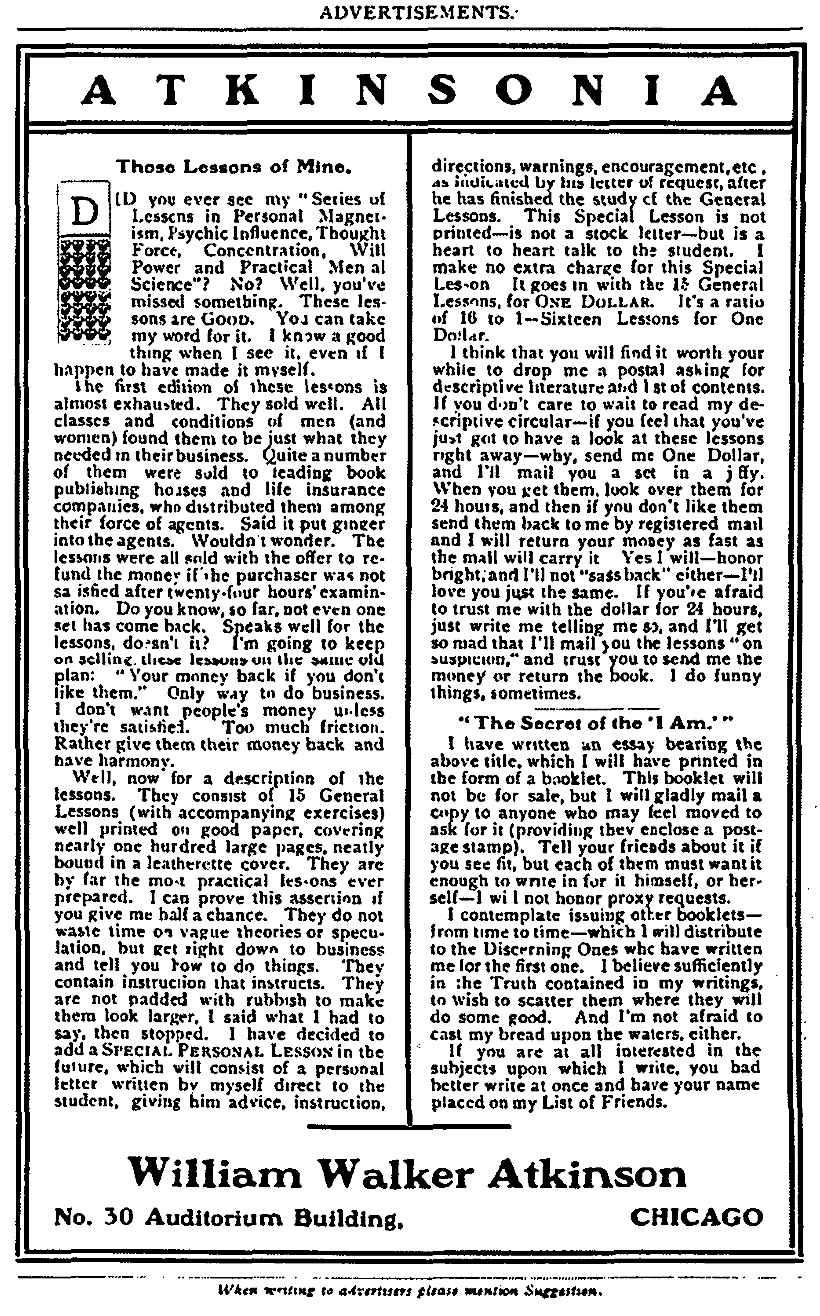
Atkinsonia ad in Suggestion

Atkinson’s role in Suggestion formed part of Parkyn’s broader strategy to shift the presentation of the Law of Suggestion from a strictly medical framework into broader everyday applications while adapting its language to audiences drawn to metaphysical ideas. As the New Thought movement increasingly adopted occult and esoteric terminology, Parkyn sought to preserve his standing within medical and psychological circles by keeping his therapeutic practice distinct from metaphysical rhetoric. Atkinson was therefore tasked with teaching Parkyn’s Law of Suggestion and extending its application beyond clinical treatment into self-culture, thought-force, and psychic phenomena, presenting the system in terms familiar to metaphysically inclined readers. In doing so, he translated suggestive therapeutics into the language of New Thought while directing that audience toward methods Parkyn regarded as disciplined, rational, and demonstrable rather than speculative or sensational..

=== Atkinsonia ===
In February 1901, Atkinson formally assumed the title of associate editor. During his year and half tenure at Suggestion, Parkyn framed Atkinson’s presence within the magazine as part of a distinct New Thought voice, promoting what Parkyn termed as "Atkinsonia." This branding presented Atkinson's contributions as a defined intellectual current within the journal, cultivating an atmosphere that suggested participation in a specialized body of New Thought teaching.

Through Suggestion's wide-reaching promotional campaigns highlighting Atkinson’s lectures, courses, and books, Parkyn successfully established Atkinson as a prominent figure within the mental science and New Thought community. Suggestion's strong editorial influence across the psychical science press further elevated Atkinson to a position of leadership that other journals respected and emulated.

In November 1901, Parkyn brought Atkinson together with his longtime protege, Sydney B. Flower, to establish New Thought magazine as a successor to Suggestive Therapeutics, which had ceased publication after postal authorities revoked its second-class mailing privileges. The new journal would shift emphasis from clinical instruction to the metaphysical and philosophical foundations of the mental sciences, presenting its material in the language of the New Thought movement.

== Suggestion's playful exchanges with Elizabeth Towne of The Nautilus ==
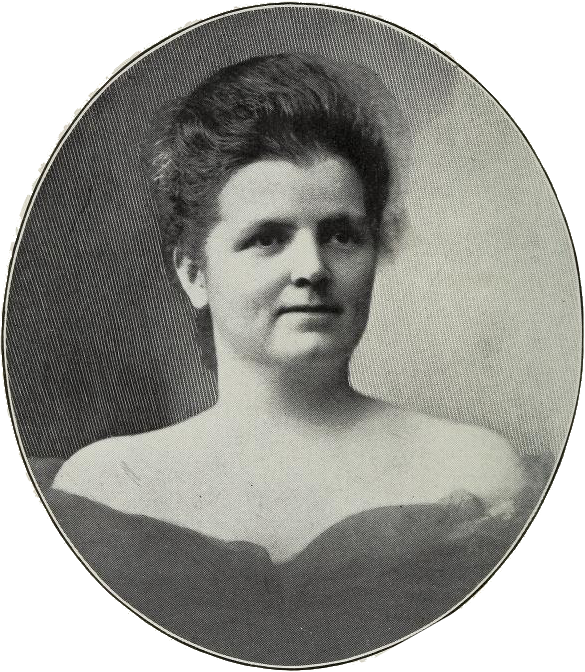
Elizabeth Towne, editor of The Nautilus

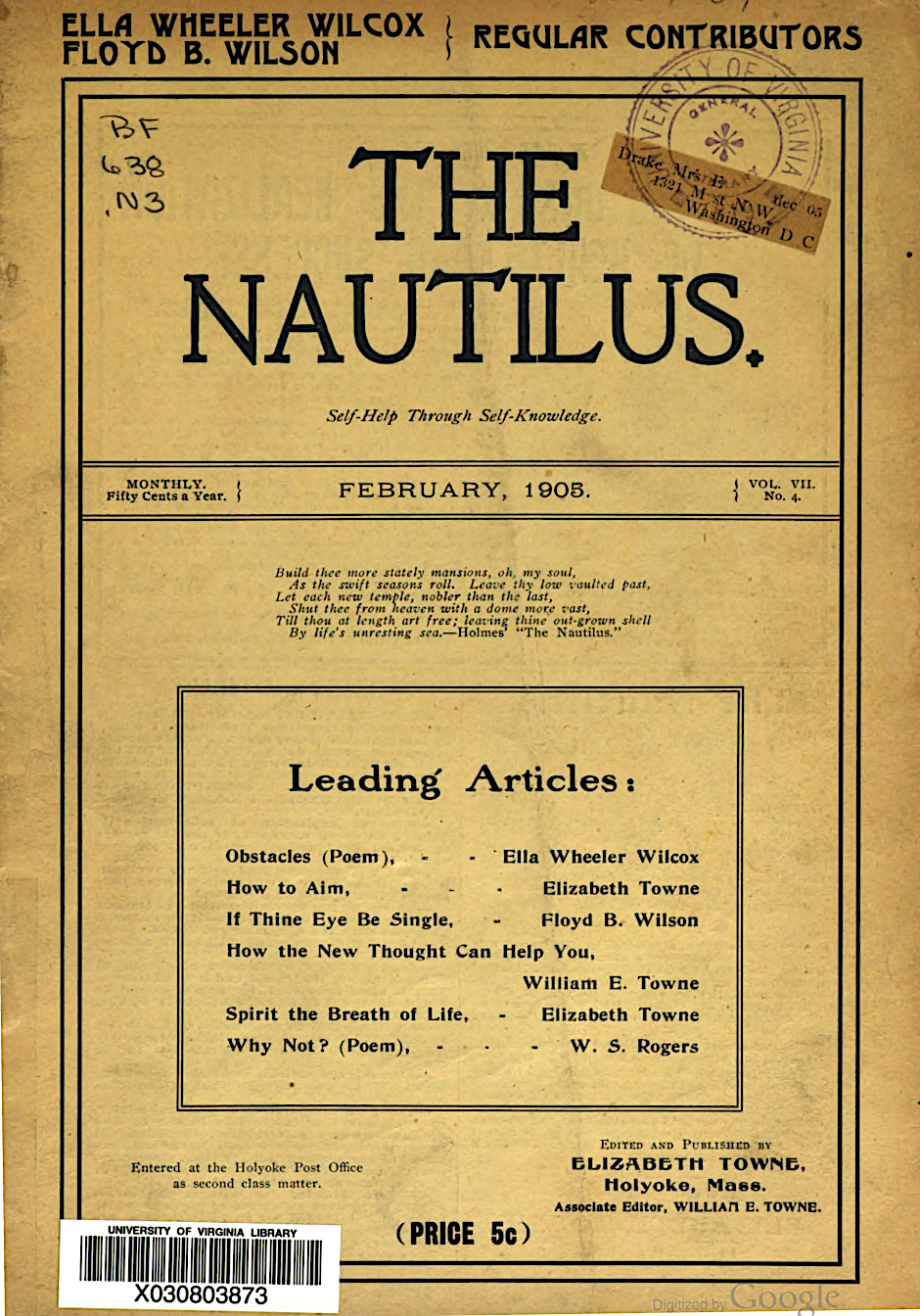
The Nautilus February 1905

Among the New Thought journals of the period, Suggestion maintained an active and at times playful exchange with The Nautilus, edited and published by Elizabeth Towne. Towne had founded The Nautilus in 1898 in Portland, Oregon, beginning as a four-page pamphlet before relocating to Holyoke, Massachusetts, where she expanded its circulation and influence within the New Thought community with the assistance of her husband, William E. Towne.

The interaction between Towne and Parkyn began publicly in December 1900, when Parkyn responded in Suggestion to an article Towne had published the previous month in The Nautilus. In that piece, Towne challenged Parkyn’s assertion that so-called "Divine Healers" merely "masked" suggestive therapeutics under religious or philosophical terminology. She replied that Parkyn himself "forgets the bread pills or quinine he has masked his own suggestions with," arguing that so long as suggestion reached the patient, the cure followed regardless of the form or "mask" employed.

In his humorous editorial reply, Parkyn introduced her as "a spark producer without a doubt," whose journal was "one of the liveliest sheets that comes this way," and who "says what she pleases, without asking anyone’s permission." He noted that even after finding a soulmate, she remained "as vigorous and skittish as ever." He teased her about her Success Circle and wondered if perhaps it was her influence that had brought Suggestion such good fortune. He also poked fun at her declaration that "I AM every day quieting more storms than you can shake a stick at," adding a warning to her husband that he hoped she couldn’t start storms at home as well. Parkyn admitted that after reading her article, he felt quite uneasy about the strength of Elizabeth’s vibrations, until she mailed him a copy of her book Just How to Wake the Solar Plexus, along with a note suggesting she didn’t truly "have it in for us."

In February 1901, Parkyn published a warm and humorous letter she sent in response: "You are a brick, and you take the bun for heaping coals of fire successfully. My name is mud or any other old thing. I’ll never again find fault with your faultfinding! Nor for anything else. You are ALRIGHT! Thank you heartily for that good-natured write-up and for all the orders it is bringing me. I heard from your notice long before the journal reached us. Bless your heart, and may you have an extra Satisfying Christmas and a New Year full of more Success and lots of fun thrown in."— Elizabeth Towne "P. S.—I’ll allow Shelton all the glory for the success vibrations for 1900. But look out for MORE in 1901, not only money, but heaps of other Good Things. I AM growing ’em for you."

Parkyn replied that her vibrations were so strong they began to feel them right after the New Year. He joked that her vibrations were "hot and sizzling" and asked her to keep sending money, fun, and other good things, but to hold off on any "soul mates," explaining they weren’t quite ready for those yet.

Their back-and-forth continued in the May 1901 issue of Suggestion when a letter from Elizabeth Towne asking about advertising rates for her new book in Suggestion was accidentally overlooked. She sent a playful follow-up letter wondering if they were deliberately "snubbing the sassy editor of Nautilus." This prompted a long, humorous, and friendly editorial devoted to Elizabeth Towne, in which she was affectionately nicknamed "Naughty Lass." The issue would also feature a praising review of her new book The Constitution of Man, as well as a free advertisement for the book in the editorial section.

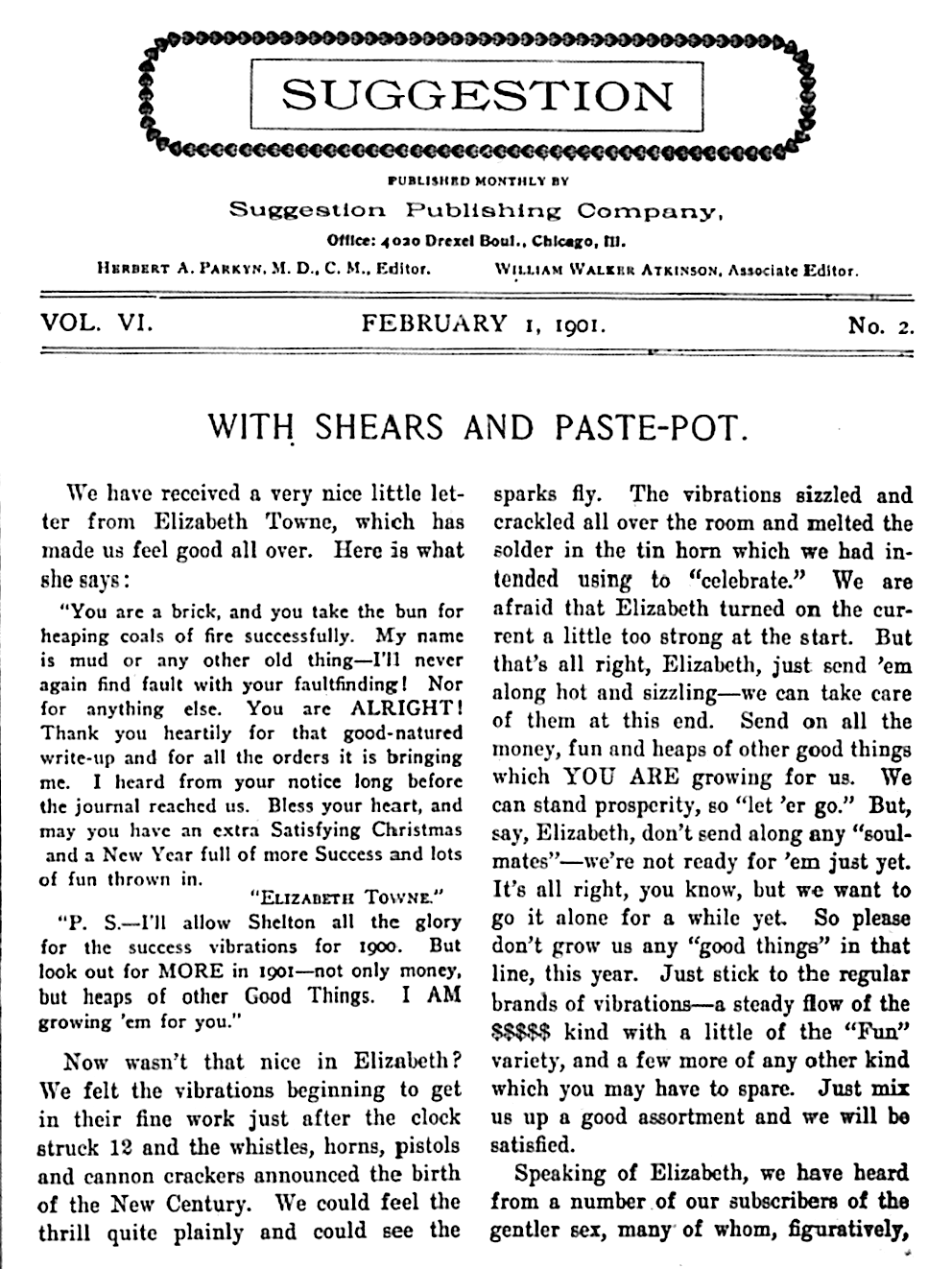
Response letter from Elizabeth Towne to Dr. Parkyn in Suggestion

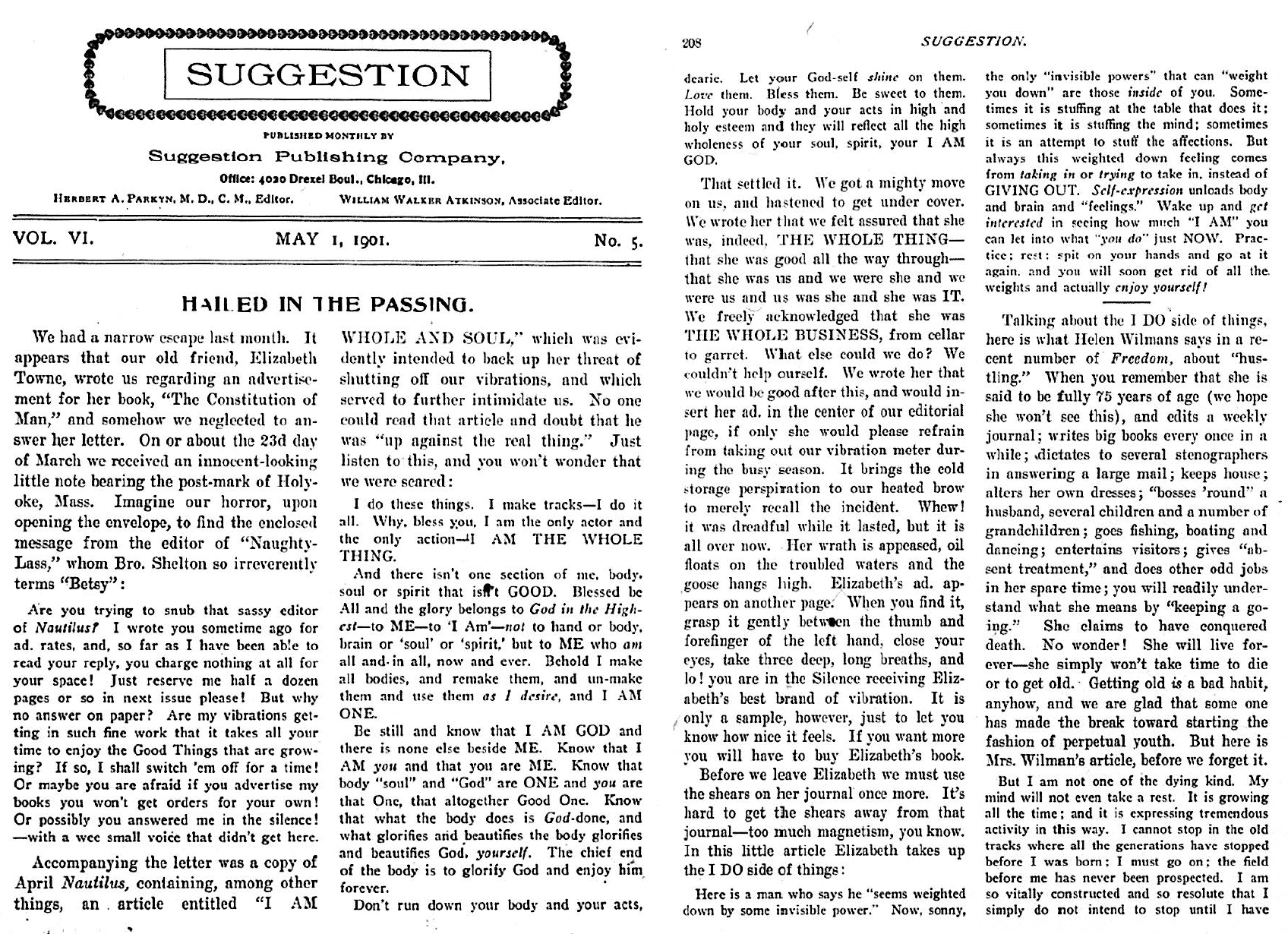
Back-and-forth between Elizabeth Towne and Dr. Parkyn in Suggestion

These exchanges between Parkyn and Towne led to a warm friendship and mutual respect between the Suggestion team and the Nautilus team, laying the foundation for a lasting collaboration and Towne becoming part of Parkyn’s family of collaborators.

== Elmer Ellsworth Carey joins Suggestion ==
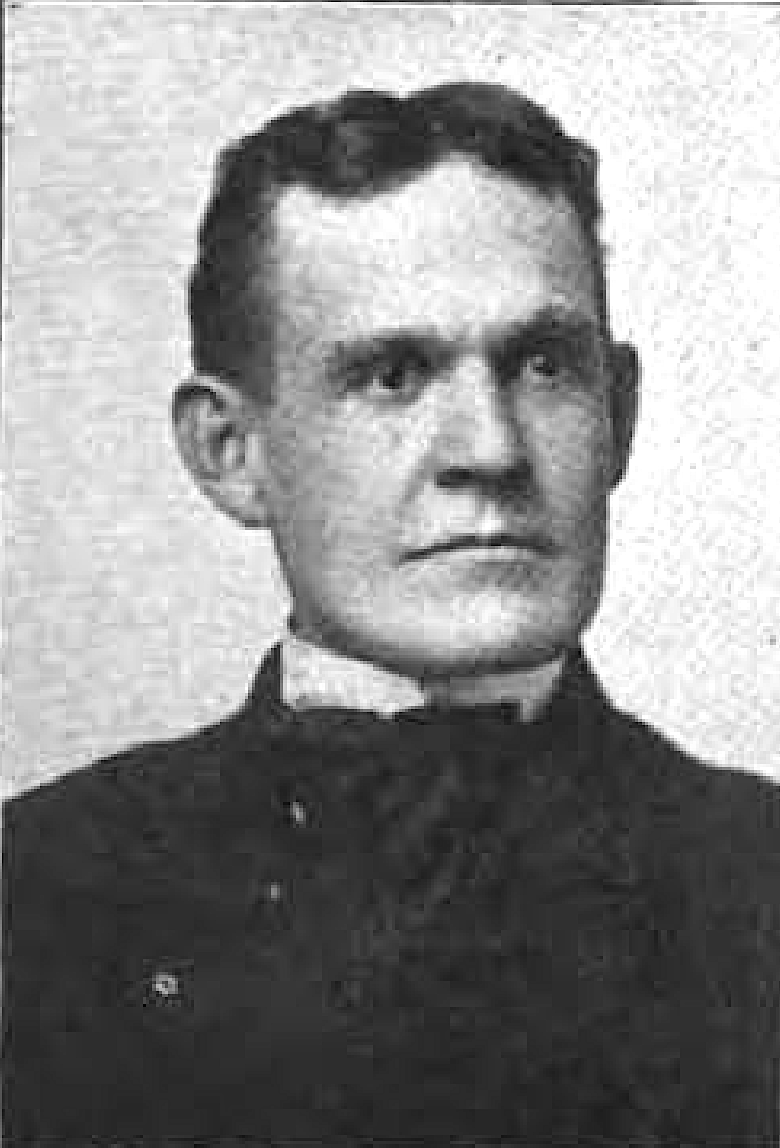
Elmer Ellsworth Carey, associate editor and manager of Suggestion

In the spring of 1903, Elmer Ellsworth Carey relocated from California to Chicago to attend Parkyn's Chicago School of Psychology and to join the staff of Suggestion magazine. He had established a long career as a journalist, writer, editor, and publisher for numerous journals, including serving as editor of The Californian Illustrated in Hawaii and publishing Freedom magazine in the Philippines during the Spanish-American War, where he exposed widespread corruption in military contracting. During his early years in the Far East and Hawaii, Carey focused on promoting investment opportunities and encouraging economic development. He later became a prominent advocate for the settlement and growth of California, eventually emerging as one of the state’s most visible public representatives.

=== Carey travelled extensively in the Far East ===
Carey spent three years living in the Philippines and traveled extensively throughout the Far East over a period of years. These journeys fostered a deep interest in Eastern spiritual philosophies and in Hindu health practices focused on diet and breath control. His studies also led him to become a Theosophist, regularly attending society lectures while living in San Francisco. In 1900, he attended several talks given by Swami Vivekananda during the Swami’s extended visit to the city and became a member of the Vedanta Society that Vivekananda founded there. While based in San Francisco, Carey began contributing detailed newspaper articles exploring the emerging field of mental sciences and the contemporary theories surrounding it. His work presented these topics in a systematic, research-oriented manner that encouraged critical examination and serious discussion.

=== Carey becomes manager and associate editor of Suggestion ===
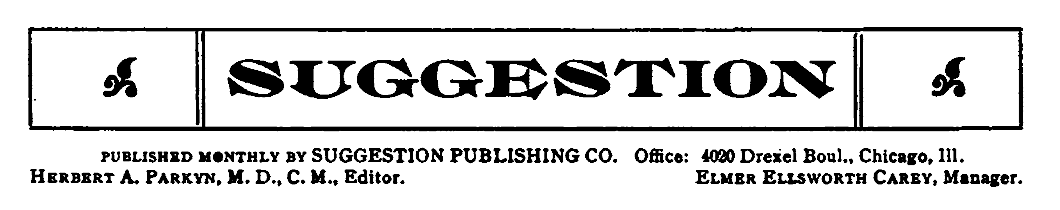
Suggestion, May 1903, with Elmer Ellsworth Carey as the new manager

Carey's involvement in this area of study ultimately led him and Parkyn to connect and in February 1903 he started to contribute articles to Suggestion. Parkyn was impressed with Carey’s writing and his experience in editing, publishing, and large-scale business development. He considered Carey an excellent fit for his expanding ventures and in May of 1903 he offered him the role of associate editor and manager of Suggestion, along with serving as Parkyn’s personal representative in several enterprises. Carey, is his first editorial explains what makes Suggestion unlike any other journal:

"The difference begins and ends with Dr. Herbert A. Parkyn. Unlike editors who rely on theory alone, Parkyn is a practicing physician with professional training and authority. He combines medical science with a clear understanding of how the mind shapes health. No other publication presents suggestive treatment equally from a physician’s standpoint and a scientific study of mental influence. Suggestion delivers practical instructions grounded in real medical knowledge, not speculation. Its guidance on 'life essentials' and mental practices is evidence of this unique approach. Suggestion is in a class by itself. Where other journals are limited and one-sided, this magazine has the full strength of both medicine and mind."

== Edgar L. Larkin joins Suggestion ==
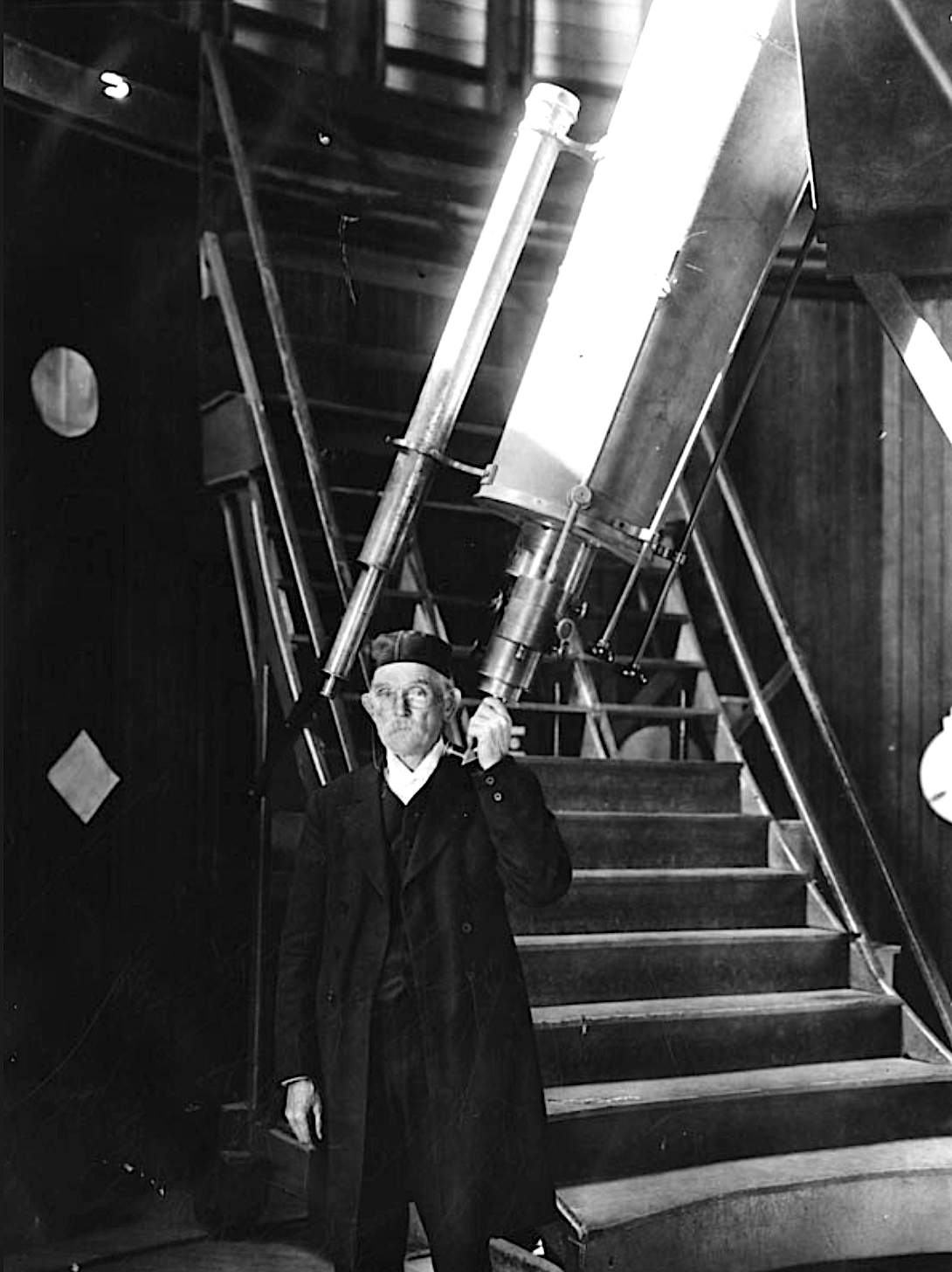
Edgar Larkin, the "Wizard of Echo Mountain"

In November 1903, Edgar Lucien Larkin started contributing articles to Suggestion magazine and by March 1904, Parkyn made him a permanent staff writer for his magazine. At the time, he was the director of the Mount Lowe Observatory, living atop Echo Mountain in California, where he spent years studying astronomy and delving into the history of occult and metaphysical philosophies.

His quarters at the observatory housed a vast collection of rare esoteric books, and he closely followed the emerging ideas of the New Thought movement through subscriptions to many of its leading magazines. Drawing on his work at the Mount Lowe Observatory, Larkin had developed a strong scientific understanding of the universe and its connections to the teachings of the ancient mystery schools, especially Yogic philosophy.

=== Radiant Energy (1903) ===
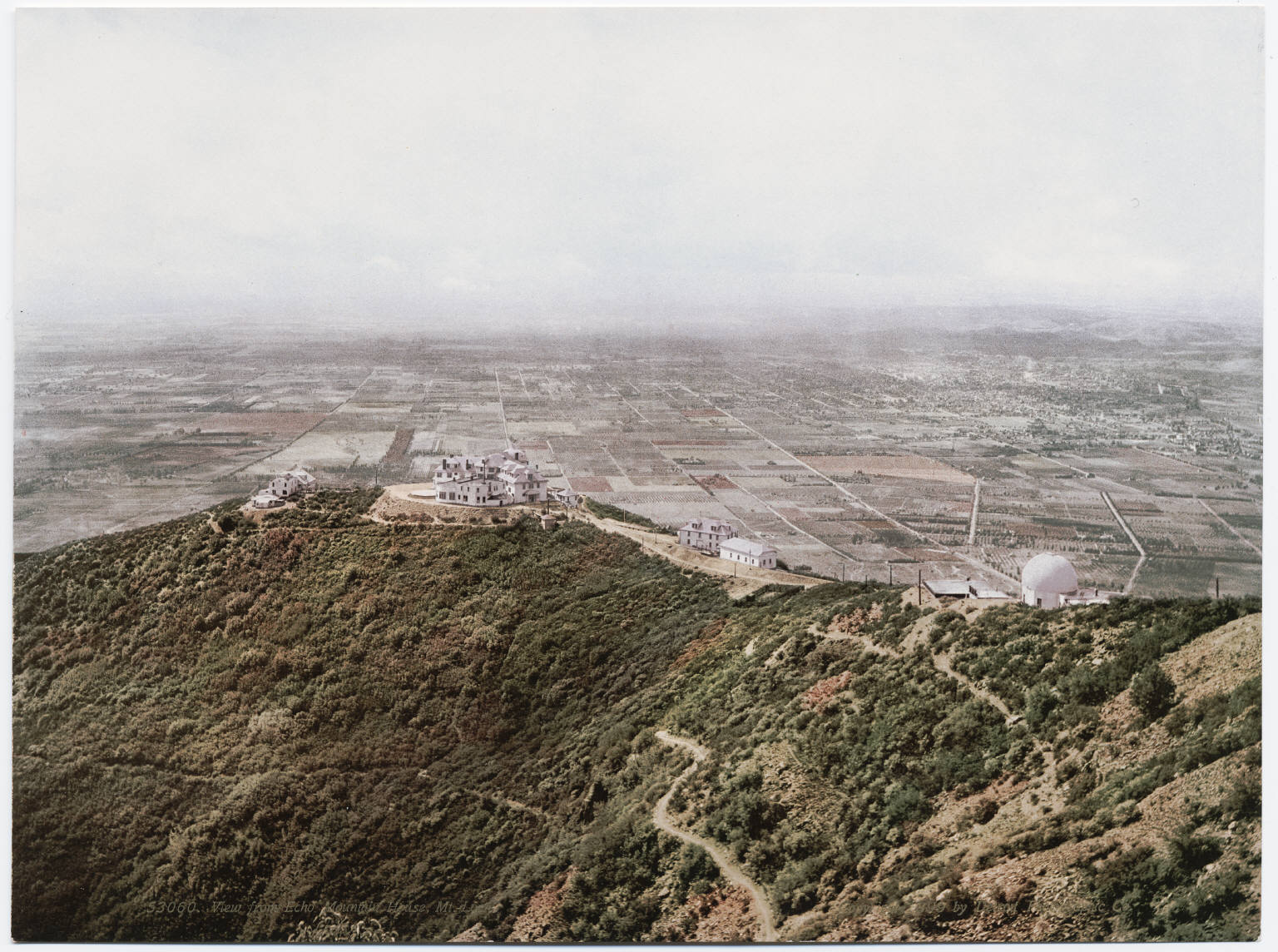
The Mt. Lowe Observatory, atop Echo Mountain in California.

In late 1903, just before joining Suggestion, Larkin published Radiant Energy. In it, he described light, heat, and electromagnetic radiation not only as measurable physical forces, but as outward signs of a deeper universal law linking the smallest atom to the largest star. Much like Parkyn, who taught that suggestion worked through definite natural laws, Larkin argued that the same principles guiding radiant energy in space also applied to the workings of the mind and human life. That energy was not just mechanical or thermal, but a living current, always in motion, that could be directed toward growth, healing, and transformation. In this view, the human mind functioned both as a receiver and a transmitter within this greater network of universal forces.

Larkin’s ideas lined up with Parkyn’s teaching that the laws of thought and the laws of nature were the same thing. In his book, Larkin described the universe as one great field of energy in which every person takes part, with the ability to direct unseen forces with the mind. This provided more scientific support to Parkyn’s teaching that, by learning and applying universal laws, people could shape both their inner lives and their outer circumstances. By connecting the careful study of astronomy with the ideas of mental science, Larkin showed that the same forces governing the stars also flowed through the human mind, demonstrating that personal mental development was part of the same radiant order that governed the universe itself.

=== Larkin's designation as "Staff Writer" for Suggestion ===
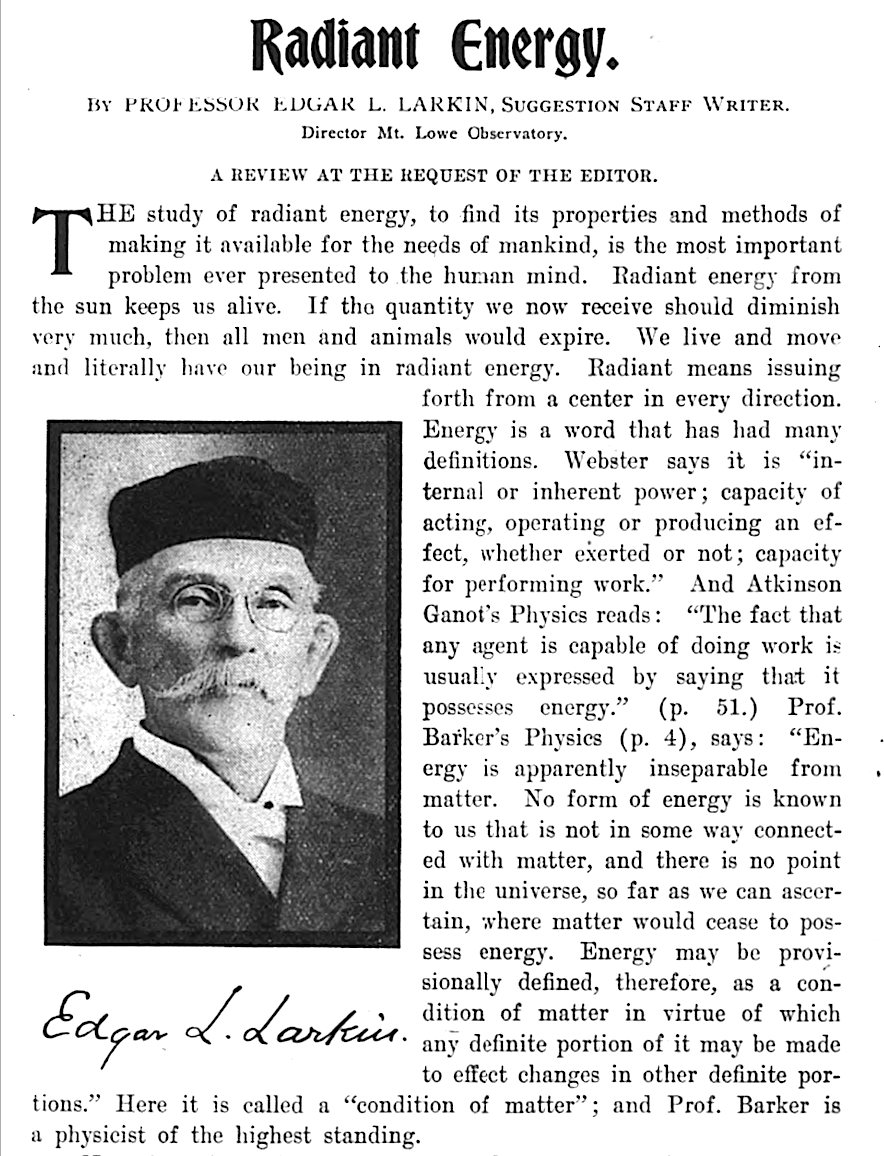
Larkin as staff writer for Suggestion

Larkin being designated as "Staff Writer" was a first for Suggestion, a distinction Parkyn had never granted to any other contributor and Larkin would be the only writer to bear this title with the magazine. This was a clear mark of Parkyn's respect for the Professor and his contributions within the publication. While the magazine had featured longtime regular contributors who appeared every month for years, and its pages were filled with renowned guest contributors each month, Parkyn still went out of his way to elevate the attention given to Larkin. Being Staff Writer set Larkin apart, signaling that his work was in complete accord with Parkyn's philosophy of Suggestive Therapeutics and mental science. The title carried a message to readers that his voice was not only trusted but was a central source of authority that embodied Suggestion's ideals.

=== Larkin's articles in Suggestion ===
When Edgar Larkin joined the staff of Suggestion, he brought both the authority of his position as director of the Mt. Lowe Observatory and a rare combination of scientific discipline with deep knowledge of the world’s oldest esoteric traditions. In his Practical Psychology series, he stated that "thought is excessively refined matter” and "thought is power," reinforcing the view of suggestion as a tangible natural force. He treated telepathy not as a mystical oddity, but as part of the lawful workings of the mind. He went further, arguing that thought could act on matter at a distance, a capacity "known for many centuries in the remote East, to the wonderful psychics of ancient India."

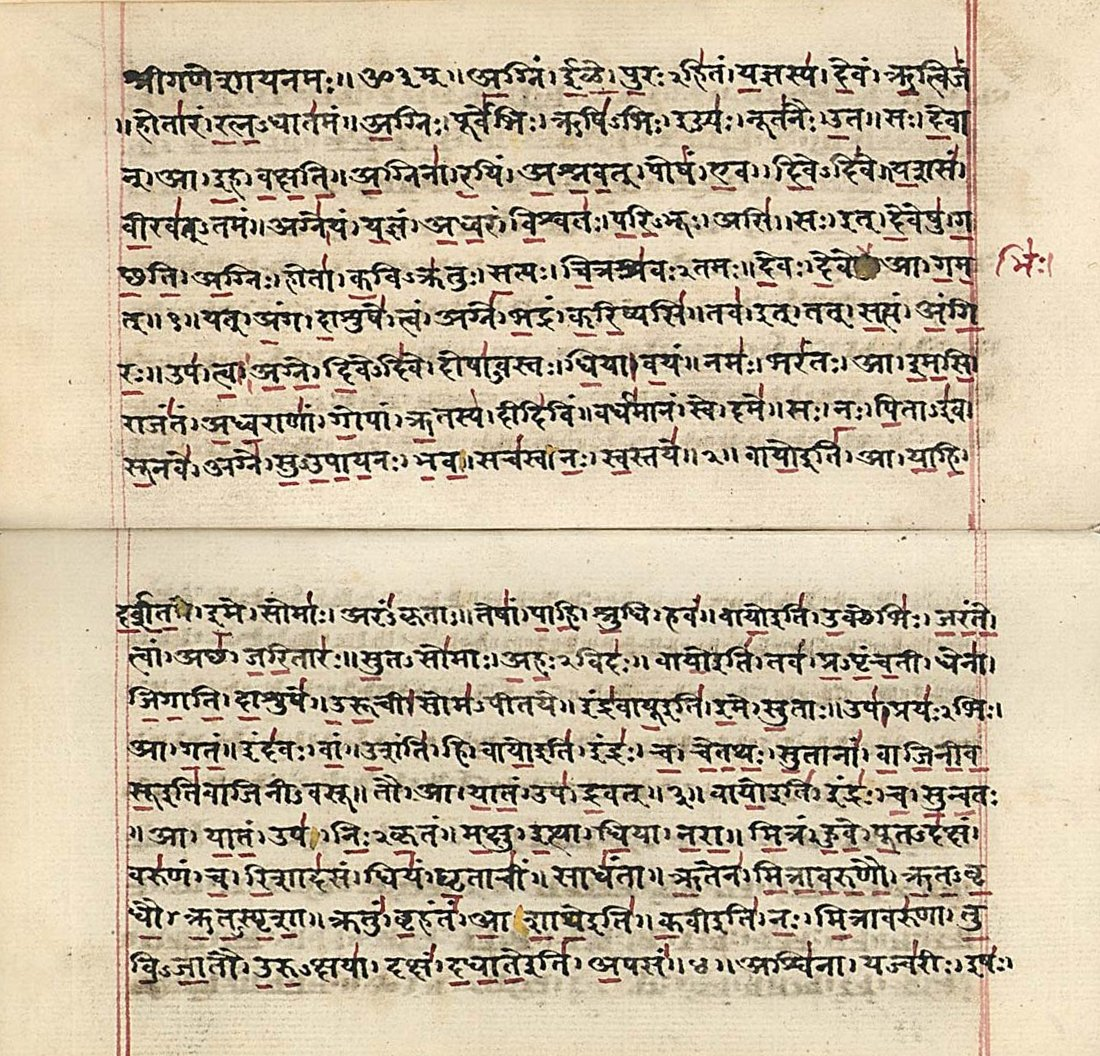
The Rig Veda is the ancient Indian collection of Vedic Sanskrit hymns (sūktas). It is one of the four sacred canonical Hindu texts known as the Vedas.

Larkin devoted substantial attention to the Vedantic view that thought precedes matter. He described the "Hindu Vedanta" as "the most wonderful product of the human mind," teaching that thought form came first, followed by the materialization of its pattern. His admiration for the "psychics of India," whom he called "the ablest psychologists that have appeared on earth," was unreserved. These adepts, he explained, believed that mind "had precedence of all existing things" and possessed "illimitable power." He frequently referred to the "wisdom of India" which taught that human minds are "parts of the mentality of nature" and can draw from the "universal store." To illustrate this, he cited the Grand Hymn of Creation form the Rig Veda:

"In the beginning there arose the Golden Child. He was the only born Lord of all that is. Whose shadow is immortality. Whose shadow is death. There was then neither nonentity or entity, neither atmosphere nor sky beyond. That ONE breathed, breathless, by ITSELF in essence. The covered germ burst forth by MENTAL heat. The ray shot across them. There is only one DEITY, the great soul. He is the soul of all being."

To Larkin this ancient cosmology was a remarkable reference to the modern understandings of the present Psychic Age, stating:

"it was thought out by our ancestors, the ARYANS, in Central Asia many thousand years ago. The strange thing about it is that all the material universe is represented as being, BORN of MIND, as a GOLDEN CHILD. And, stranger still, the entire fabric of nature is conceived to be based on SEX, DUALITY, and POLARITY."

Larkin situated these principles in the present moment, observing a worldwide "psychic movement" driven by seekers exploring their inner being, a revival he linked to "living adepts" descended from prehistoric India. His articles in Suggestion gave readers a cosmic framework, showing that the mental forces they were learning to apply were the same forces that, in the oldest wisdom traditions, shaped worlds and moved stars.

=== Larkin is sent to The Nautilus ===
Through Parkyn's promotion of Larkin as a featured writer in Suggestion, Larkin quickly became a prominent voice within the New Thought movement. As he had previously done with William Walker Atkinson, Parkyn used Suggestion to establish Larkin’s reputation before expanding his presence into another influential forum. In this case, after a year with Suggestion, Larkin was positioned in The Nautilus, a leading journal within Parkyn’s affiliated publishing circle. Parkyn supported The Nautilus through editorial endorsements and collaborative promotion, but Larkin, like Atkinson before him, brought a level of visibility and energy that further amplified the movement’s core teachings.

== Isaac Newton Vail's series on his "Annular Theory" in Suggestion ==
Parkyn and Edgar Larkin became acquainted through Isaac Newton Vail of Pasadena, California, whose work had become a major fascination for Parkyn. Vail had developed what he called the "Annular Theory" of the Earth’s formation. In his book The Waters Above the Firmament, he proposed that the Earth once possessed an "annular or ring system, such as the planet Saturn has now," composed of "aqueous vapors" that formed a "sun-illuminated cloud canopy over all the earth, except the polar regions." He argued that this theory explained past geologic revolutions and that present Earth conditions were the result of a succession of causes, specifically the "successive collapse of earth-rings and vapor canopies."

In 1905, Parkyn copyrighted and published Vail's book The Deluge and its Cause.

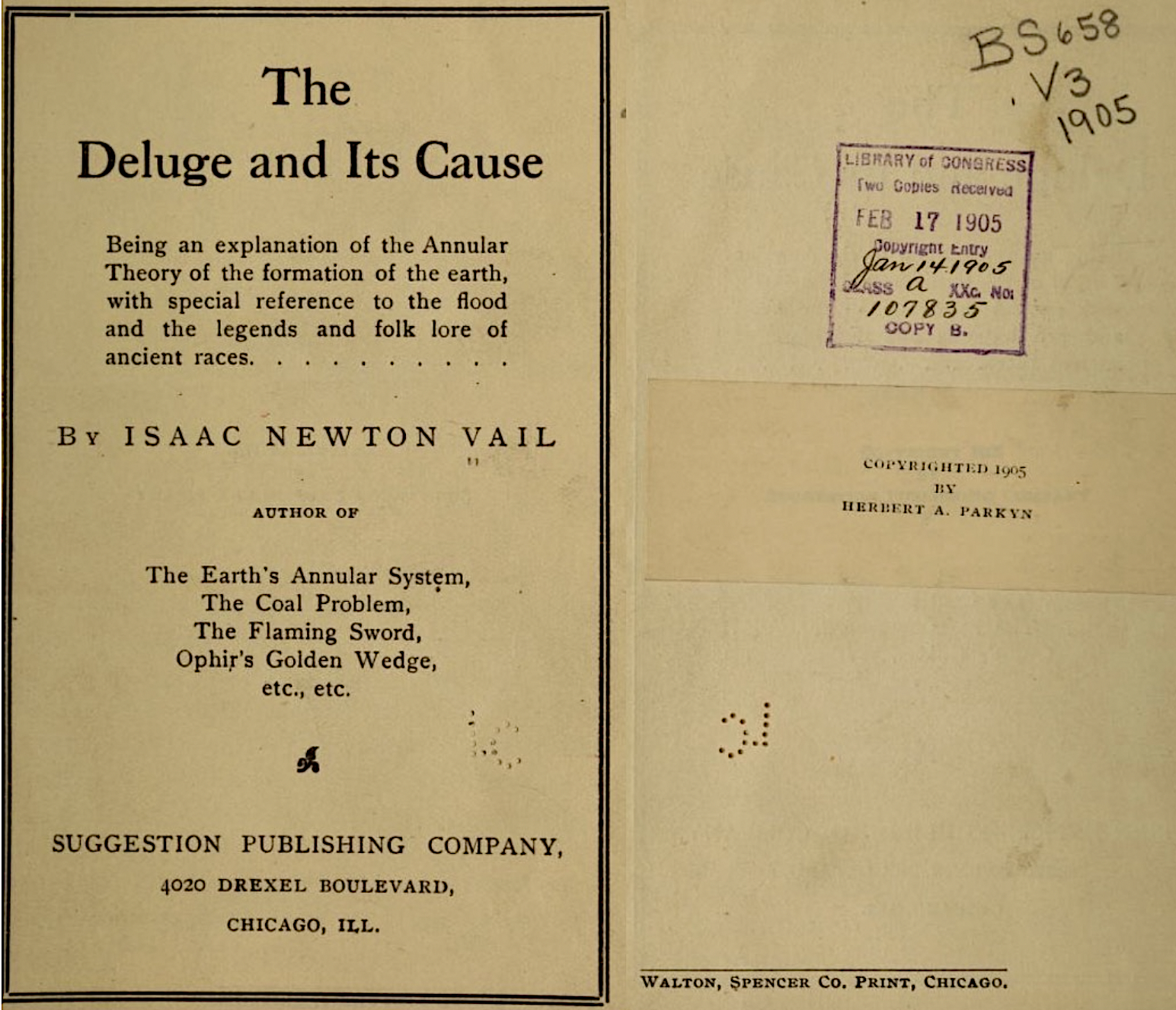
Vail's book The Deluge and Its Cause, copyrighted and published by Parkyn

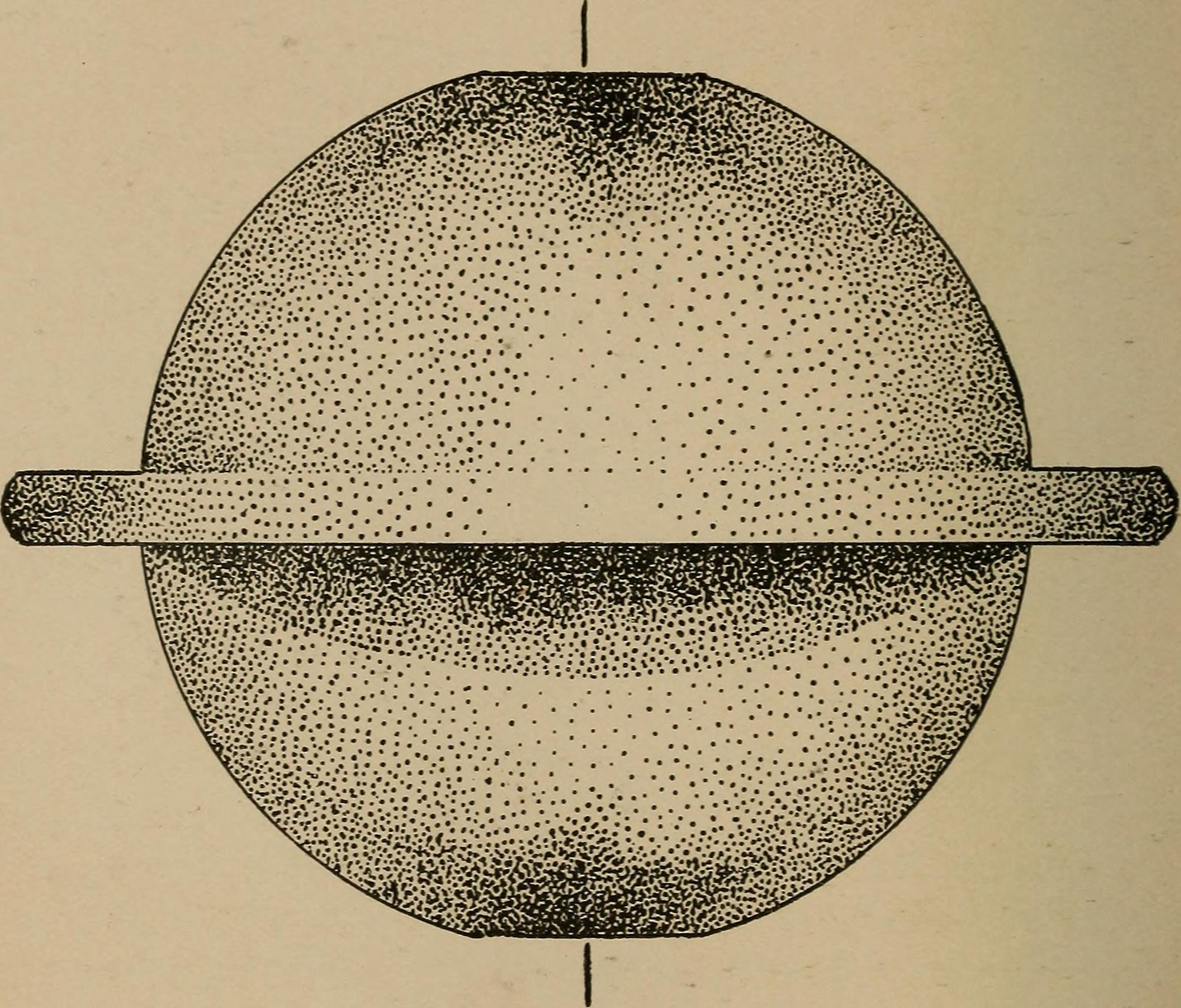
Vail's diagram showing his water ring system. In his theory, the rings collapsed to form Noah's flood.

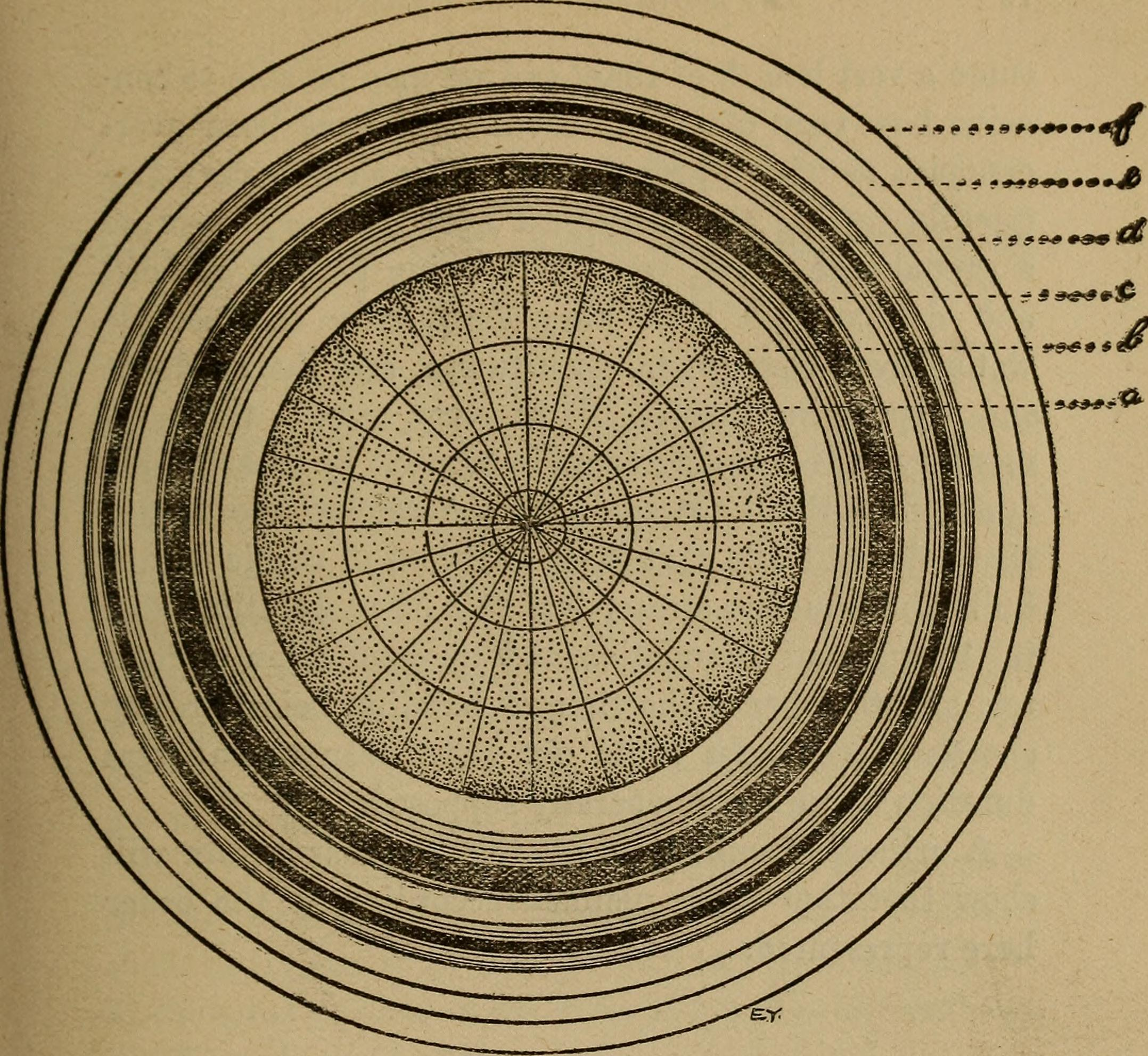
(A) earth, (B) atmosphere, (C) heavy carbons, (D) lighter carbons, (E) glacial snows, (F) outer vapors

=== Vail and Larkin ===
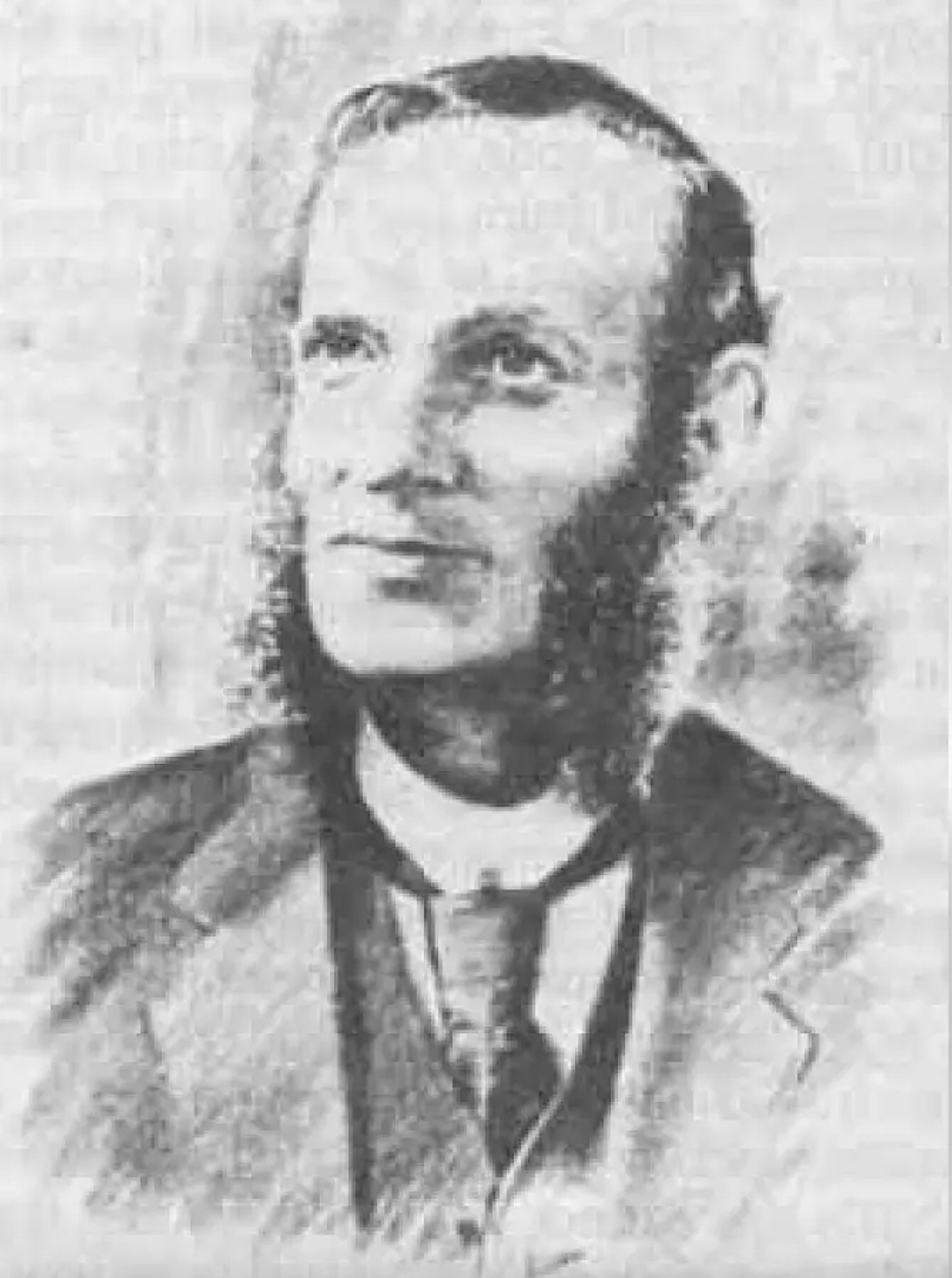
Isaac Newton Vail

In January 1903, Parkyn reached out to Vail to invite him to contribute to Suggestion and also to assist Vail with launching and promoting his own periodical, Annular Theory. This resulted in a four-part series on Vail's theories in Suggestion from February through May 1903. Parkyn's fascination with Vail's ideas led to many correspondences and several visits to Pasadena while he was traveling to and from Mexico. Through these visits, Parkyn also became well acquainted with Larkin, who was known in Pasadena as "The Wizard of Echo Mountain."

Vail and Larkin were longtime collaborators and Vail often visited Larkin at the observatory to explore the heavens and to discuss their theories and research. Parkyn recognized in Larkin someone who not only embraced the teachings of suggestive therapeutics but could also connect them seamlessly to the vast workings of the universe and the ancient philosophies of the Hindu masters. With Vail taking on the duties of editor of Annular Theory magazine, Parkyn invited Larkin to carry on in the same vein by contributing articles in Suggestion on the connections between the mental sciences and the cosmic universe.

== The Science of Salesmanship and the language of suggestion ==
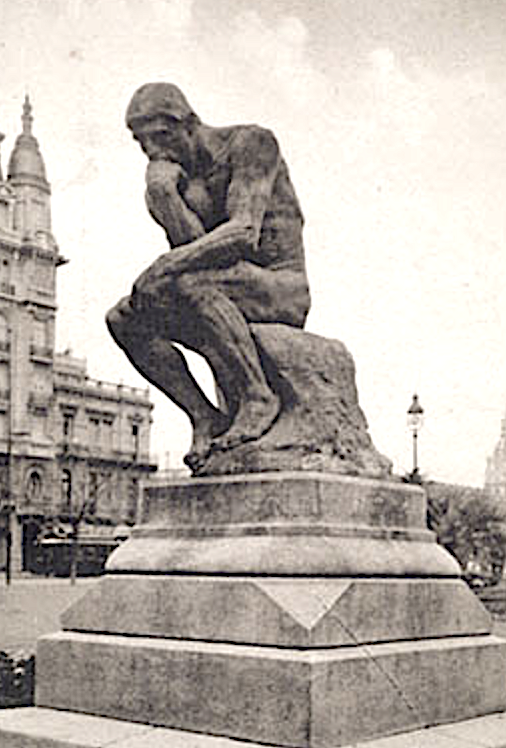
The Thinker by Auguste Rodin was originally titled The Poet, representing Dante in contemplation before the Gates of Hell. However, when it was completed in 1904, it was changed to The Thinker, influenced by the popularity of the term within the New Thought movement.

Suggestion served not only as a clinical and theoretical journal but also as a platform through which Parkyn applied suggestive therapeutics to business and salesmanship. He had first been exposed to the metaphysical interpretation of commerce through his close family friend Henry Wood, whose 1887 book Natural Law in the Business World applied mental and moral principles to economic life. Wood’s work treated business conduct as the outward expression of internal mental states such as fear, confidence, discipline, and ethical intention. Parkyn echoed this within the pages of Suggestion, advancing the view that business was governed by mental law and that commercial success depended upon disciplined control of thought and character.

He taught that those who cultivate their inner faculties of intellect, emotion, and will can rise from ordinary sellers to influential leaders. Commerce, he emphasized, is not a simple exchange but a subtle contest between minds. Every transaction involves two individuals, each seeking to shape the other’s thinking. The skilled salesman must read character, sense motive, and apply suggestion with precision. Success comes not through force or deception, but through understanding, empathy, and mental discipline. Beneath the surface politeness of business lies a quiet but constant struggle for influence, and those who are mentally prepared are the ones who prevail.

=== Are You a Thinker? ===
As early as the late 1890s, Parkyn began applying the science of suggestion to the world of advertising through Suggestion and main stream newspapers. Parkyn introduced short, concentrated suggestive phrases designed for practical use in advertising and professional life. Among the earliest was "Are You a Thinker?", promoted as a psychological prompt intended to arrest attention and influence the reader before a message even began. Leveraging his connections in the printing and newspaper trades, Parkyn widely promoted the phrase as a psychological trigger in newspaper business ads. He also capitalized on this marketing campaign by branding Suggestion magazine as the publication for "Thinkers." He referred to its readership collectively as the "League of Thinkers" and established a dedicated "Thinker" department within the magazine.

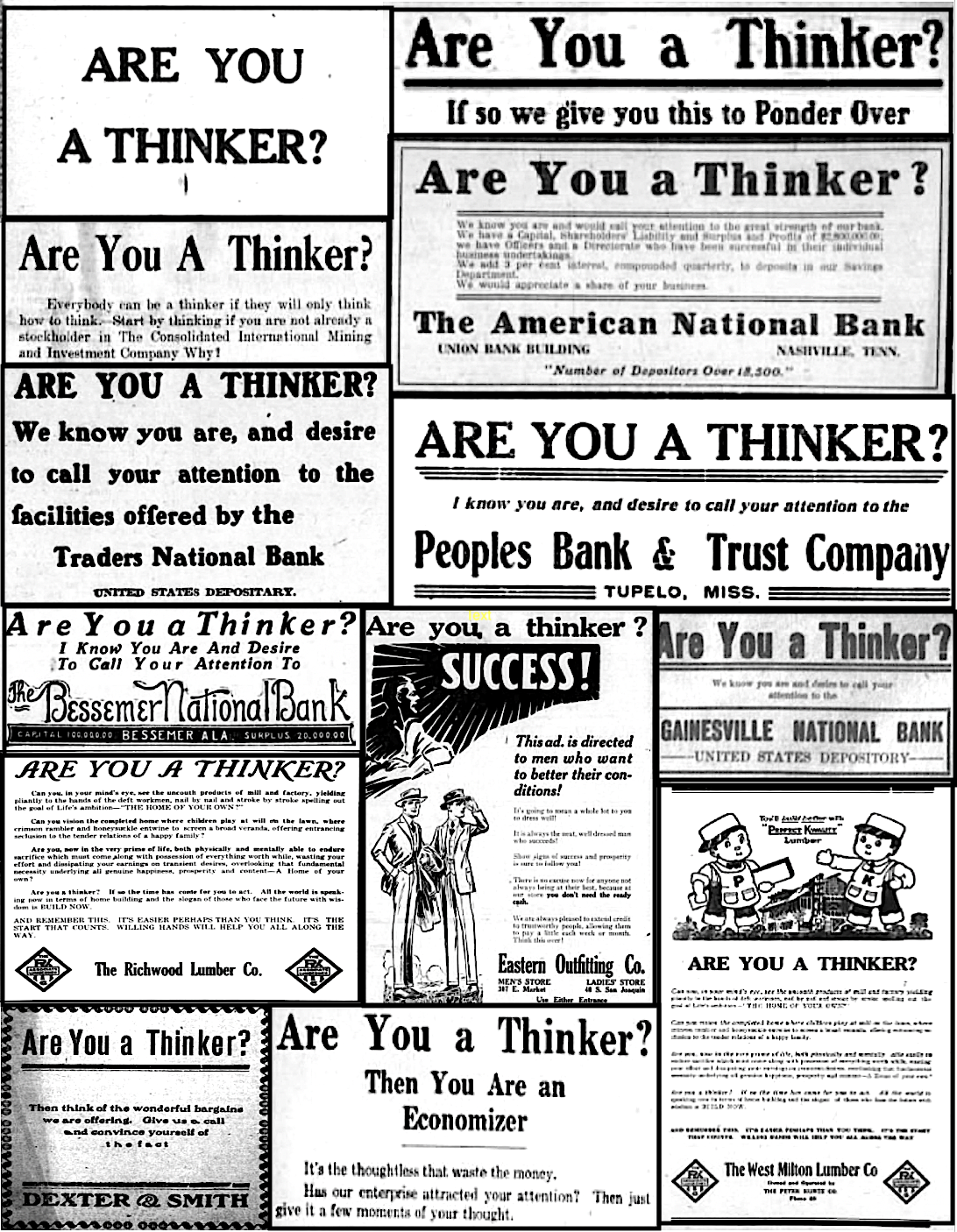
"Are you a thinker?" in newspaper ads.

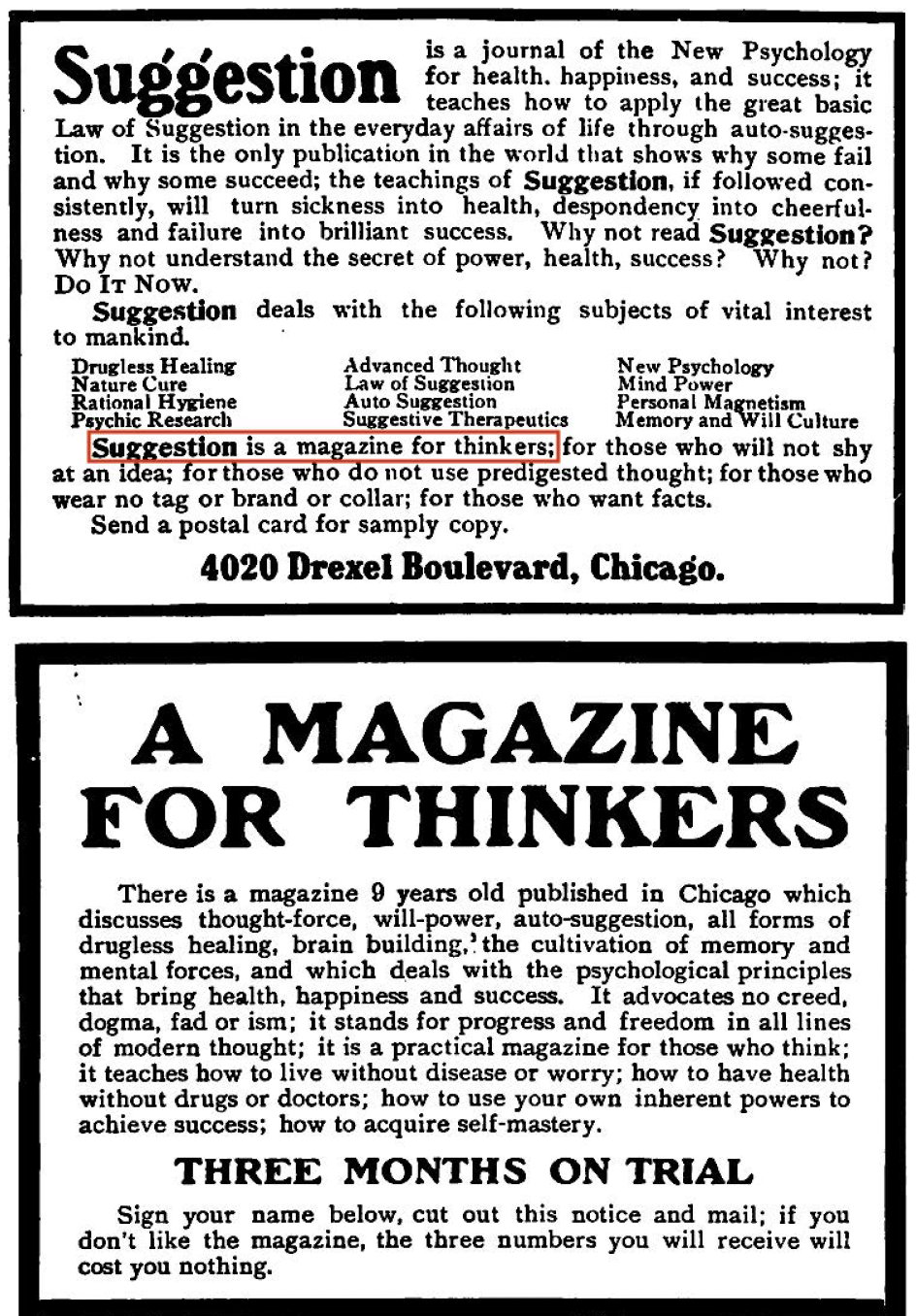
Suggestion is a magazine for "Thinkers"

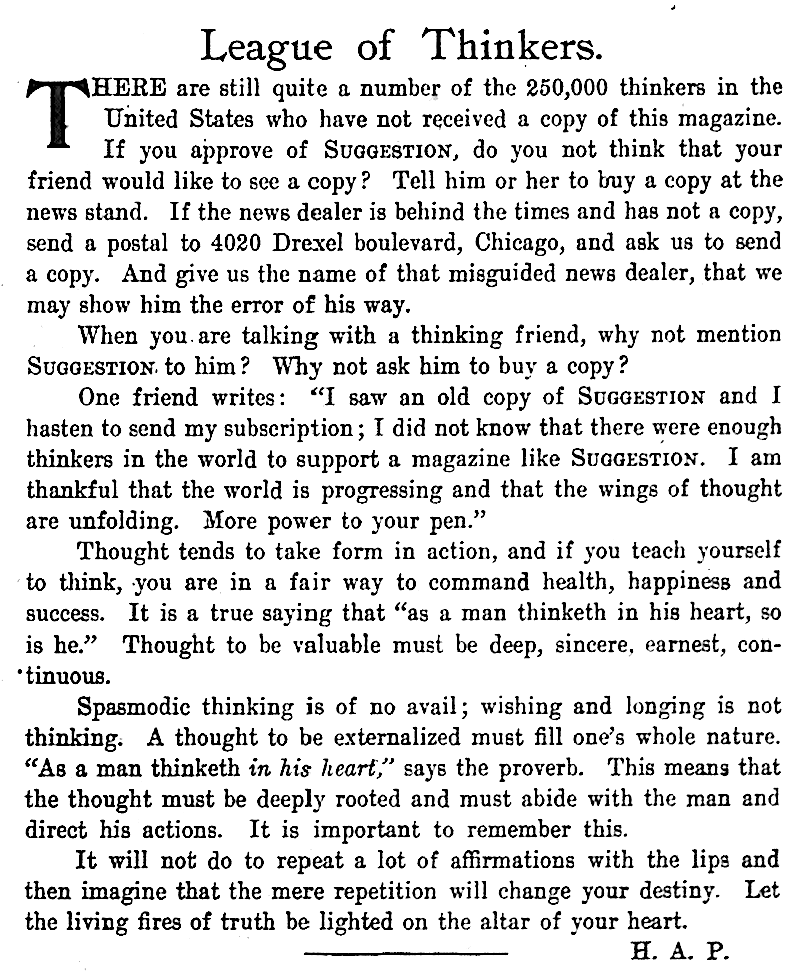
The League of Thinkers in Suggestion

The definition of a "thinker" in Suggestion was stated as:

"A thinker wears no tag, collar or number; his opinions are not received from a newspaper, a book or a pulpit. He is not a parrot. 'They say' has no terrors for him. He wants facts, and from these facts he builds his own ideas. And he reserves the right to change his opinions as new light is received. If you never change your opinions, you never think. Use your brain, and it will reveal to you new virtues. Thought is the only factor in evolution; thought is the only power that can regenerate mankind. Thought will kill ignorance, greed, and bring all elements into harmony with law. When this occurs evil will be unknown. Think first yourself; then be tolerant with others who think. Respect the opinions of others is the first rule of mortality."

=== "Do It Now!" ===
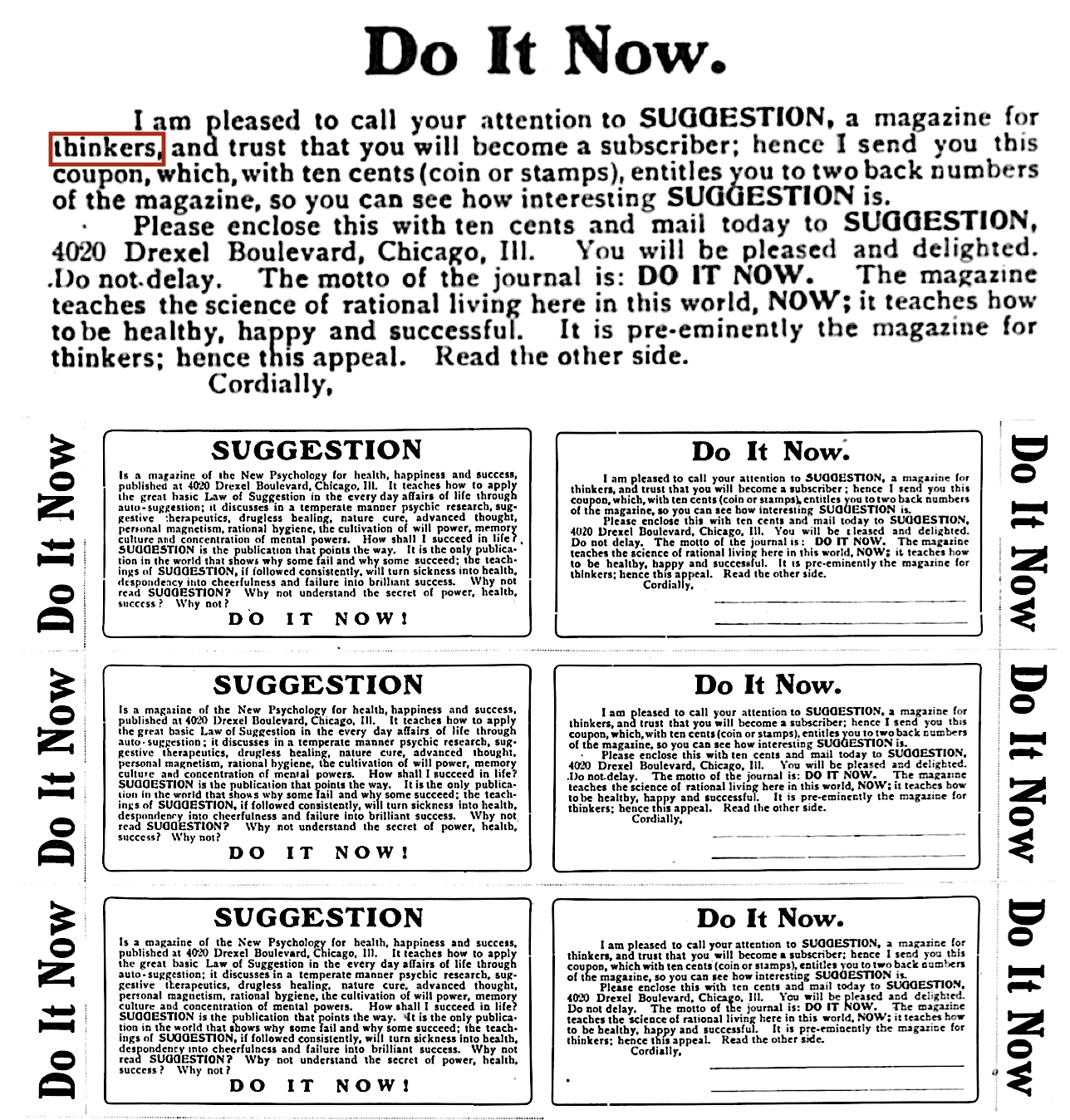
A "Do It Now" campaign run in Suggestion

Following the success of the “Thinker” campaign and growing demand for practical advertising formulas, Parkyn introduced the phrase "Do It Now!" Unlike "Are You a Thinker?," which appealed largely to intellectual and financial audiences, “Do It Now!” was designed for universal commercial use. Its adaptability led to widespread adoption in newspapers and magazines.

The slogan quickly extended beyond print advertising, appearing on placards in offices and factories and becoming a national motto urging immediate action. It was displayed on desks, incorporated into agency and postal office decor, and was quoted publicly by figures including President Theodore Roosevelt and Andrew Carnegie.

Within Suggestion, Parkyn adopted "Do It Now!" as the official motto. The slogan appeared prominently on the cover and inspired the formation of a dedicated "Do It Now!" club and department. The magazine began publishing a series of "Do It Now!" poems, submitted by both readers and writers in support of the idea. Parkyn also distributed wall and desk ornaments featuring the motto, printed on granite paper and mounted with red borders, spreading the message into offices and homes across the country.

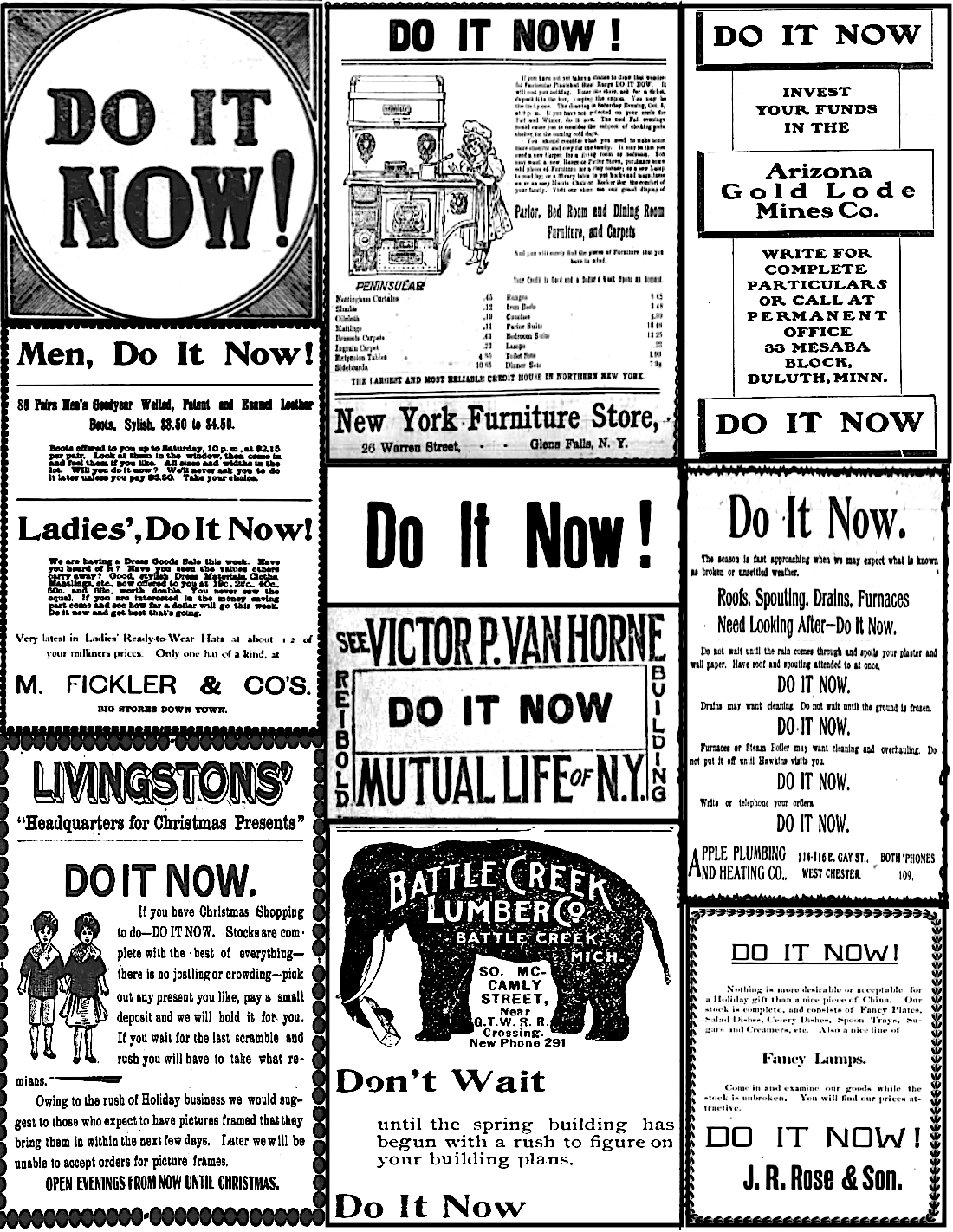
Parkyn's suggestion "Do it Now!" in newspapers across the country.

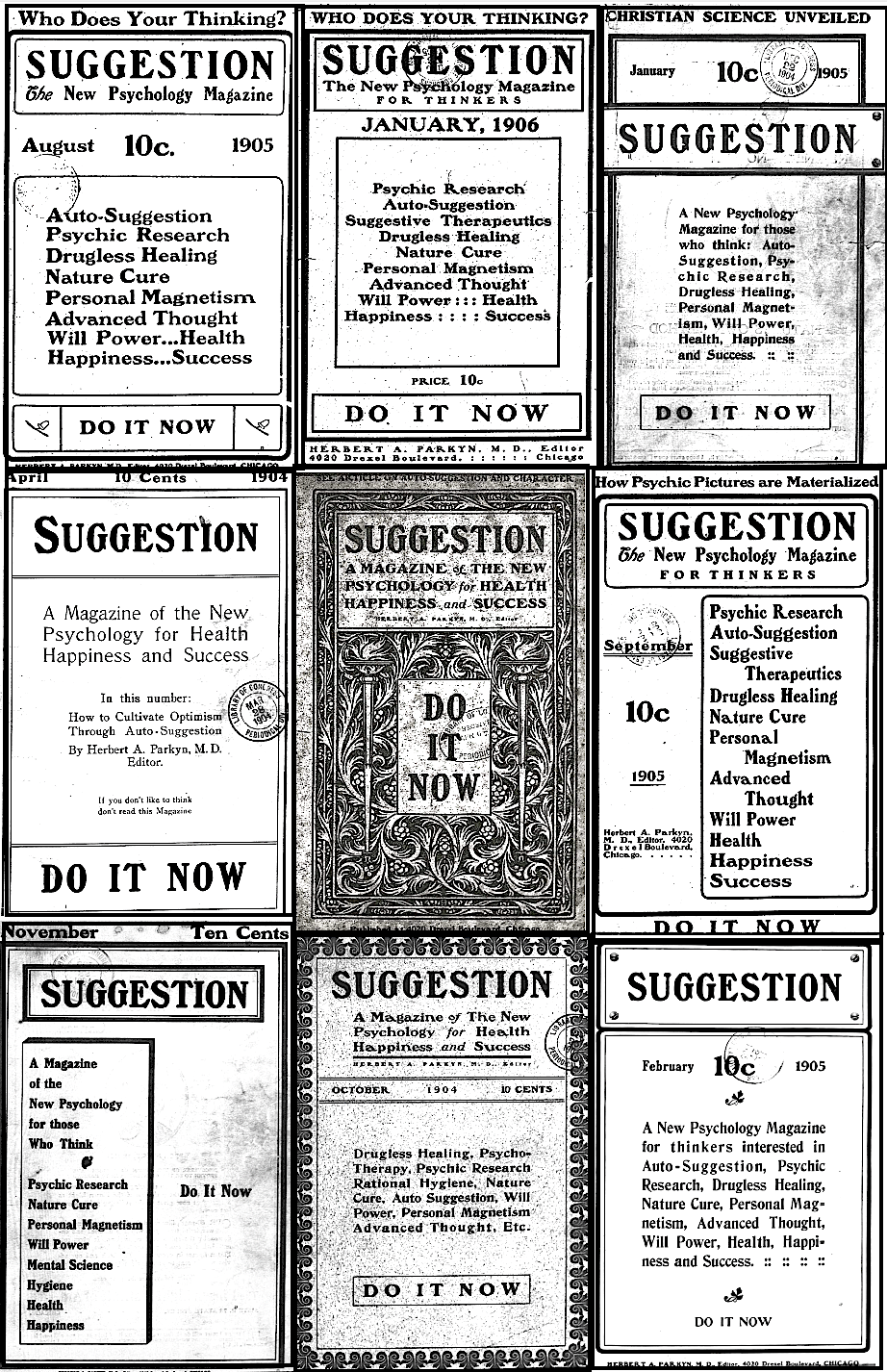
Suggestion covers with the "Do It Now" motto

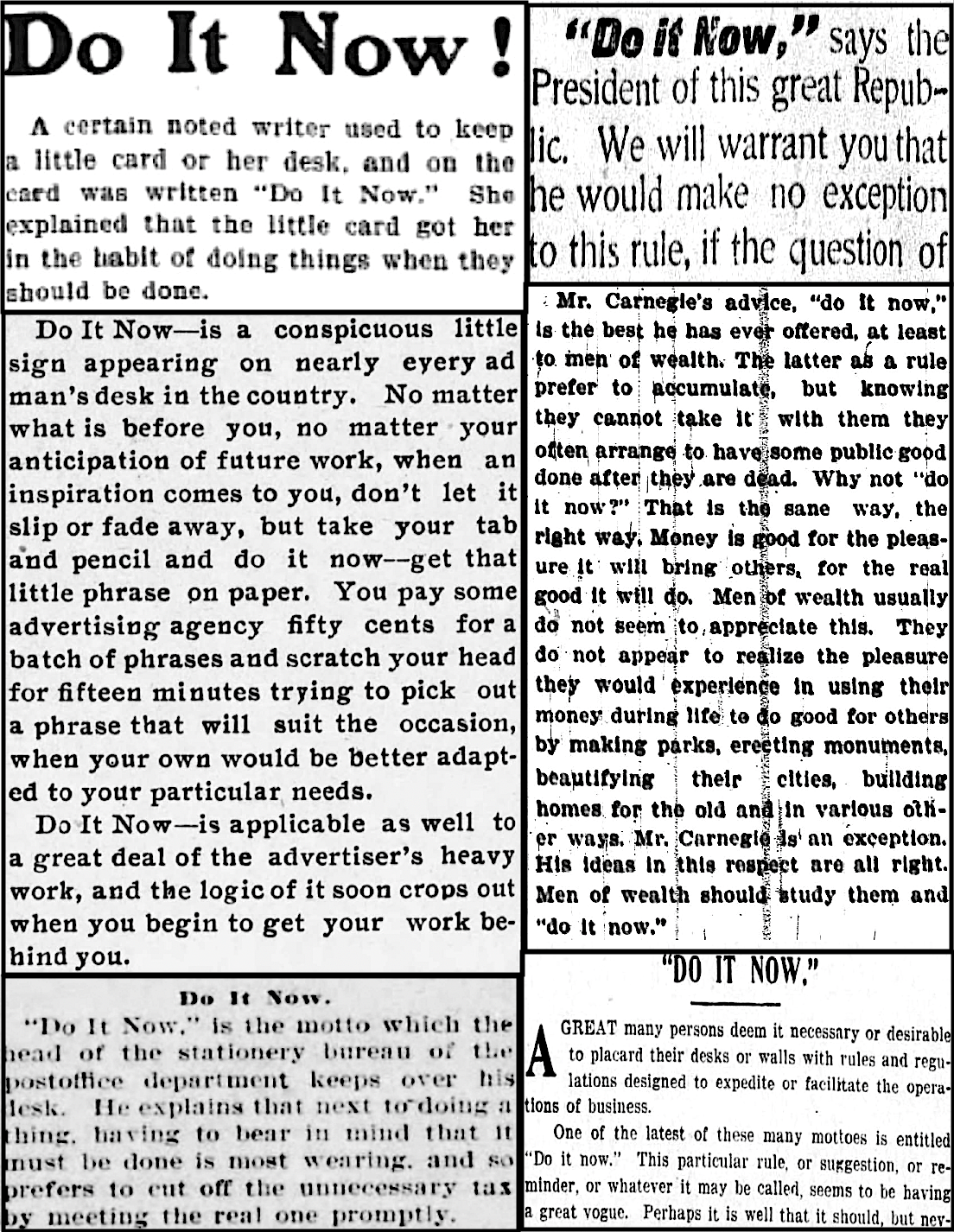
Articles on the "Do It Now!" fad that swept the country.

=== "Thought Takes Form in Action" and "Health, Happiness, and Success" ===
Other condensed suggestive formulations were similarly promoted through Suggestion and national newspapers, including Parkyn's most well-known quote, "Thought takes form in action" as well as "Health, Happiness, and Success," what he termed the trinity of mankind’s demand, desire, and affirmation. These phrases distilled the technical principles of suggestive therapeutics into brief affirmations suited to commercial advertising and personal development messaging.

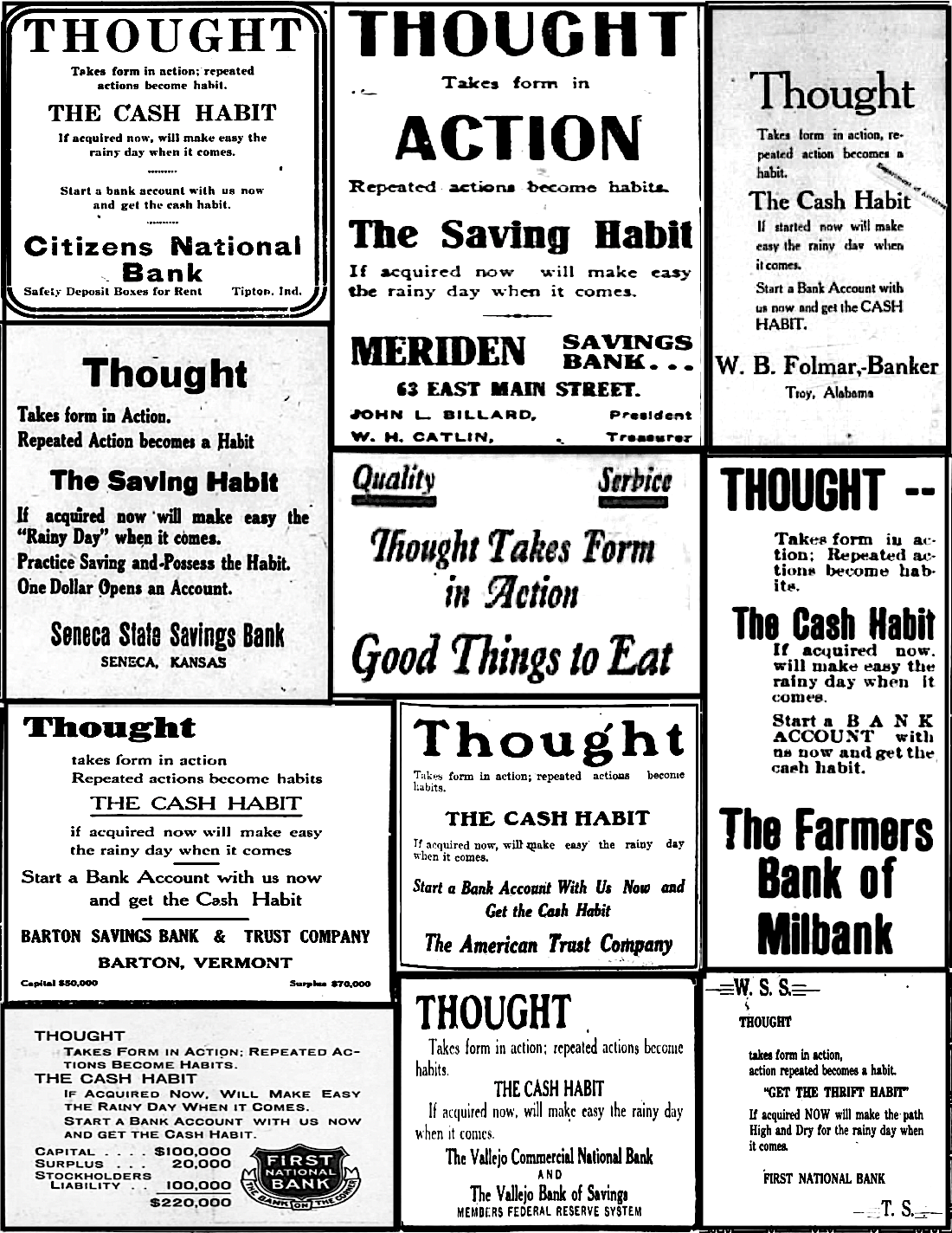
Parkyn's most famous quote, "Thought takes form in Action," used in ad campaigns

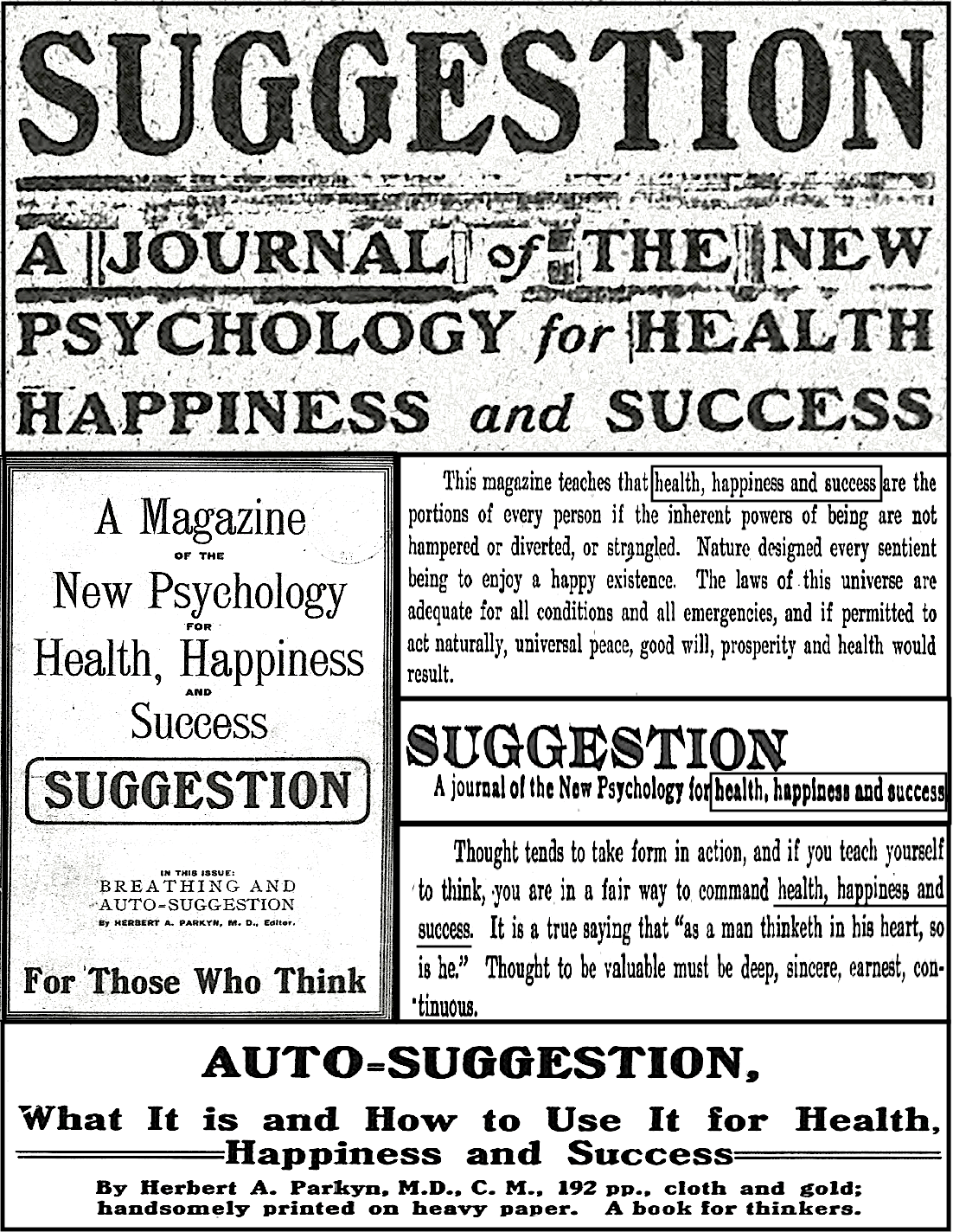
Suggestion's primary slogan "Health, Happiness, and Success,"

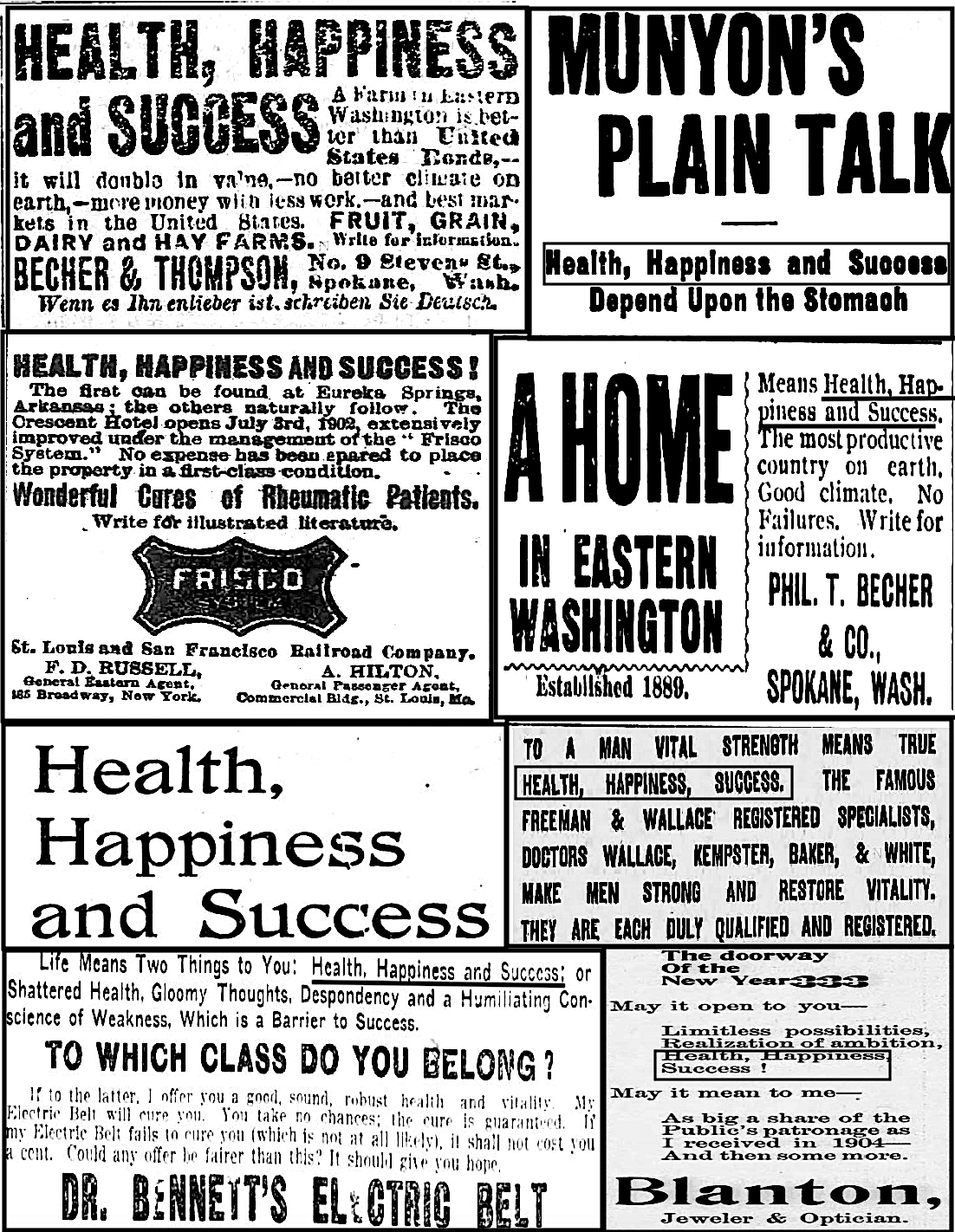
Ad campaigns using Parkyn's suggestive phrase, "Health, Happiness, and Success."

By disseminating these slogans through Suggestion, Parkyn transformed elements of his therapeutic system into widely circulating phrases that moved beyond the clinical setting into business culture and the broader New Thought movement. As periodicals and schools associated with Parkyn adopted the same expressions, the slogans became a unifying vocabulary across multiple publications. In this way, Suggestion functioned as the central platform through which Parkyn’s science of suggestion was reformulated into short, repeatable prompts designed for mass influence in both commerce and personal development.

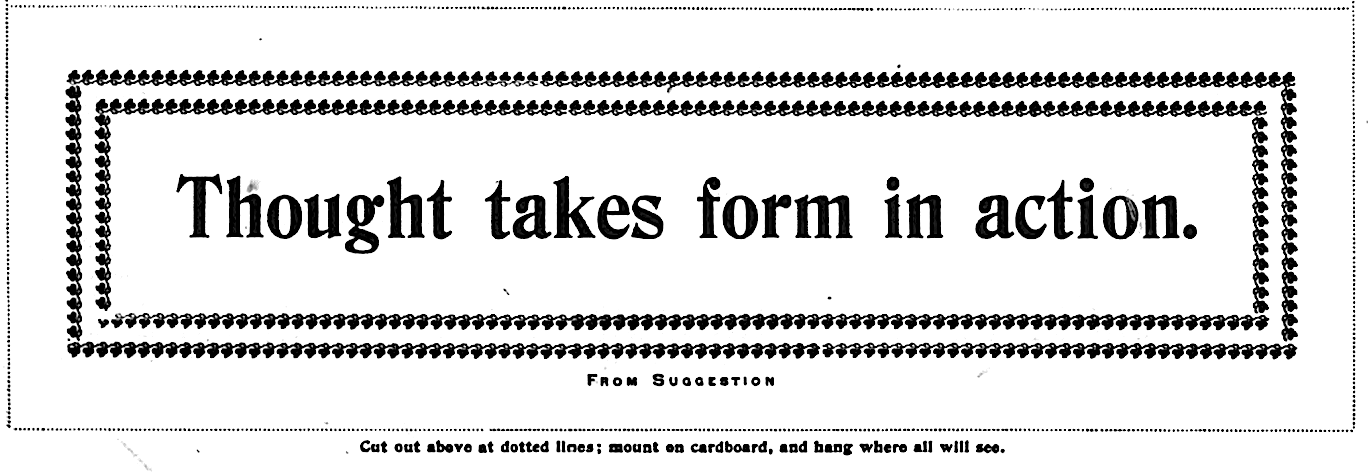
Suggestion had cutouts of Parkyn's axiom that could be mounted

=== Parkyn's suggestive phrases become slogans for the New Thought movement ===
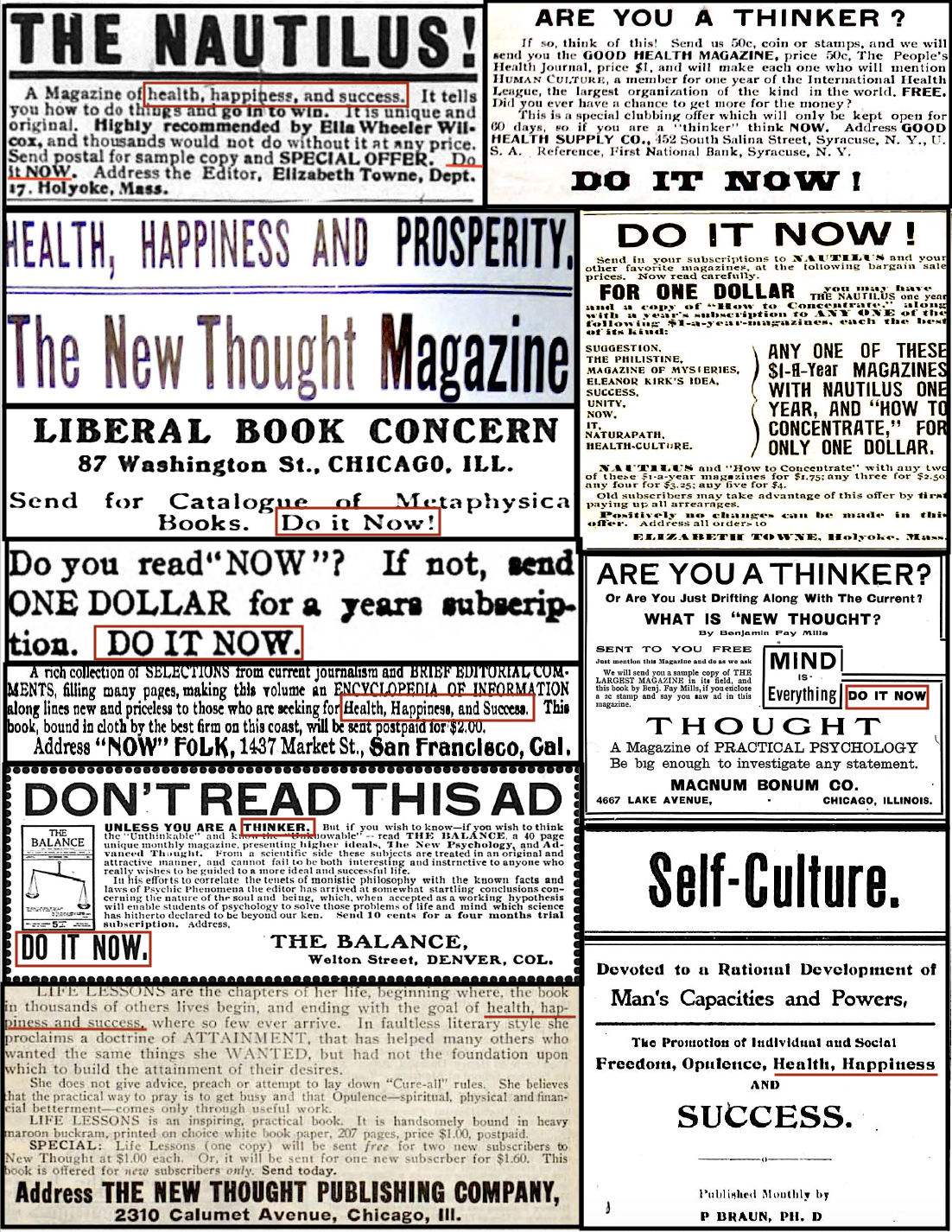
Some of the many samples of Parkyn's suggestive phrases being used throughout the New Thought community

Through Suggestion, Parkyn initiated a campaign to unify the New Thought movement around the Law of Suggestion as the foundational principle underlying its various mental science teachings. He encouraged periodicals and affiliated schools to adopt shared phrases that identified them as part of a cohesive network grounded in the practical application of suggestion. These included slogans prominently branded in Suggestion, such as "Do it Now," "Thinker," and "Health, Happiness, and Success." The initiative also formed part of a broader suggestive strategy devised by Parkyn, centered on the repeated use of focused affirmations that would culminate in the suggestive affirmation of “think thoughts of health, happiness, and success, now!"

The response was widespread. New Thought publications and institutions across the country incorporated Parkyn’s phrases into their editorial content, advertising, and branding. Many were operated by former students or close collaborators, including New Thought, The Nautilus, Now, Self-Culture, Thought, Unity, The Balance, Good Health, To-morrow, The Business Philosopher, The Segnogram, Swastika, and Human Culture. As these publications adopted the same key expressions, the phrases became common slogans within the New Thought movement, appearing in magazines, books, lectures, and advertisements nationwide and creating a shared vocabulary across diverse strands of mental science.

=== The Sheldon School of Scientific Salesmanship ===
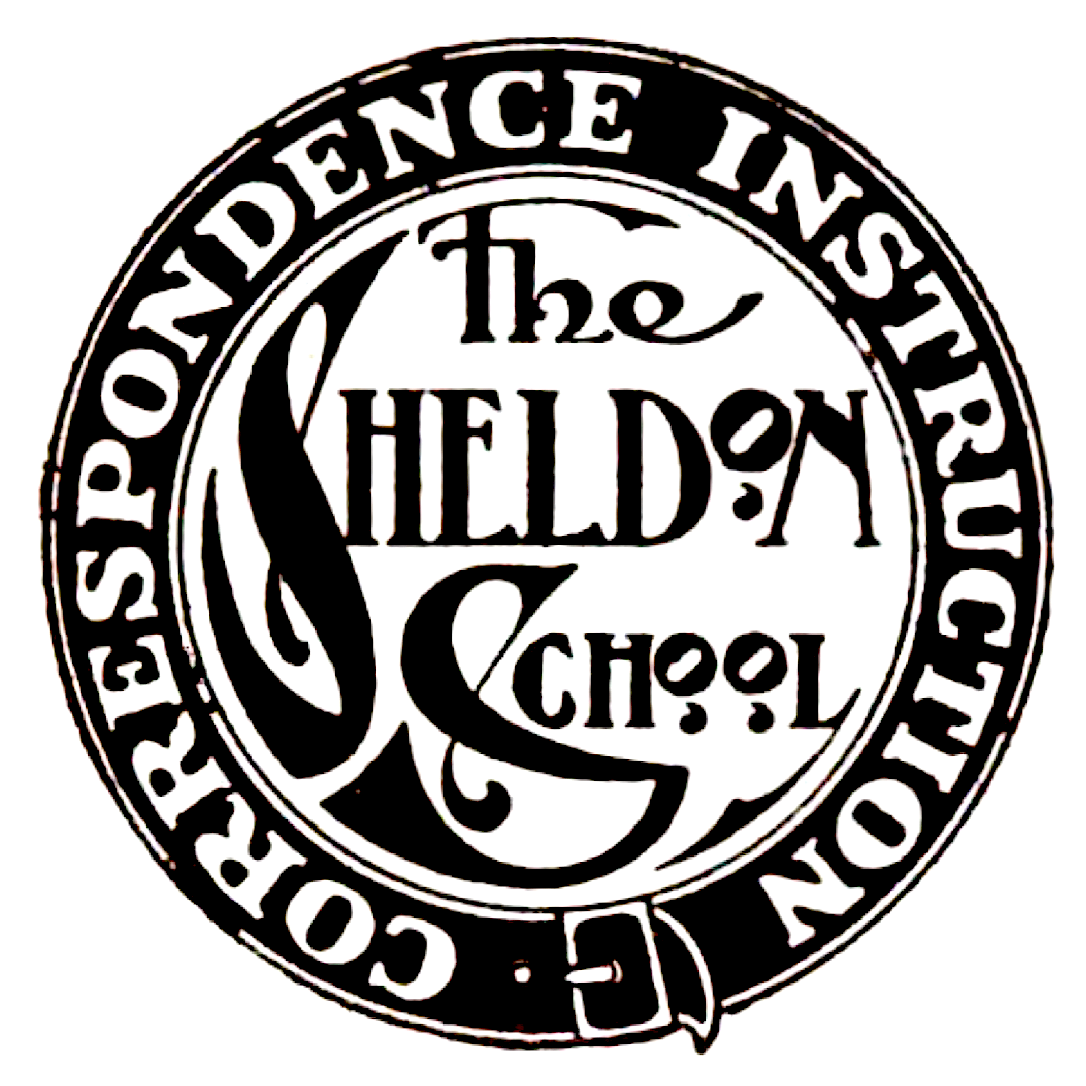
The Sheldon School

Parkyn saw advertising as a powerful and influential field, one with immense potential for good, but also vulnerable to misuse. This led Parkyn and his associate, Arthur F. Sheldon, to create the Sheldon School of Scientific Salesmanship in Chicago in 1902. The school was dedicated to training advertising professionals from across the country in the core principles of the law of suggestion and instill greater integrity and truthfulness within a profession that played such a critical role in shaping public thought. Parkyn taught that suggestion was not morally neutral, but led to morality, stating, "To study and use suggestion properly is to become a moral person, because the process depends on consciously cultivating traits like truthfulness, courage, confidence, and justice."

The school’s curriculum included a required section on suggestion prepared by Parkyn and no diploma was awarded without successful completion of that component. The school became widely known at the time for its instruction in scientific salesmanship and promoting psychological training as the foundation of effective selling.

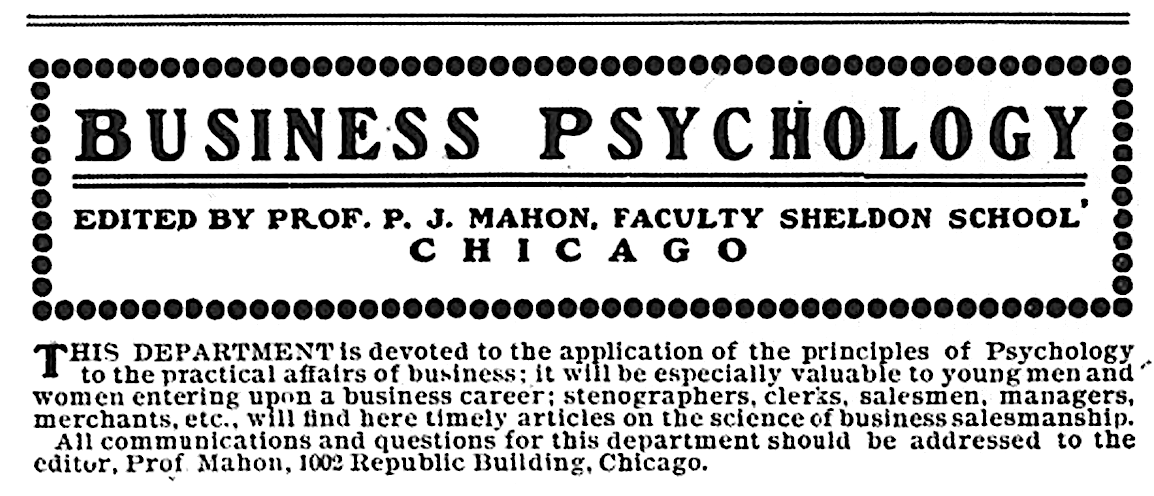
The Business Psychology department in Suggestion

Within Suggestion, Parkyn created a dedicated department titled "Business Psychology" to support this collaboration. The section was edited by P. J. Mahon of the Sheldon School and presented business-specific adaptations of suggestive therapeutics, including the use of auto-suggestion to cultivate confidence, concentration, optimism, and ethical character in professional life.

Parkyn featured the Sheldon School in editorials and articles that described salesmanship as a science governed by definable psychological laws rather than chance or instinct. He framed the school’s training as an extension of the broader suggestion movement, asserting that readers who understood the laws of mental causation in business could operate with clarity and certainty rather than uncertainty.

== Suggestion is sold to Henry Clay Hodges ==
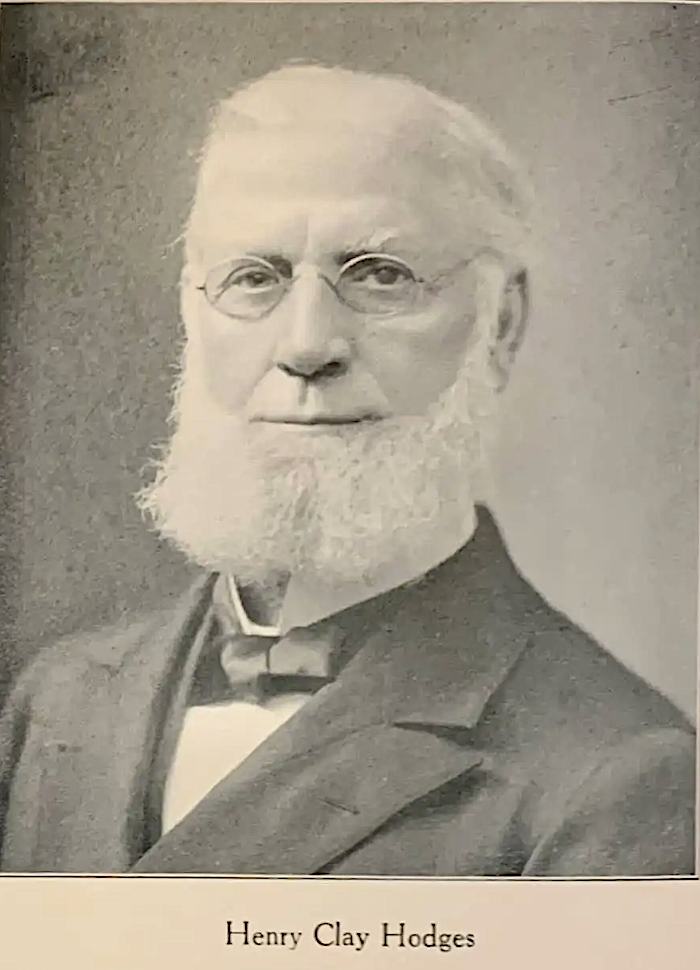
Henry Clay Hodges, one of Detroit's most successful citizens

In November 1906, Parkyn announced to his readers that he had sold Suggestion magazine to Henry Clay Hodges, a Detroit multi-millionaire and industrialist. In his final editorial, Parkyn wrote that the decision was made with deep regret and explained that he had made a promise several years earlier to devote his time and financial resources to assisting a close personal friend in a business venture. He stated that the combined demands of maintaining the magazine and fulfilling this obligation would be too great, making the sale necessary. The venture he referred to was the Black Sands and Gold Recovery Company.

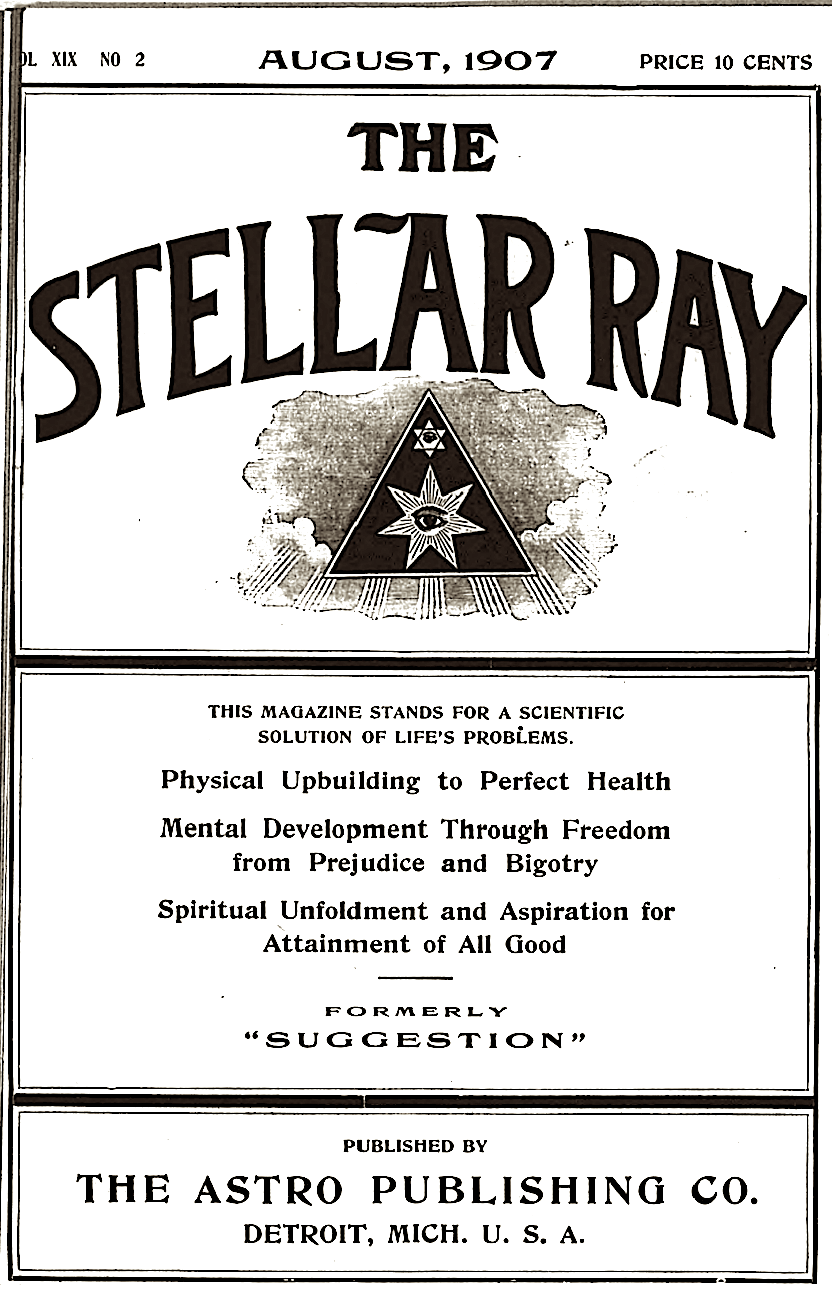
The Stellar Ray magazine

Parkyn emphasized that the sale did not represent a retreat from the mental sciences. He assured readers that he intended to devote himself more fully to writing and developing his ideas in book form and that they would continue to hear from him through future publications. He expressed strong confidence in Hodges as the new owner, noting that Hodges held long-standing respect for the magazine and that its declaration of principles would remain unchanged. Parkyn predicted that Hodges’s energy, enthusiasm, and substantial financial resources would significantly expand the magazine’s reach within a short period.

Henry Clay Hodges had been closely associated with Suggestion for several years prior to the purchase. He was a frequent advertiser through his multi-volume book series Science and Key of Life and a contributor of articles on astrology and related subjects. His interests extended broadly across esoteric fields rooted in Hermetic, Rosicrucian, and Hindu philosophy, including astrology, numerology, vibration, color, sound, and cosmic influences on the mind.

=== Suggestion becomes The Stellar Ray ===
After assuming control, Hodges renamed the magazine The Stellar Ray and added a regular department devoted to astrology, reflecting his primary area of study. Beyond these changes, the publication remained continuous with Suggestion in both tone and purpose, maintaining Parkyn’s original emphasis on mental science, natural law, and the application of thought as a formative force, while benefiting from Hodges’s financial backing.

It featured many of Parkyn's closest associates with a Department of Psychic Research headed by Edgar L. Larkin, a Department of Psychical Sciences and Unfoldment led by J. C. F. Grumbine, and a Department of New Thought directed by Charles Brodie Patterson. Regular contributions also came from well-known writers including Ella Wheeler Wilcox, Eleanor Kirk, and Yogi Ramacharaka.

== Legacy ==
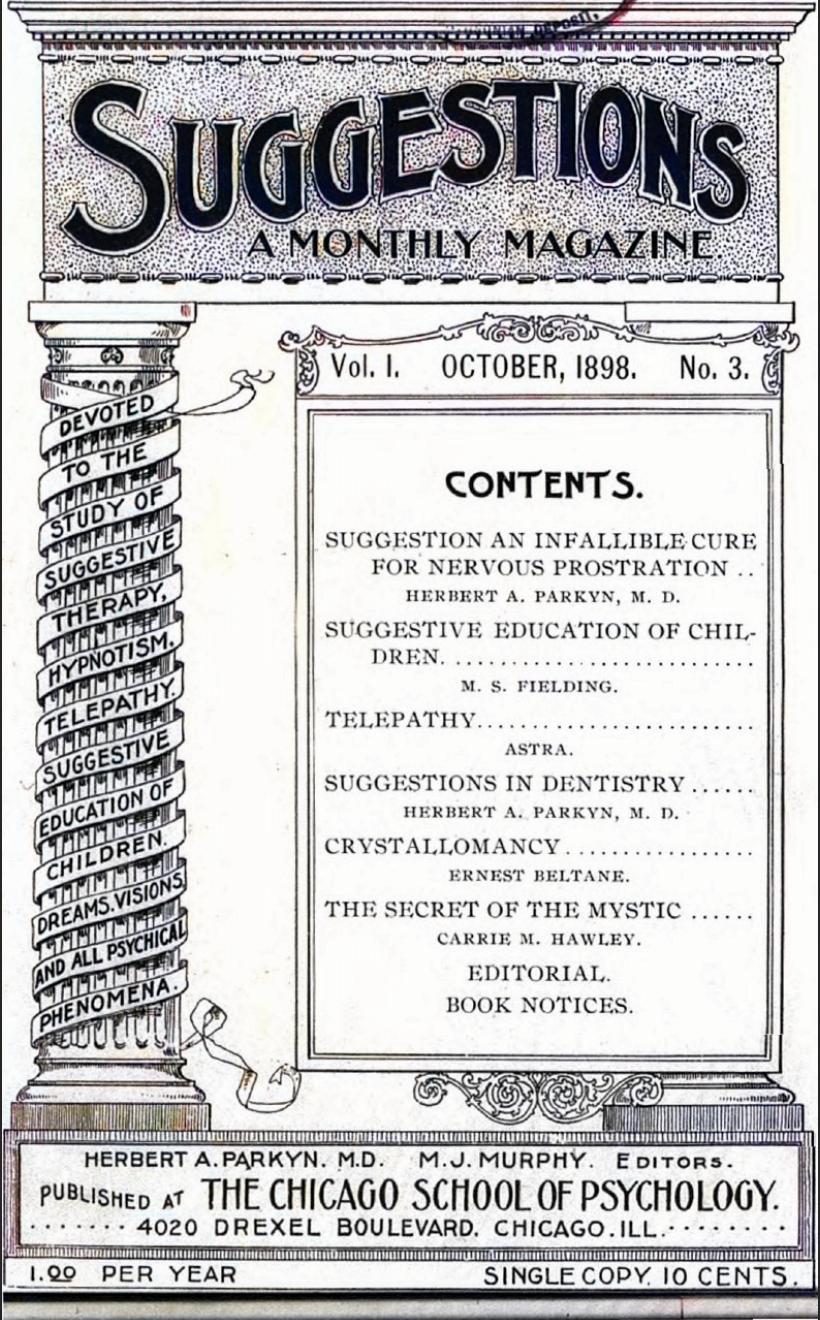
Suggestions, October 1898.

Suggestion became the central publication through which Parkyn systematized and distributed the Law of Suggestion during a formative period in American mental science. Operating within a coordinated circle of affiliated journals and publishing enterprises, the magazine ensured that its terminology, methods, and interpretive framework were consistently reinforced across multiple outlets.

It served as a central platform through which Parkyn developed and advanced influential writers within the mental science movement. Contributors such as William Walker Atkinson and Larkin first gained prominence in its pages, where their ideas were aligned with the Law of Suggestion and presented to a serious readership. Once their names carried weight among the movement’s thinkers, and where Suggestion’s more scientific tone might limit their reach to general audiences, Parkyn would position them in more accessible venues. In this way, Suggestion functioned as a coordinating center that strengthened and distributed a shared intellectual voice across multiple periodicals.

Through this process, Suggestion functioned not merely as a periodical but as a distribution center for a standardized vocabulary of mental causation. Its repeated emphasis on disciplined suggestion, character formation, and practical application helped embed the Law of Suggestion into the wider culture of New Thought, mental science and practical psychology in the United States.

== Contributors to Suggestion ==
Contributors to Suggestion were drawn largely from Parkyn's immediate circle and the extended network of practitioners trained through his Chicago School of Psychology and its affiliates. These included physicians, educators, authors, and professional hypnotists who applied suggestion in medical practice, public lecturing, stage performance, and correspondence instruction.

- Herbert A. Parkyn
- Henry Wood
- Thomson Jay Hudson
- William Walker Atkinson
- George W. Carey
- William James
- Stanley LeFevre Krebs
- Henry Harrison Brown
- Edwin Hartley Pratt
- Elmer R. Gates
- William Xavier Sudduth
- Frank Channing Haddock
- Isaac Newton Vail
- Edgar L. Larkin
- A. Victor Segno
- Schobey Fremont Meachem
- Charles Gilbert Davis
- E. Virgil Neal
- George C. Pitzer
- C. O. Sahler
- Yogi Ramacharaka
- William C. Dobson
- William Juvenal Colville
- Mary Scott Fielding
- George Bieser
- George Dutton
- J. C. F. Grumbine
- Henry Clay Hodges
- Elmer Ellsworth Carey
- Kate Atkinson Boehme
- Eugene Del Mar
- R. Swinburne Clymer
- E. Hood Corson
- Henry Harrison Brown
- Harry Gaze
- Frederick William Southworth
- Roger Sherman
- Elbert Hubbard
- Elizabeth Towne
- William Towne
- Isaac K. Funk
- Carrie M. Hawley
- Charles Brodie Patterson
- M. J. Murphy
- Albert Whitehouse
- Franklin H. Heald
- W. R. C. Latson
- Ernest Beltane
- Eleanor Kirk
- P. J. Mahon
- C. Edwin Goodell
- B. F. Austin
- Alvan C. Halphide
- Sheldon Leavitt
- Henry W. Roby
- Cleveland Moffett
- Ellis Woodbury Rideout
- Franklin H. Heald
- Henry Frank
- C. W. Young
- Horatio W. Dresser
- Lorenzo Wellington Billingsley
- Mark Henry Lackersteen
- Ella Wheeler Wilcox
