= Herbert A. Parkyn =

Canadian psychologist (1870–1927)

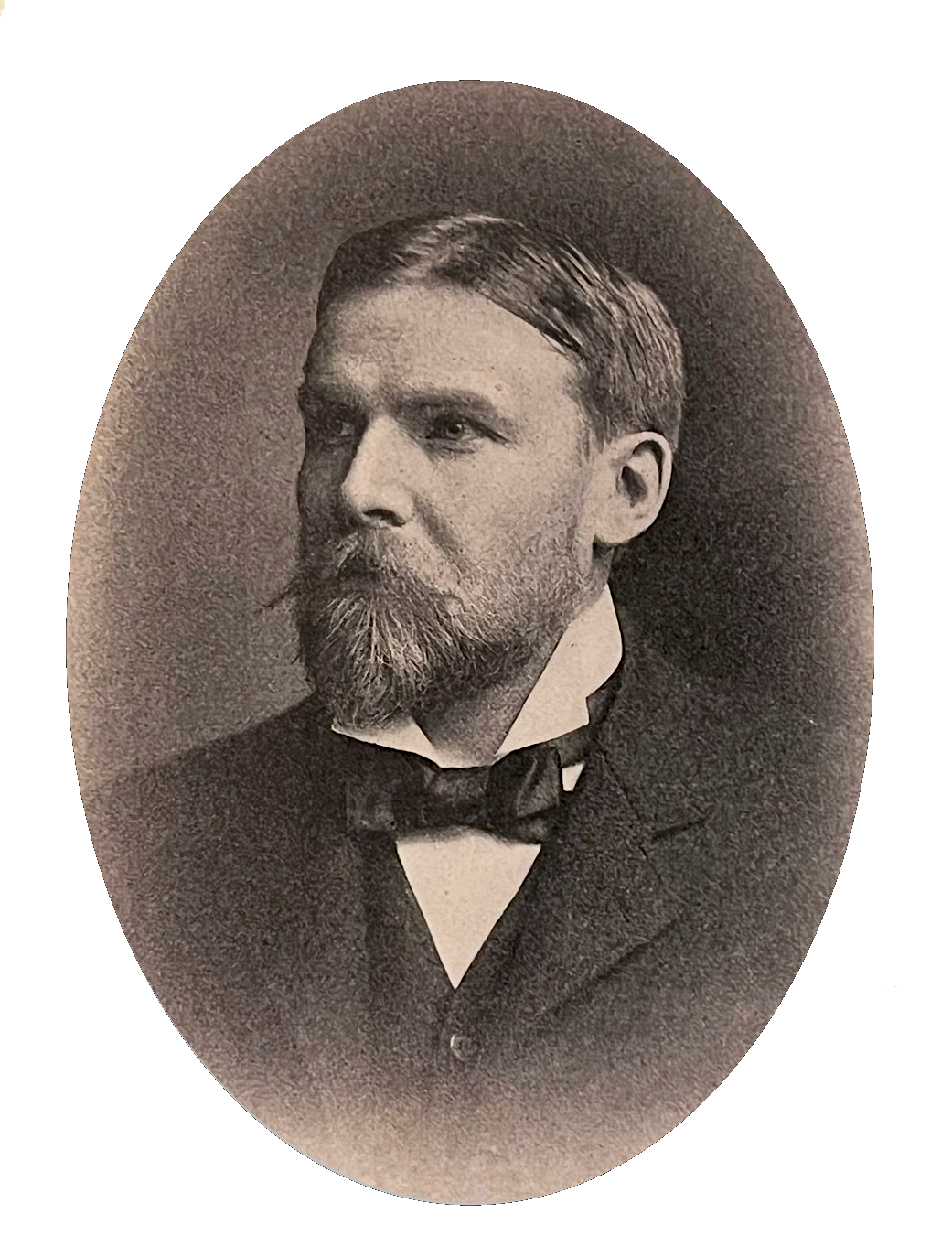
- Parkyn in 1900
- Born: December 24, 1870; Goderich, Ontario, Canada
- Died: December 22, 1927 (aged 56); Highland Park, Illinois, U.S.
- Resting place: Cimetière Mont-Royal
- Education: McGill University
- Occupations: Doctor; author
- Writing career
- Period: 1896–1926
- Subjects: Psychology; suggestion; autosuggestion; hypnosis
- Notable works: Auto-Suggestion; A Mail Course in Suggestive Therapeutics and Hypnotism
- Movements: New Thought; New Psychology

Signature
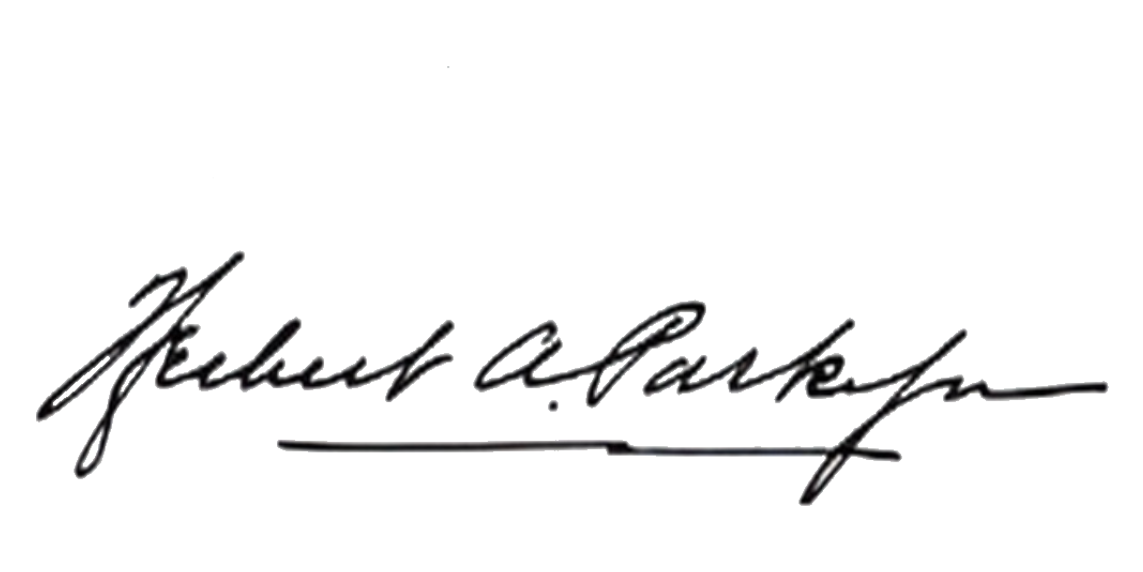

Herbert Arthur Parkyn (December 24, 1870 – December 22, 1927) was a Canadian psychologist, teacher, and author who became a leading figure in the New Thought movement. He founded the Chicago School of Psychology, the first institution in America to teach suggestive therapeutics and established The Hypnotic Magazine and Suggestion magazine. His book Auto-Suggestion, was one of the first to introduce the study of self-suggestion through affirmations, preceding by decades the international recognition later given to the work of Émile Coué.

Parkyn was also a distinguished college athlete, winning championships in both hockey and football and is credited with organizing the first international hockey game.

== Family and early life ==
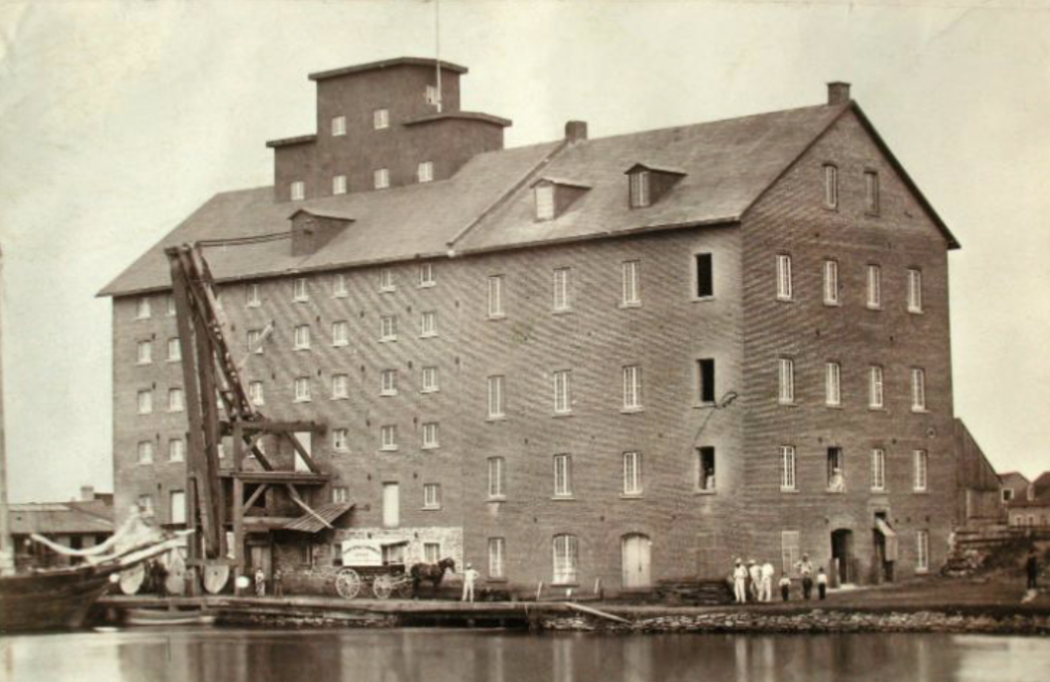
The Mount Royal Mills.

Parkyn was born in Goderich, Ontario, Canada, to Margaret Beale Atkinson and Colonel James Parkyn. His paternal grandfather, William Parkyn, launched the first iron steamships on the St. Lawrence River and harnessed the hydraulic power of the Lachine Canal for his Mount Royal Mills and the development of Cote Saint Paul, including constructing Saint Paul's Union Church.

His father, James Parkyn, was involved in the milling industry and oversaw the construction of the Lake of the Woods Mills, which at the time was one of the largest milling facilities in the world, in Keewatin, near Winnipeg, Manitoba. On his mother's side, his uncle William Kirby Atkinson served as mayor of Ailsa Craig, Ontario, and later was the owner and editor of Leader-Telegram, a daily newspaper in Eau Claire, Wisconsin.

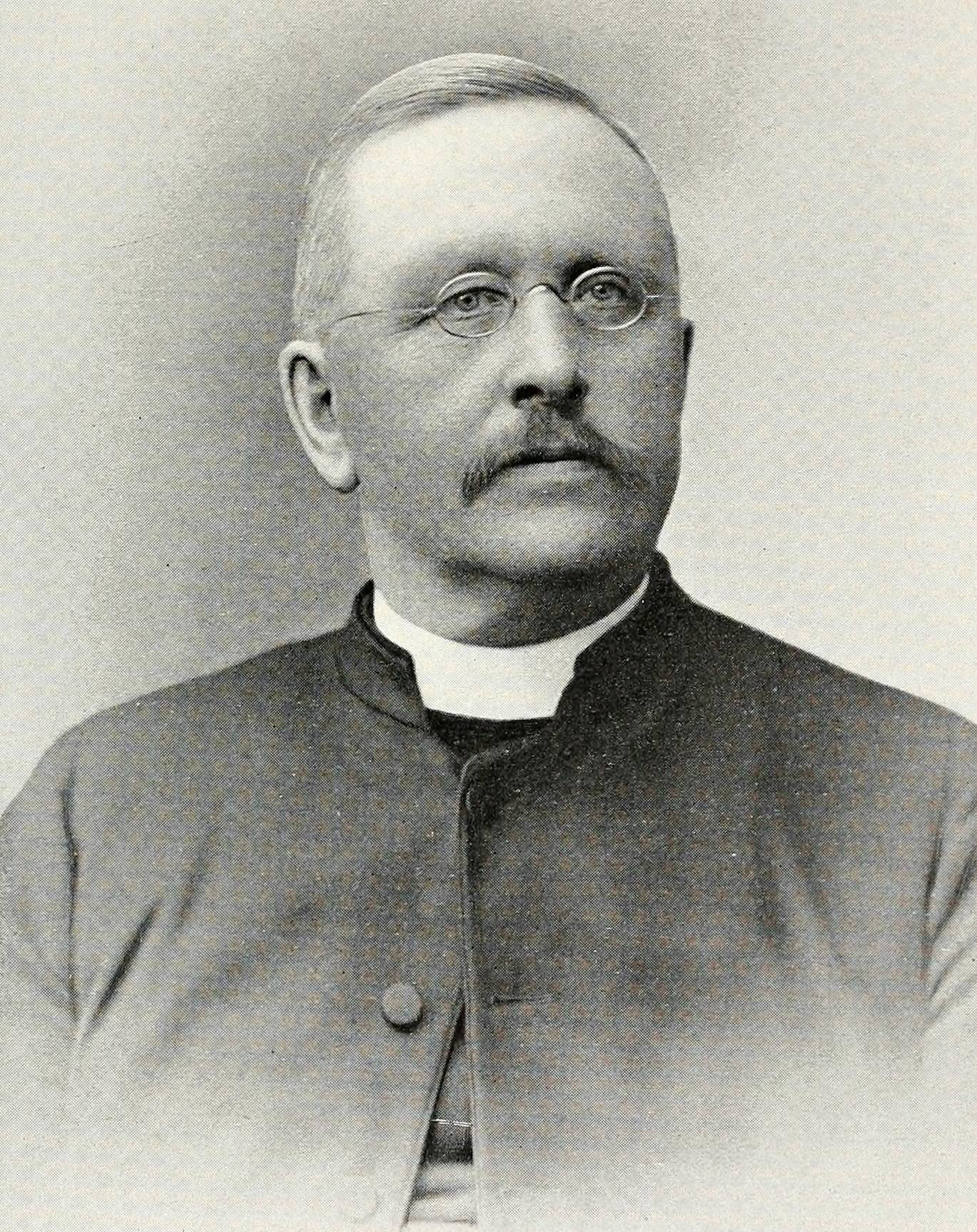
Rev. Samuel Nelson Jackson

Parkyn was close to his relatives on his paternal aunt's side. Rev. Samuel Nelson Jackson, the husband of Parkyn's aunt Mary Ann Parkyn, was a physician and Congregational minister who led the Congregational Union of Ontario and Quebec, headed the Congregational Publishing Company, and was a faculty member of the Congregational College at McGill University, where he wrote A Handbook of Congregationalism.

Parkyn grew up with his Jackson cousins, including Horatio Nelson Jackson, the first person to drive across the United States; John Holmes Jackson, a two-term mayor of Burlington, Vermont; and Samuel Hollister Jackson, who was Lieutenant Governor of Vermont and who married Parkyn's sister, making them both cousins and brothers-in-law.

Parkyn's exposure to the ideas that would later shape the New Thought movement were influenced by Henry Wood, who was a foundational figure of the movement. Wood was a close family friend to Rev. Samuel Nelson Jackson and his two brothers—having graduated with Joseph Addison Jackson from the Barre Academy—and his cousin, Cora Augusta Wood, who was married to John Henry Jackson. The Jackson and Wood families were both prominent in Barre, Vermont, where they held civic positions and shared business ventures.

== Medical education ==
In 1888, Parkyn entered Queen's University in Kingston, Ontario. After graduating in 1891, Parkyn passed the examinations of the College of Physicians and Surgeons of Ontario and received his medical degree from the Queen's University Faculty of Medicine.

After graduating, Parkyn pursued postgraduate studies at McGill University and later continued at the University of Toronto Medical College, where he studied mental sciences and anesthesia. While completing postgraduate work in Toronto, Parkyn, from 1892 to 1894, operated a private medical practice focused on hypnotic therapeutics, reporting over 240 successful cases. During this time he also formed and managed the Incandescent Gas Light Exchange with his father. In 1894, he enrolled at the University of Minnesota, where he began collaborating with the dean of the Dental School, Dr. W. Xavier Sudduth, on hypnotism experiments.

== Sporting career ==
During his years in medical school Parkyn was also active in collegiate hockey and football as a player and as president and secretary of several clubs.

=== In Canada ===
==== Hockey ====
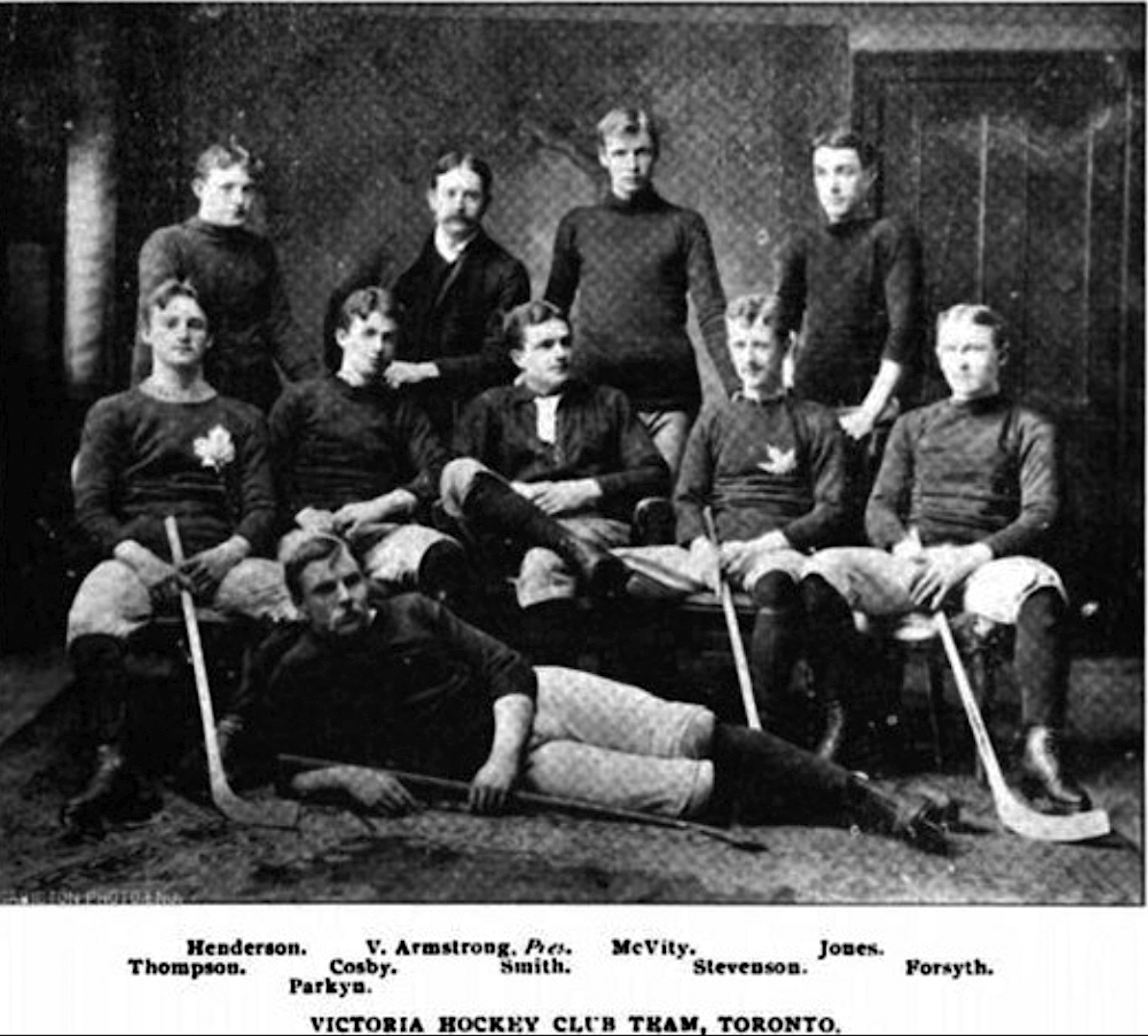
Victoria Hockey Club Team 1893, Herbert A. Parkyn laying across the bottom.

While at Queen's University, Parkyn organized one of the first recorded hockey games in North America, an 1886 match against the Royal Military College on Kingston Harbour. It's been called the first organized game between two Ontario teams and the beginning of the oldest rivalry in hockey. In 1888, as captain and secretary of the Queen's University Hockey Club, Parkyn led the squad to the first Kingston championship, facing the Rideau Hall Rebels, a team that included two of Lord Stanley's sons.

He continued his hockey career at the University of Toronto, captaining both the Varsity and University College clubs and as secretary of the newly formed Ontario Hockey Association, where he helped establish rules for Ontario's participation in the Stanley Cup and coordinated intercollegiate and club play across the province.

==== Football ====
Parkyn was also a standout football player in the rugby-style Canadian game, playing center halfback and fullback. He was Queen’s leading scorer and helped the team reach the 1890 Ontario Rugby Football Union (ORFU) Cup final. In 1892, he played for the University of Toronto "Varsity" team that won the ORFU Cup, and in 1893 he returned to Queen’s as honorary vice president, helping them win both the ORFU Cup and the Dominion Football Championship while also playing for the Toronto Athletic Club. He was considered one of the best kickers in Ontario at the time.

His brother, William Parkyn II, also excelled at football, captaining the Windsor University team before his sudden death from malarial fever in 1885 shortly after returning from a game against the Michigan Wolverines.

=== In the United States ===
==== Minnesota Golden Gophers ====
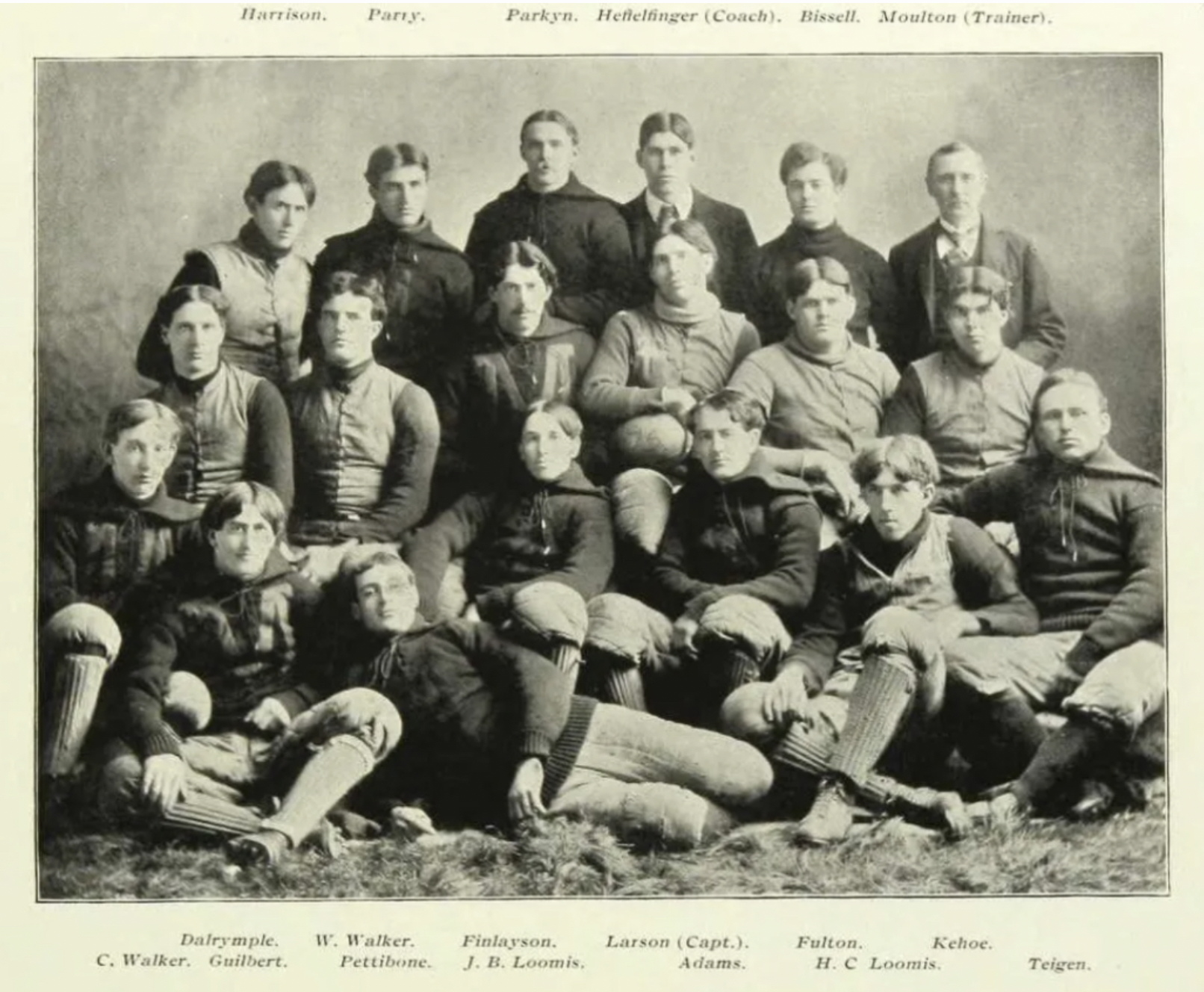
Minnesota Golden Gophers football team 1895

In the fall of 1894, Parkyn joined the Minnesota Golden Gophers football team. Parkyn played fullback, handling most of the running, punting, and kicking duties, and was known for reliably drop-kicking goals from up to 40 yards. Parkyn led the team in scoring during the 1894 and 1895 seasons. His notoriety on campus as a hypnotist earned him the nicknames "the Hypnotizer" and "Svengali Parkyn".

After the Gophers' 1895 win against the University of Wisconsin, Harper's Weekly reporter Caspar Whitney accused the school of paying Parkyn $500 to play football, calling him a "tramp athlete." Although such payments were not yet banned, the claim fueled growing debate over amateurism. Minnesota denied it and urged Parkyn to remain silent.

The article, leaked days before Minnesota's game with the University of Michigan and placed Parkyn at the center of a national scandal. The article singled out Parkyn more than any other player, and even though Michigan was also criticized, the piece contained clear errors, including naming Roger Sherman, a close friend of Parkyn, as Michigan's manager, which he wasn’t, and listing a player no longer on the roster. The controversy sparked a national debate and became one of the events leading to the formation of the Big Ten Conference.

When Parkyn later gave his account, he stated that Minnesota had promised him $500 to return for the 1895 season to cover travel and medical research, since he had already relocated to Chicago. The university not only failed to honor this agreement but also publicly denied it. Harper's Weekly later exposed this breach and the university's attempts to silence Parkyn.

==== University of Minnesota ====
In December 1894, Parkyn was selected to organize the University's winter sports program and focused on forming a hockey team. Using football players familiar with ice polo, he aimed to build a squad to compete with the best Canadian teams. He secured Athletic Park as a venue, and was elected director of Minnesota's first hockey team.

On February 18, 1895, Parkyn arranged for the Winnipeg Victorias to come to Athletic Park for the first international hockey match. Minnesota lost 11–3, but the game attracted many fans and hockey became a popular sport at the University. The Winnipeg team would shortly after claim the Stanley Cup and be crowned world champions.

After moving to Chicago in 1896, Parkyn continued organizing and leading new hockey teams. He formed a team with the Chicago Athletic Association, acting as both manager and captain. In 1901, he started another team, at the Kenwood Country Club, which competed regularly against club teams from across the Chicago area.

== Research into hypnotism ==
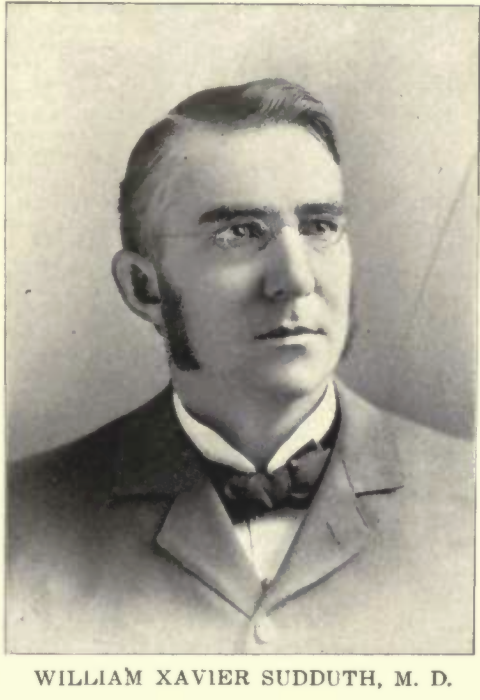
Dr. W. Xavier Sudduth

While playing football at Minnesota, Parkyn was also conducting research into hypnotism. His earlier medical practice in Toronto had established his reputation, particularly for his ability to induce deep hypnotic states quickly and consistently, prompting the stage mentalist Newmann the Great to state: "there was no better hypnotist than Dr. Parkyn".

Parkyn went to Minnesota to join Dr. W. Xavier Sudduth. Sudduth was a noted scientist and lecturer who had studied at the Nancy School, trained in Europe, spent fifteen years researching hypnotism, and was also dean of the Dental School. Parkyn wanted to experiment with the use of hypnotism as an anesthetic during dental surgery. Parkyn and Sudduth connected through Dr. John Holmes Jackson, Parkyn's cousin, who had studied dentistry under Sudduth in Philadelphia.

Parkyn's and Sudduth's relationship extended into athletics, where Sudduth was president of the newly formed Minnesota hockey team and also traveled with the football team as its mascot.

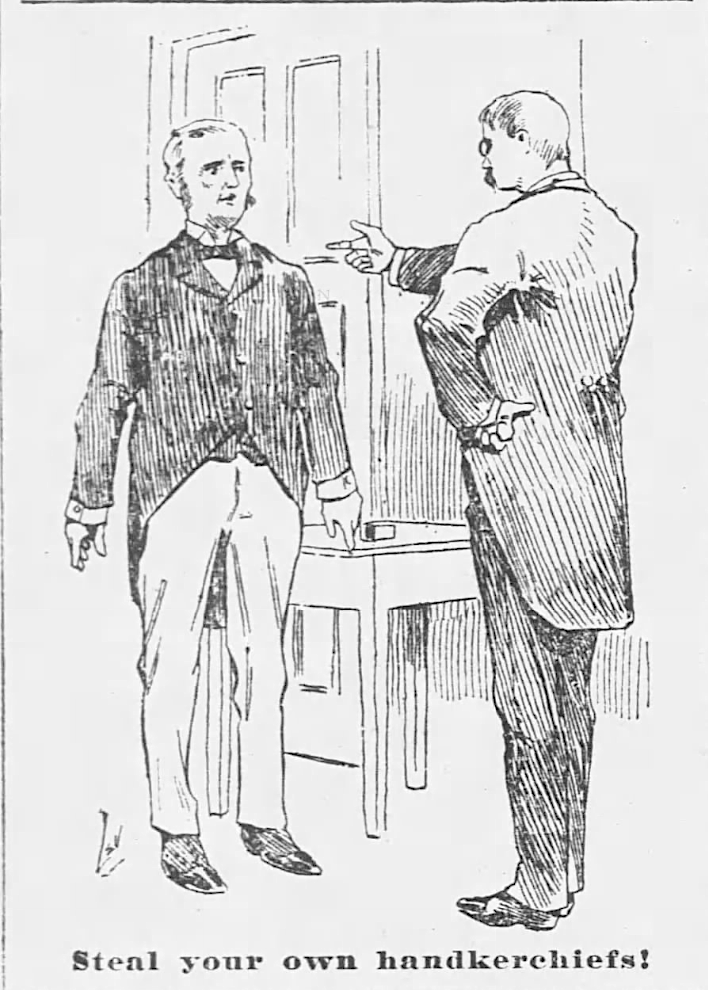
Parkyn trying to get a hypnotized subject to steal a handkerchief.

In 1894, Sudduth and Parkyn secured permission to introduce hypnotic therapeutics into the University's public clinics, making it the first public clinic in America to use hypnotism. Over the following year, they conducted more than 1,000 experiments using hypnosis as an alternative to anesthesia for procedures that ranged from complex tooth extractions to tumor removals. They also applied hypnotism to alleviate mental conditions such as addiction and stammering.

Parkyn and Sudduth argued that acting under hypnosis could not be used as a legal defense, maintaining that moral awareness remains intact under suggestion. They cited several cases in which defendants claimed innocence on the grounds they had been hypnotized, including one in Eau Claire that had received national attention but was dismissed as hysteria after Parkyn investigated it. At a demonstration before 50 professionals, Parkyn and Sudduth showed how hypnotized subjects refused instructions to commit minor crimes; despite reacting violently to imaginary dangers such as from rats or wolves, they refused to harm a human figure, even when threatened with fake stage weapons.

They held a demonstration at Eau Claire, Wisconsin, on April 20, 1895, to expose the techniques of stage mentalists who claimed to have the power of telepathy and mind reading. They performed feats such as finding objects while blindfolded, card identification, and thought reading. They then explained the feats as the result of methods such muscle reading, sleight of hand, and transferred impressions. Although the presentation was intended to demystify these phenomena, several attendees believed it was done with mystical powers.

=== Move to Chicago ===
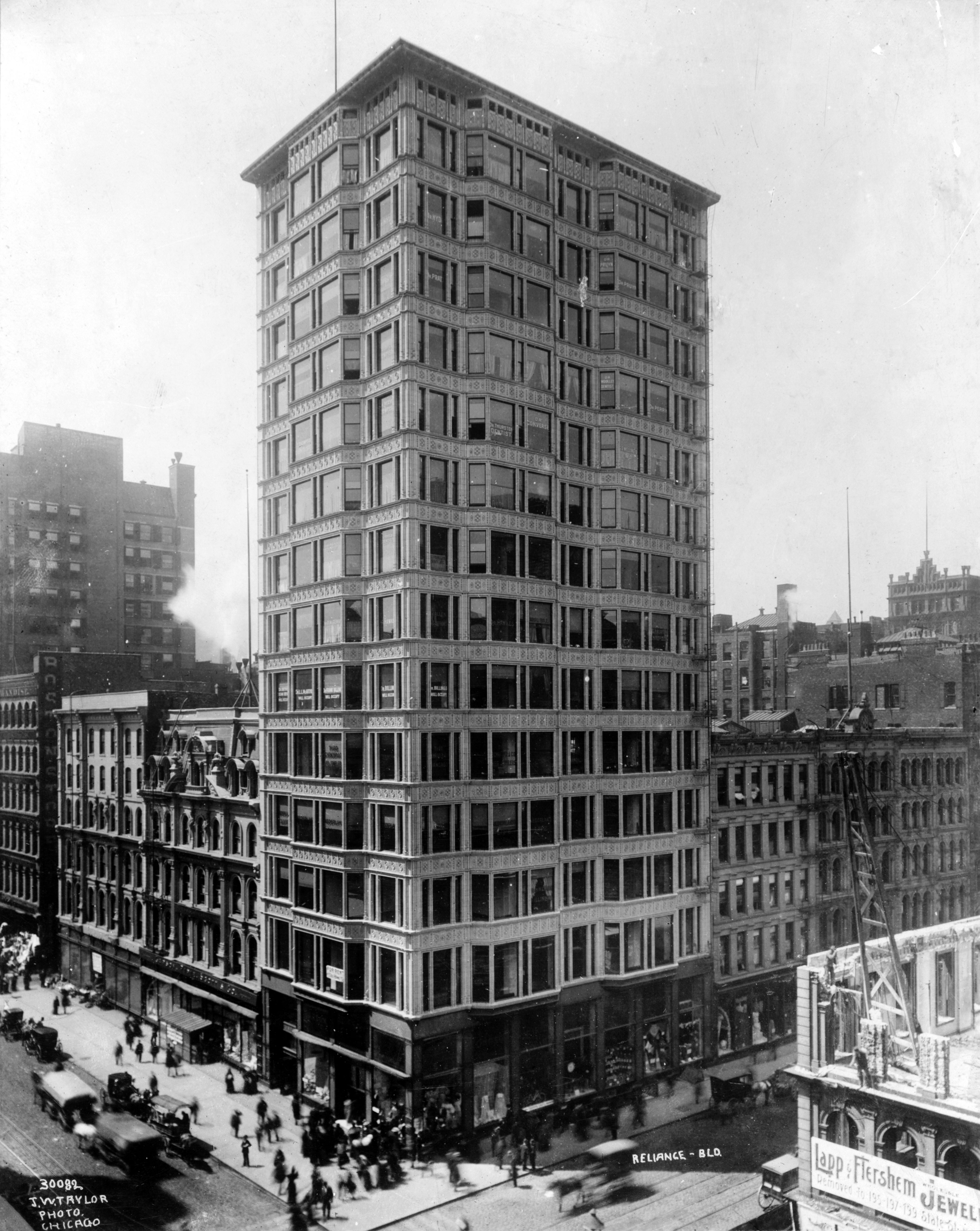
The Reliance Building, the location of Parkyn and Sudduth's office.

Parkyn and Sudduth's hypnotic experiments soon became controversial with members of the Minneapolis Dental Society which resented the attention the experiments were receiving and used the press to portray the work as dangerous and unscientific. Despite support from the university's leadership, public pressure led to the cancelling of the experiments in late 1894. Parkyn quickly opened a private medical office in Minneapolis, so that he and Sudduth could continue their experiments off campus.

In the spring of 1895, Sudduth resigned as dean at Minnesota and joined the University of Chicago, where Parkyn soon joined him. Together they opened an office at 100 State Street and began treating patients at the Oak Park and Hyde Park sanitariums with plans of opening a sanitarium fully devoted to hypnotic treatments.

They soon gained the support of Dr. William F. Waugh, dean of the Illinois Medical College, who partnered with the sanitarium project and offered Parkyn the newly created Chair of Psycho-Therapeutics at his college. In September 1895 their plans were abruptly delayed when Sudduth's father died, requiring him to go to San Francisco to settle the large estate. During his extended absence, Parkyn agreed to return to the University of Minnesota for the 1895 football season after multiple requests from the team and their offer of $500 to cover travel expenses and a medical office. Dr. Waugh agreed to defer Parkyn's appointment until the next term.

In February 1896, Parkyn returned to Chicago to be Chair of Psycho-Therapeutics at the Illinois Medical College and arranged to introduce hypnotic treatments into its public clinics. Initially, this was praised in the press as a progressive program, but ended up facing strong opposition from some of the faculty who publicly criticized the plan and threatened to resign. Under pressure, the college ultimately canceled the program. Parkyn remained with the college for several months as a lecturer, while establishing plans for his own independent hypnotic clinic.

=== Collaborations with Sydney Flower ===
In late 1895, the former journalist Sydney Blanshard Flower became Parkyn’s publicist and business manager as preparations began for opening a psychology school and public clinic in Chicago. Flower had worked with Parkyn in Winnipeg, where Flower had been an athlete and worked as a sports reporter.

After leaving the Winnipeg Free Press in December 1895, Flower and Parkyn met in Toronto, where Parkyn spent the holidays with his family, and began collaborating on Hypnotism Up to Date and A Study in Hypnotism as promotional books outlining Parkyn's theories and methods of hypnotic therapeutics.

In spring 1896, Flower joined Parkyn in Chicago, where Hypnotism Up to Date was published in April, followed by A Study in Hypnotism in May. Both were published by Charles H. Kerr & Company and later republished by the Psychic Publishing Company, founded by Parkyn and Flower in June 1896 as the publishing arm of their work on hypnotism.

=== Continued research ===
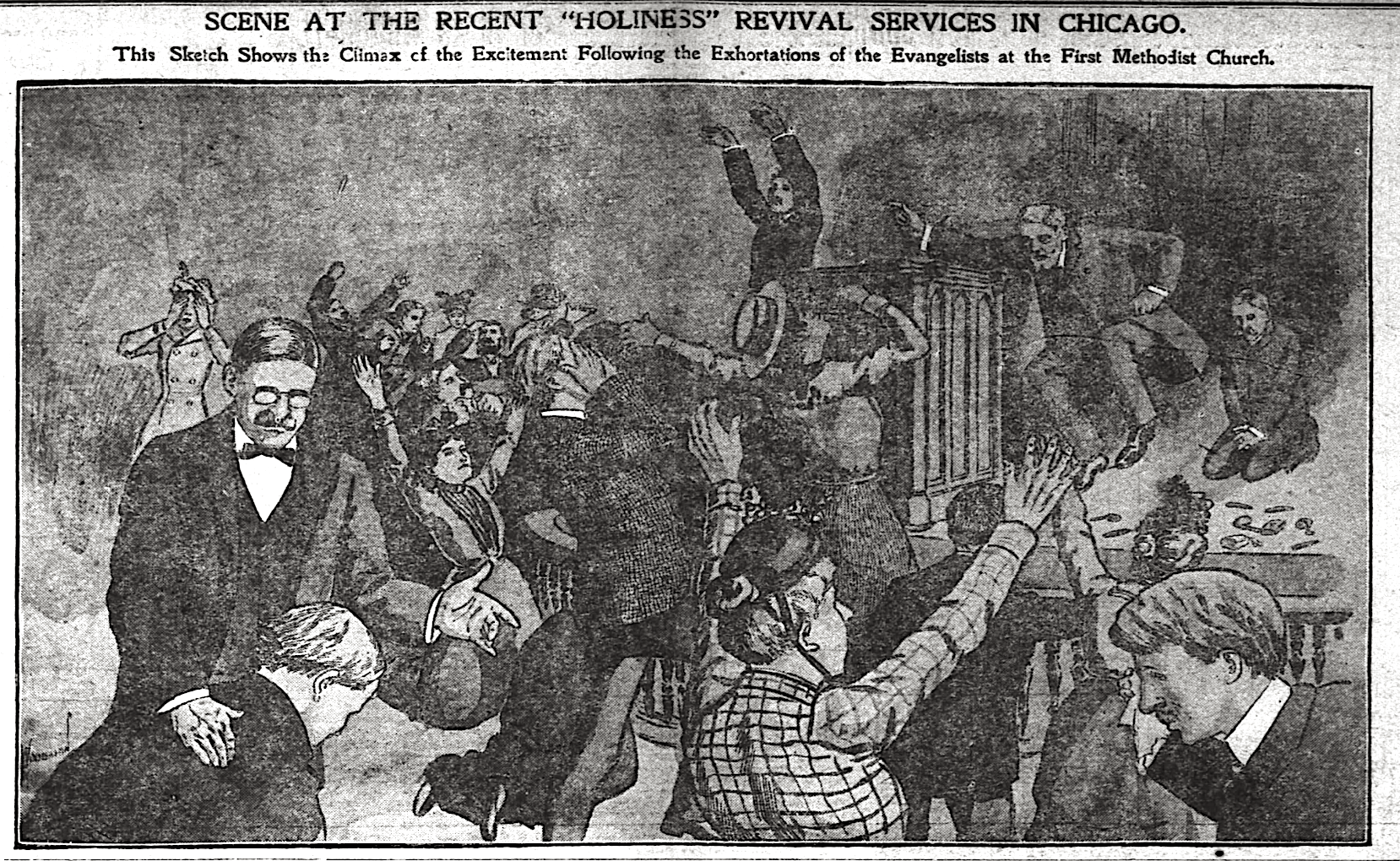
Dr. Parkyn experiments with suggestion at an Evangelist church service.

After returning to Chicago in April 1896, Sudduth resumed his collaboration with Parkyn, lecturing at the Chicago School, contributing to its publications, and jointly operating a local branch of the Society for Psychical Research.

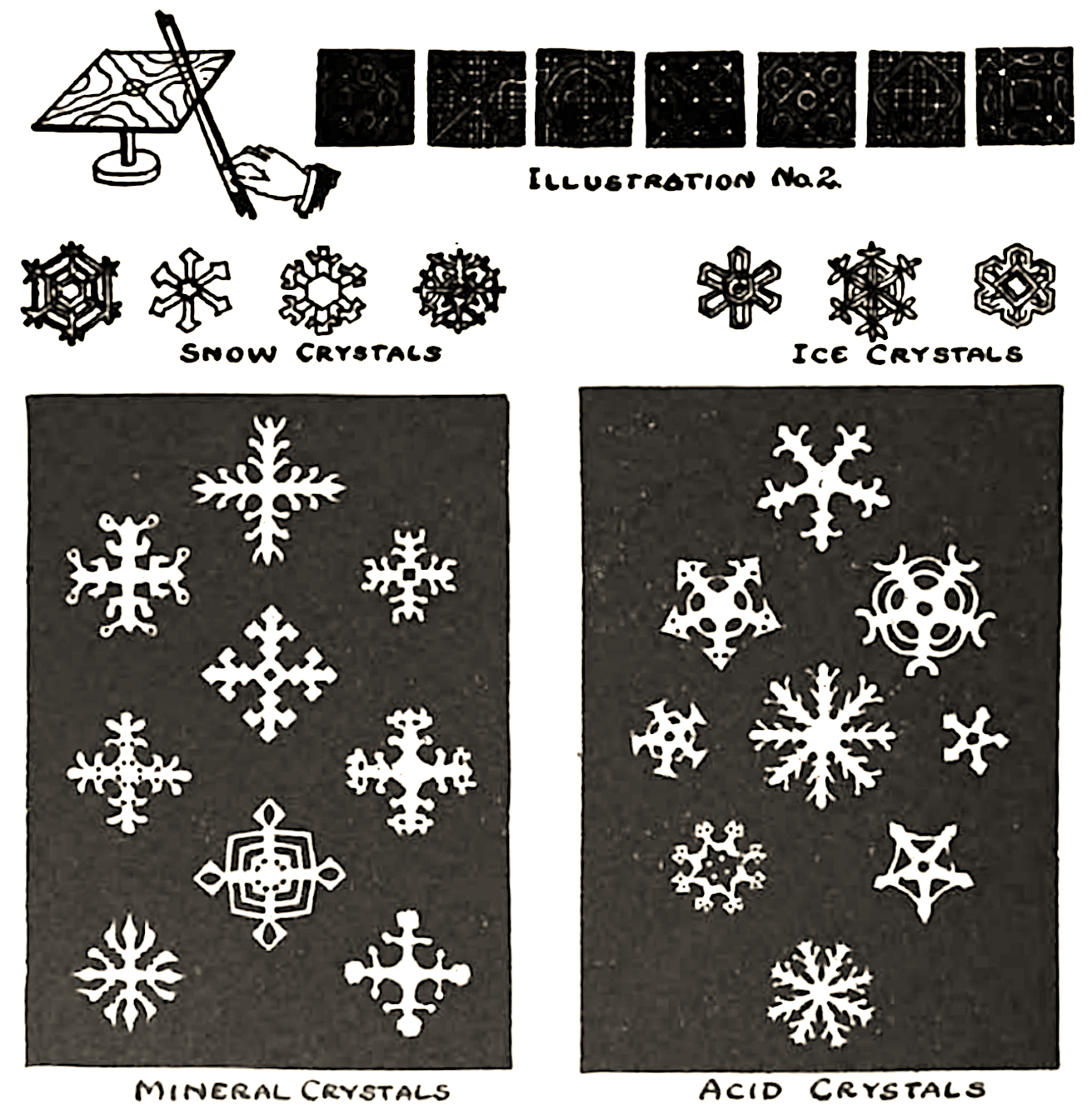
Parkyn studied cymatics to develop a system of defining each person's vibrational frequency

Working from their offices at 100 State Street, Parkyn and Sudduth studied occult and esoteric ideas through a scientific lens, believing that new methods in psychology would "find a basis of fact on which to govern all theories regarding metaphysical and psychical processes and to account for all occult phenomena."

They studied religious and ceremonial practices as structured ways of creating suggestible mental states, focusing on elements such as posture, repetition, music, incense, and ritual. They also examined how sound, light, and movement affect the mind, drawing on the Greek idea of harmony and the Hermetic principle "As above, so below". Using electrical devices, they recorded musical vibrations and converted them into visual forms resembling flowers and shells, which they viewed as evidence that natural forms correspond to sound.

Sudduth was the principal link in connecting this work to mainstream institutions through his positions at the Chicago Post-Graduate Medical School, the University of Chicago, and the Medico-Legal Society of New York; working with figures such as Dr. Mark Henry Lackersteen and Thomson Jay Hudson; and being a member in numerous professional societies, including the Society for Psychical Research of London and the Chicago Esoteric Extension Association, which was devoted to the study of sacred books and mysticism.

=== Suggestion applied to animals ===
Parkyn conducted experiments on animals using his fox terrier, Esau, to test whether the same psychological principles observed in humans applied to non-human subjects. Training the dog through suggestion rather than physical methods, Esau learned over thirty behaviors, including responding to written commands, signaling numbers, and performing various actions on cue. Parkyn presented these results as evidence that suggestion could influence behavior across species, arguing that the same principles of attention, expectation, and unconscious response operated in both animals and humans.

=== The Magnetic Healing Cup ===
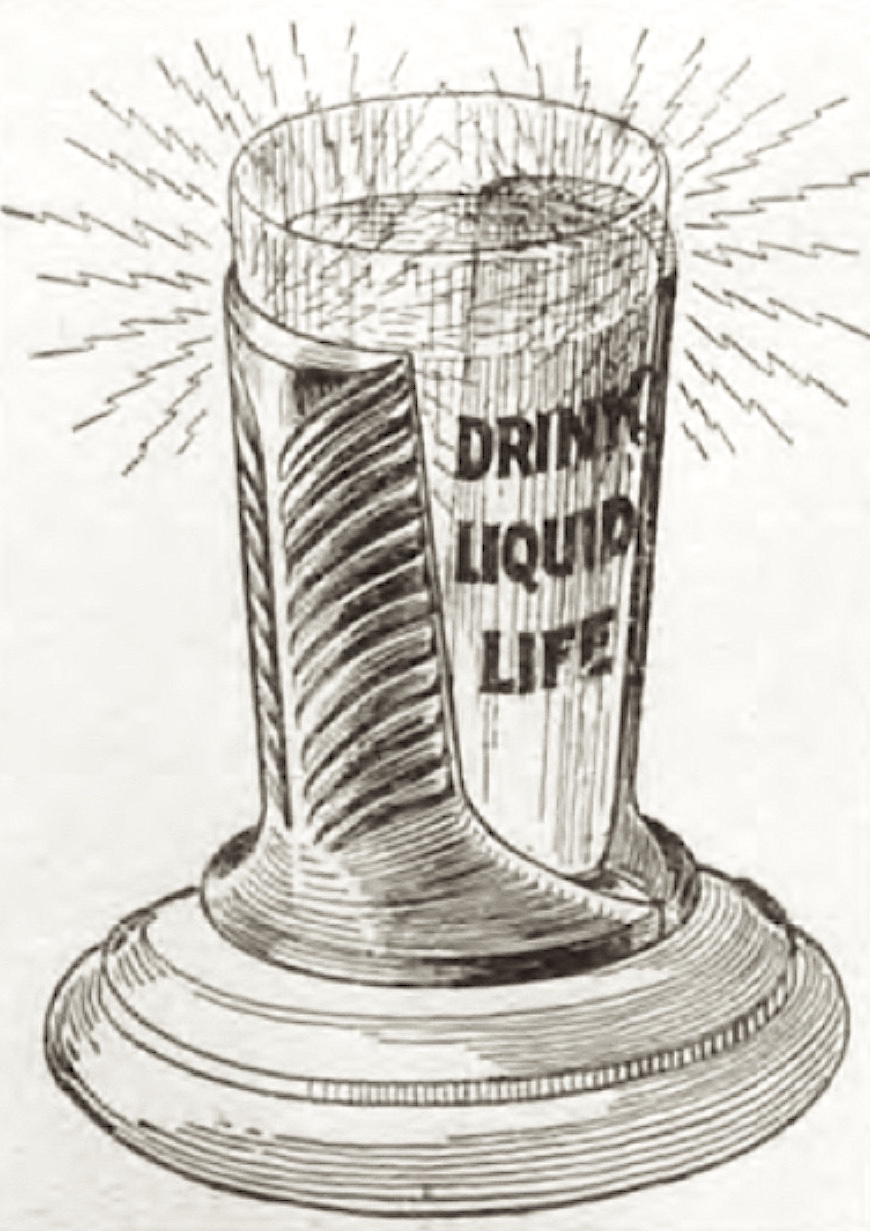
The Magnetic Healing Cup

In 1900, Parkyn developed and patented the Magnetic Healing Cup, which was promoted as a concentrated "vital healing force", and as "the last and greatest discovery of the nineteenth century". Marketed through his offices at 4000 Cottage Grove Avenue, it was designed to test whether a physical object could intensify suggestion by giving patients a tangible focus for belief. Parkyn distributed the cups without charge to patients who reported their conditions, using their responses to collect data for a controlled experiment on how belief, focused through a physical object, could enhance suggestive therapy.

== Educational establishments ==
=== The Chicago School of Psychology ===
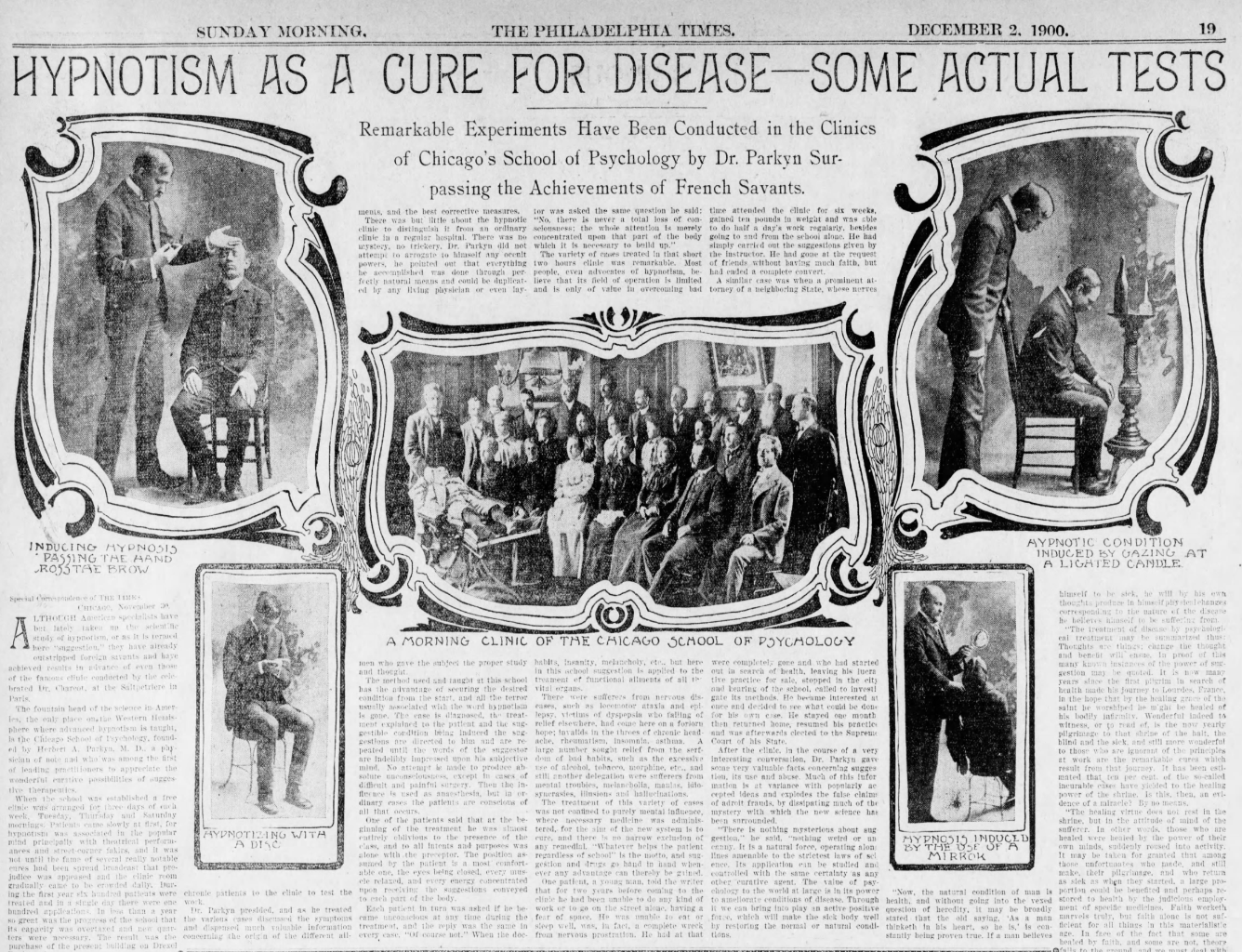
Feature on the Chicago school in the Philadelphia Times, Sunday, 1900

In June 1896, Parkyn founded the Chicago School of Psychology, the first American institution to teach suggestive therapeutics. Sydney Flower served as secretary; and Parkyn's father, James Parkyn, who relocated from Toronto to Chicago, financed the enterprise and served as president. The institution opened a free public clinic, where cases were treated through hypnotic suggestion, without the use of medication.

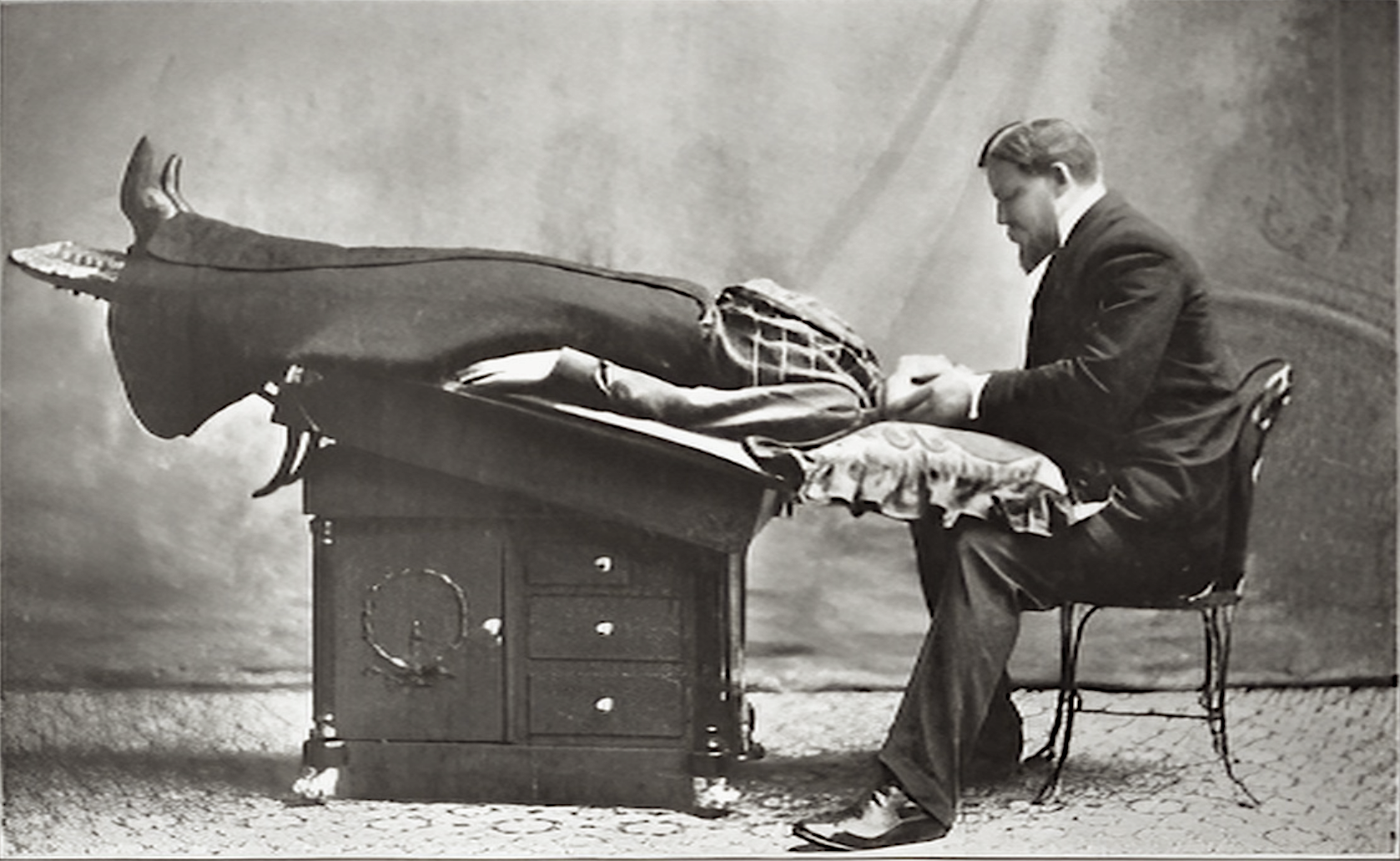
Parkyn performing hypnosis

At the school, Parkyn taught that all effective healing rests on "the power of the mind to help itself, and so to help the body". He described this power as "a part of the divine nature which is every man’s birthright", and that it operates independently of religious belief, being "as perfect in the atheist as in the religious fanatic".

He taught that psychology underlies every successful system of treatment and that no method is complete without understanding mental law. He criticized physicians who ignored natural recuperative processes and metaphysical healers who rejected medical treatment. According to Parkyn, mental influence alone was not sufficient in all cases, and effective treatment depended on combining psychological and medical approaches to produce the best results. He also heavily promoted auto-suggestion, teaching that repeated, self-directed thought could influence health and behavior through the subconscious. More than 1,000 students trained at the school, many of whom later became prominent in the New Thought movement.

=== The College of Psychical Sciences and Unfoldment ===
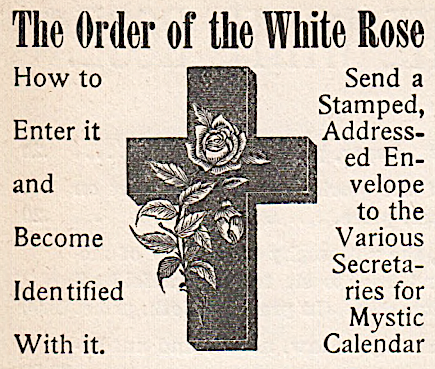
The Order of the White Rose

In late 1899, Parkyn became chair of Suggestive Therapeutics at the College of Psychical Sciences and Unfoldment, which was founded by J. C. F. Grumbine. The school taught subjects such as psychometry, clairvoyance, and psychopathy, and operated as the headquarters of the Order of the White Rose, a Rosicrucian society. Located in Chicago at 3960 Langley Avenue, just a few blocks from Parkyn's school, the college held "Parlors of the Order of the White Rose", offering lectures on "the secrets and mysteries of Magic and Occultism" and "the mystic and potential powers of Divinity and Illumination". Parkyn was close to the Order and endorsed its official organ, stating: "I consider Immortality the very best of the psychical publications". Parkyn and Grumbine shared a focus on separating disciplined psychical research from what they called "occult rubbish", criticizing Theosophy's use of "Oriental phraseology" and "mystic or cabalistic symbology" as obscuring practical understanding.

=== The University of Psychic Science ===
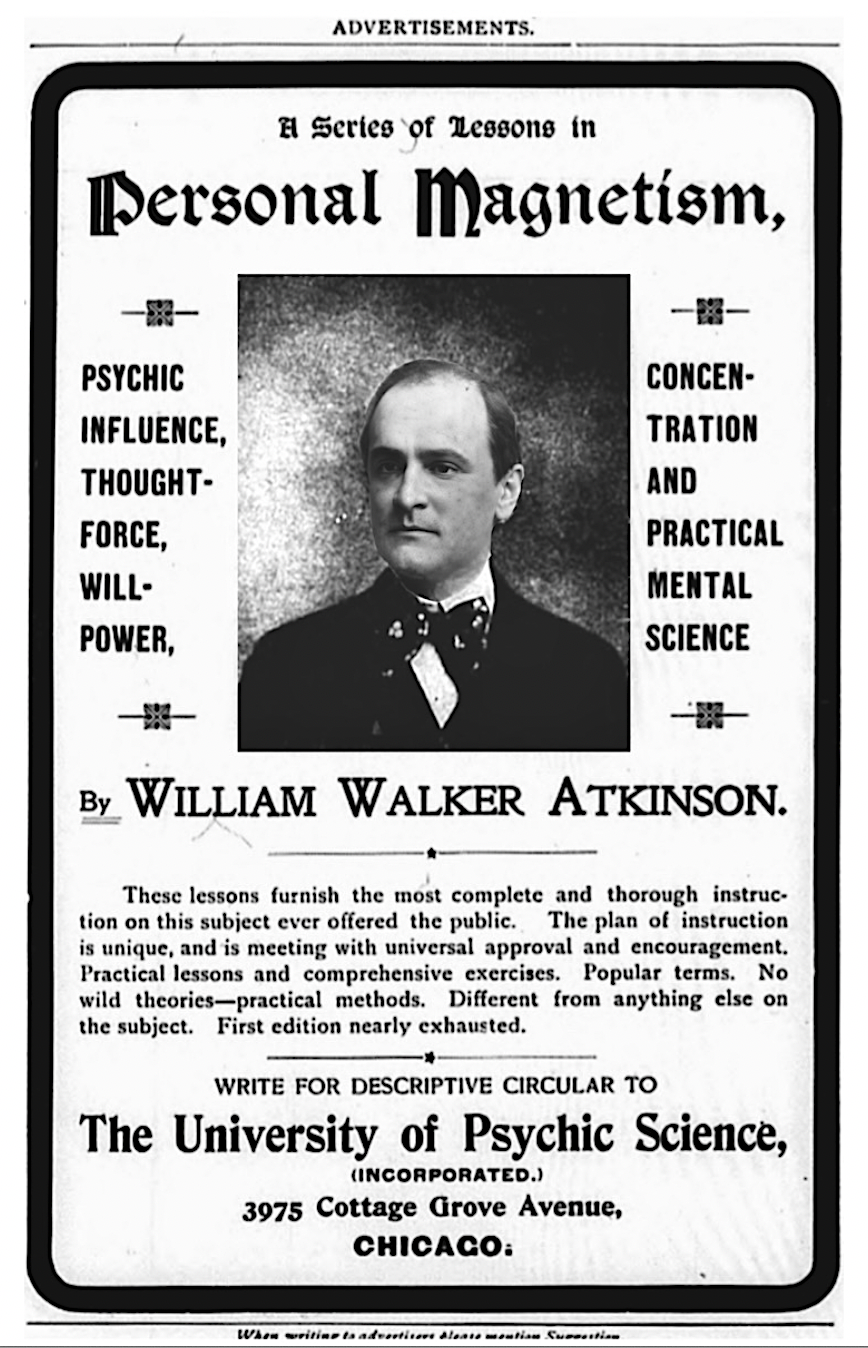
Atkinson at Parkyn's University of Psychic Science

In 1900, Parkyn founded the University of Psychic Science located at 3975 Cottage Grove Avenue, as a primary center for teaching personal magnetism, mental influence, will power, and concentration as practical tools for everyday life. It was to be the nucleus of a network of affiliated schools of Psychic Science, along with Psychic Research groups and clubs throughout the country and abroad.

Sydney B. Flower traveled to multiple cities to organize affiliated "Schools of Psychic Science" and to establish the Psychic Club of America, which later published the New Thought magazine as its official organ.

Parkyn appointed William Walker Atkinson as the first instructor at the University where he offered a series of lessons that blended Parkyn's teachings on the Law of Suggestion with the emerging theories of vibration, thought transference, and mental polarity.

== Publishing career ==
In August 1896, Parkyn and Flower founded The Hypnotic Magazine as the organ of the Chicago School of Psychology; the magazine aimed at promoting the medical use of hypnotism and suggestion. Edited by Flower, its central feature was Parkyn’s detailed clinical case reports which served as a valuable practical resource for physicians and students. It had regular contributions from prominent figures in psychology, medicine, and psychical research, including Thomson Jay Hudson, Dr. Sudduth, Dr. Mark Henry Lackersteen, and Xenophon LaMotte Sage.

=== Suggestion magazine ===
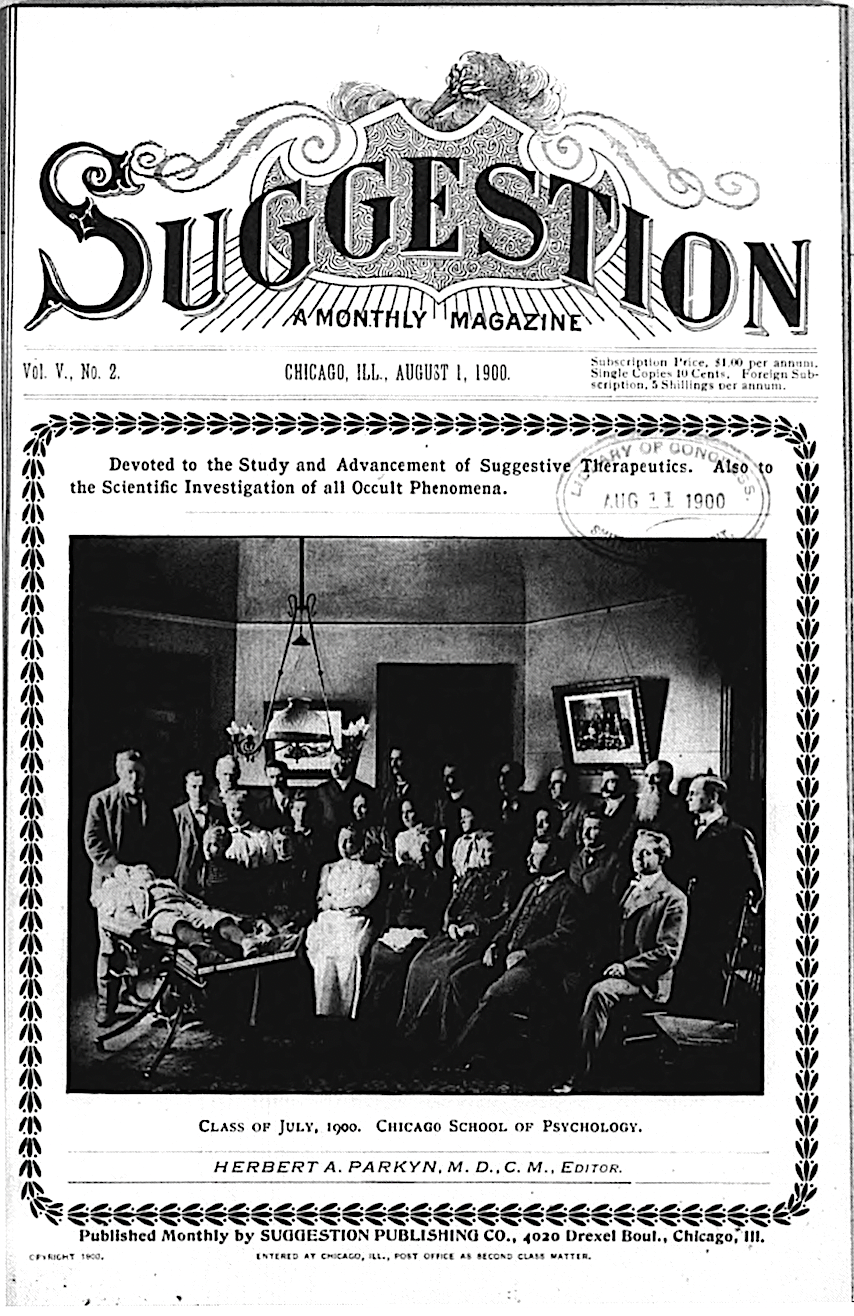
Suggestion magazine

In August 1898, Parkyn launched the journal Suggestion (initially titled Suggestions), presented as the official continuation of The Hypnotic Magazine and featuring what it termed "choice literary gems by the world's best known Mystics". Edited by Parkyn, the magazine focused on advanced and experimental inquiry into suggestive therapeutics, hypnotism, telepathy, and psychical phenomena, while excluding spiritism. Parkyn said many phenomena labeled supernatural could be explained through natural psychological laws and warranted systematic scientific study. Suggestion quickly became a leading journal for serious, scientifically grounded exploration of the mental sciences.

In November 1906, Parkyn sold Suggestion to Henry Clay Hodges, a Detroit multi-millionaire and industrialist who had been associated with the magazine for years by advertising his multi-volume Science and Key of Life series and as a contributor on the topic of astrology. Hodges pledged to maintain the magazine in the same form and spirit, changing its name to The Stellar Ray.

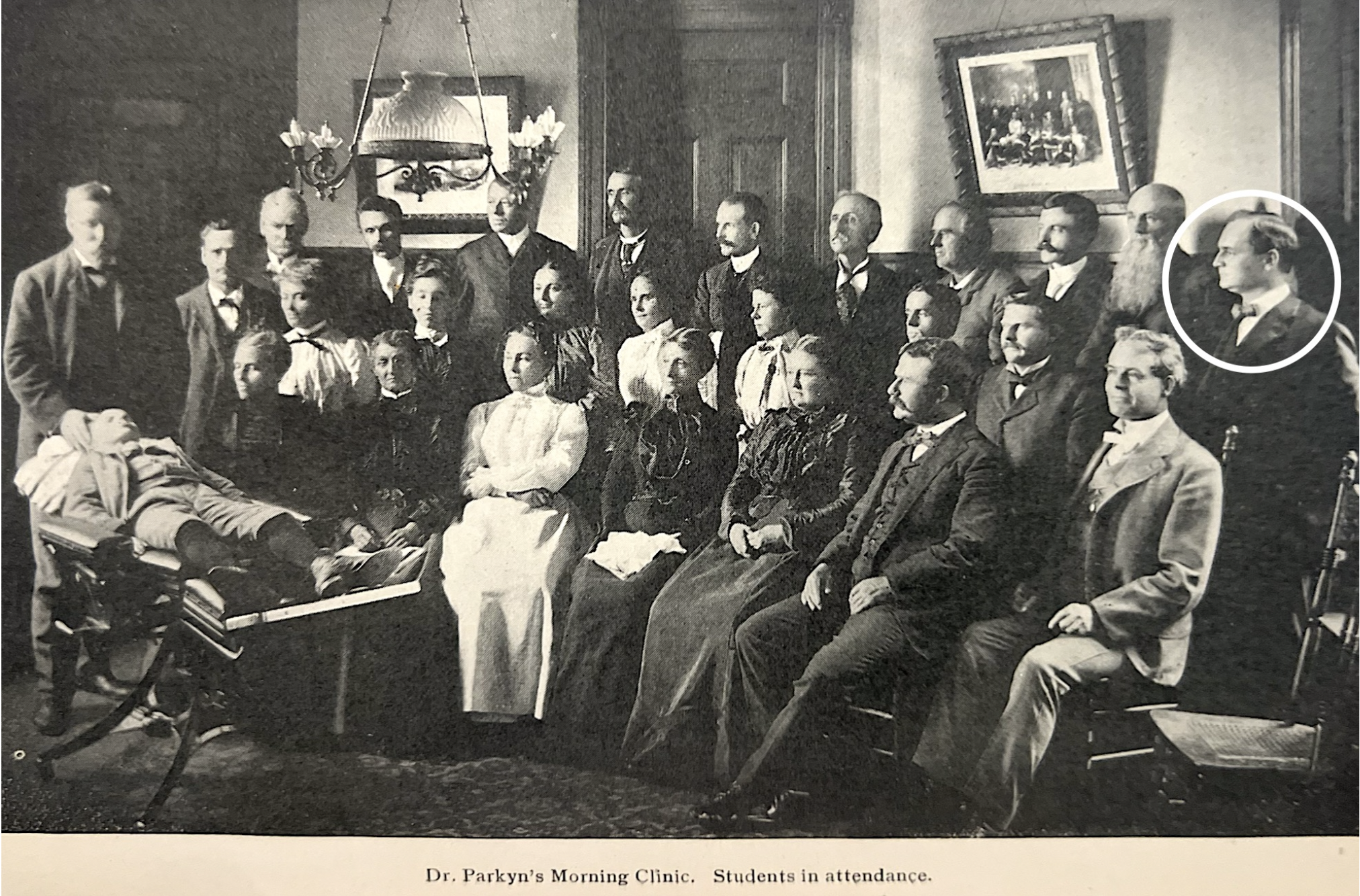
William Walker Atkinson pictured as part of the Chicago School of Psychology class of July 1900.

William Walker Atkinson became involved with Parkyn in spring 1900 after seeking treatment at the Chicago School. After receiving therapy, he became a student at the school and collaborated with Parkyn for years, eventually becoming one of the most-read authors in the New Thought movement. In December 1900, Atkinson's first New Thought writings appeared in Suggestion, and in February 1901 he became associate editor. Parkyn promoted Atkinson's work under the catch phrase "Atkinsonia", presenting it as an extension of the Law of Suggestion beyond clinical therapeutics and into practical everyday methods of self-culture and thought-force for a metaphysical audience. Atkinson emphasized core elements of Parkyn's teachings with articles such as "Thought Takes Form in Action", "The Real Self", and "I Can and I Will". These articles were then compiled for his first book, published by Parkyn, initially titled A Series of Lessons in Personal Magnetism, Psychic Influence, Thought-Force, Concentration, Will-Power and Practical Mental Science. The book was then retitled to Thought=Force in Business and Everyday Life.

=== Mail course ===
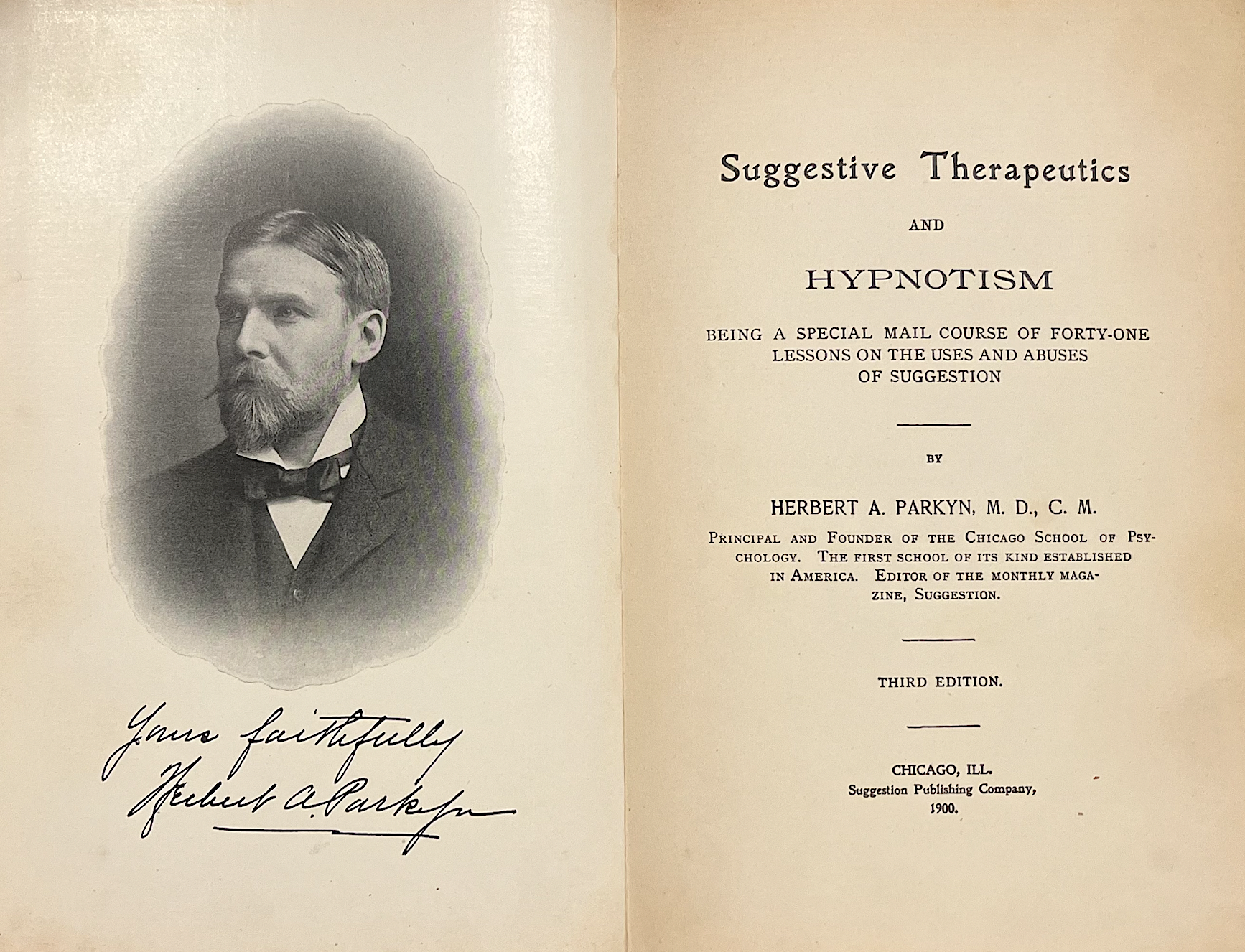
Parkyn's mail course

In 1898, alongside the launch of Suggestion, Parkyn issued his Special Mail Course in Suggestive Therapeutics and Hypnotism, a forty-one-lesson course based on over 5,000 cases and presented as a complete system of instruction. The course was widely praised by physicians and students for its clarity and effectiveness.

=== Hypnotism Up To Date ===
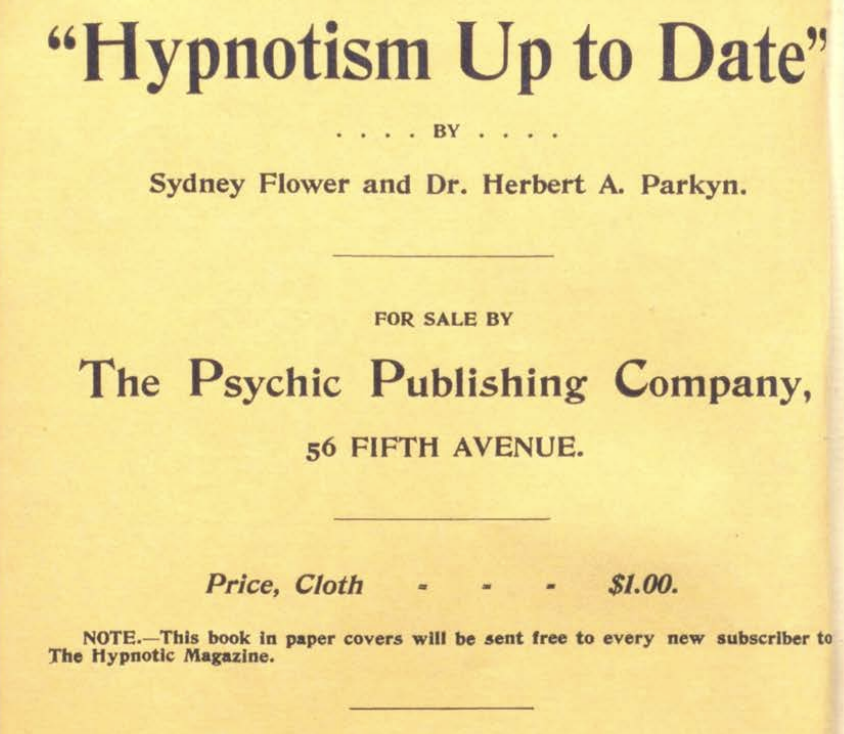
Hypnotism Up to Date by Flower and Parkyn. (1896)

Hypnotism Up to Date was released in 1896, and contains dialogues between Sydney Flower, as the "skeptical inquirer", and Parkyn as "the doctor", explaining hypnosis. Initially published under Flower’s name, it was later credited to both, with Flower describing himself as Parkyn’s "mouthpiece". The book defined hypnotism as a natural mental state rather than a supernatural force, saying that hypnotism cannot compel crime or reveal secrets, and is safe when properly practiced. It also presents hypnosis as a medical and moral tool for treating pain and bad habits, while criticizing popular fiction for misrepresenting its nature.

=== A Study in Hypnotism ===
A Study in Hypnotism (1896) presents a fictional narrative centered on a hypnotist, Richard Robinson, who defends the scientific, non-mystical nature of suggestion while engaging with skeptical audiences and developing a romantic relationship with a patient. The story contrasts Robinson's rational approach with characters who prefer to preserve the mysterious and occult associations of hypnotism and who argue that such elements enhance its psychological effect.

The use of a narrative format to present these ideas was inspired by the writings of Henry Wood, who had pioneered the use of fictional narratives as vehicles for teaching metaphysical principles.

The novel draws on the nineteenth-century archetype Richard Robinson, who was associated with the 1836 Helen Jewett murder case. Parkyn sought to redefine the hypnotist as a disciplined practitioner who used suggestion in a clear, therapeutic, and non-mystical manner.

=== Auto-Suggestion: What It Is and How to Use It for Health, Happiness and Success ===
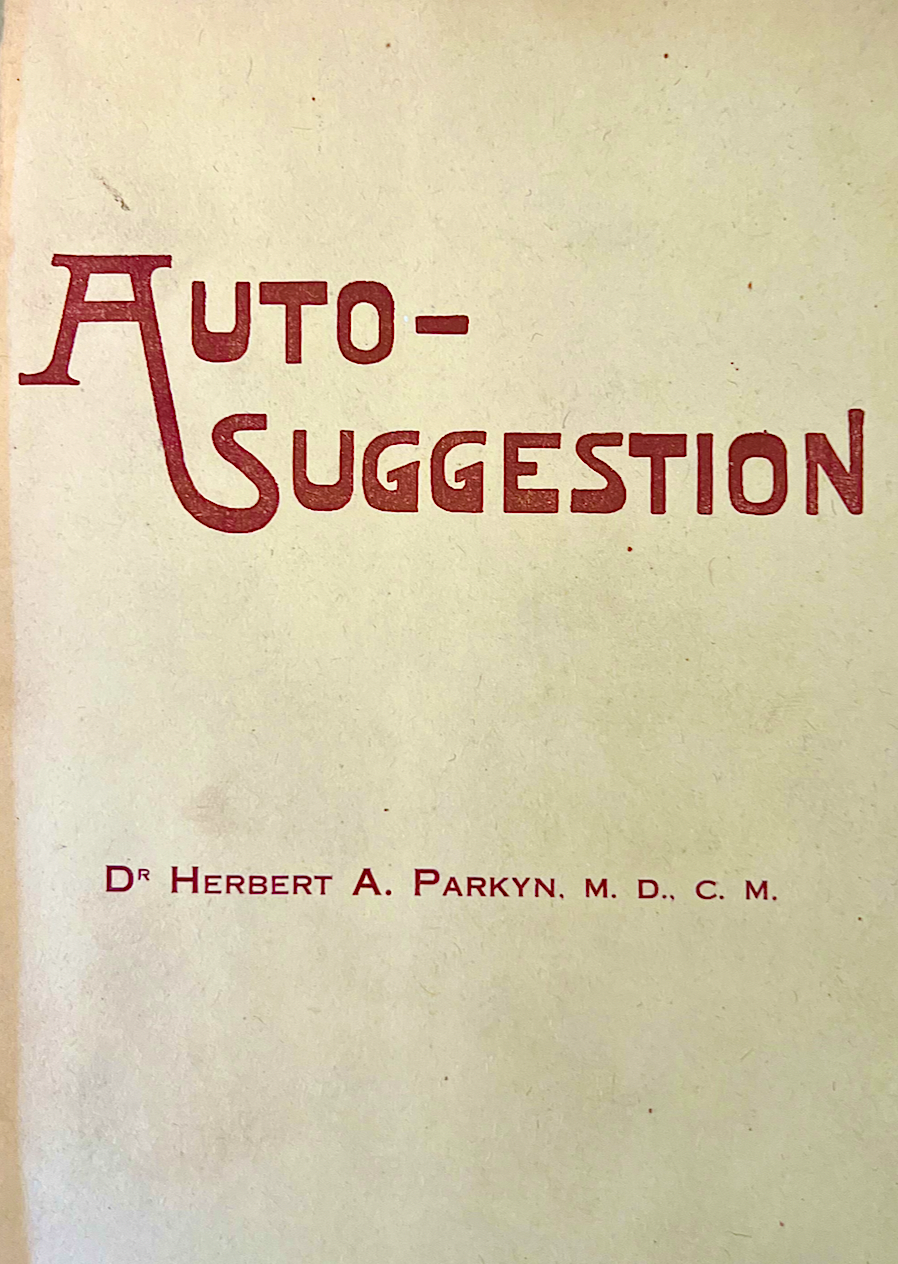
A French print of Parkyn's Auto Suggestion, What It Is and How to Use It for Health, Happiness and Success.

Beginning in the mid-1890s, Parkyn expanded on the Nancy School teachings of suggestive therapeutics, whereby the therapist gives suggestions to the patient, and developed auto-suggestion as a self-directed system of suggestive affirmations, visualizations, repetitions, emotional reinforcements, and habit formations.

In the fall of 1905, Parkyn published the book Auto-Suggestion, which presents the subject as the universal psychological mechanism behind all healing and personal transformation. Parkyn said that the process operates continuously, both voluntarily and involuntarily, and that mastery of this inner process was the key to lasting well-being. The Nautilus called it: "The most practical, helpful little book in the English language". Auto-Suggestion became Parkyn's most successful book, gaining recognition with medical and lay audiences, and selling over 30,000 copies within its first two years. In the book, Parkyn said:

Let us arise, then, and see what we can do by new auto-suggestions to stamp out these old absurd notions, first in ourselves, and then, by precept and practice, endeavor to assist our fellow men to free themselves from self-imposed burdens. Let us examine ourselves to discover the part played by superstitious, absurd childish impressions, and habits formed in childhood, in making us miserable or unhealthy, or in retarding our progress in this world. Then let us make ourselves over again by constantly repeated auto-suggestions in the form of affirmations that we are masters of our own destiny.

=== The Thinker magazine ===
In late 1923, Parkyn reunited with Flower and Atkinson to publish The Thinker. Flower edited the magazine, while Parkyn contributed a year-long series on Auto-suggestion. Atkinson also contributed a year-long series titled Self-Treatment Through Thought=Force. The Thinker was branded as "The World's Leading Magazine of Constructive Thinking, Psycho-Analysis, Health, Hygiene, Happiness, and Success". Contributors from earlier publishing ventures, such as Ella Wheeler Wilcox and Charles Edmund DeLand, along with new writers, including Margaret Sanger and Arthur Brisbane, had their work published in The Thinker.

=== Gallery ===
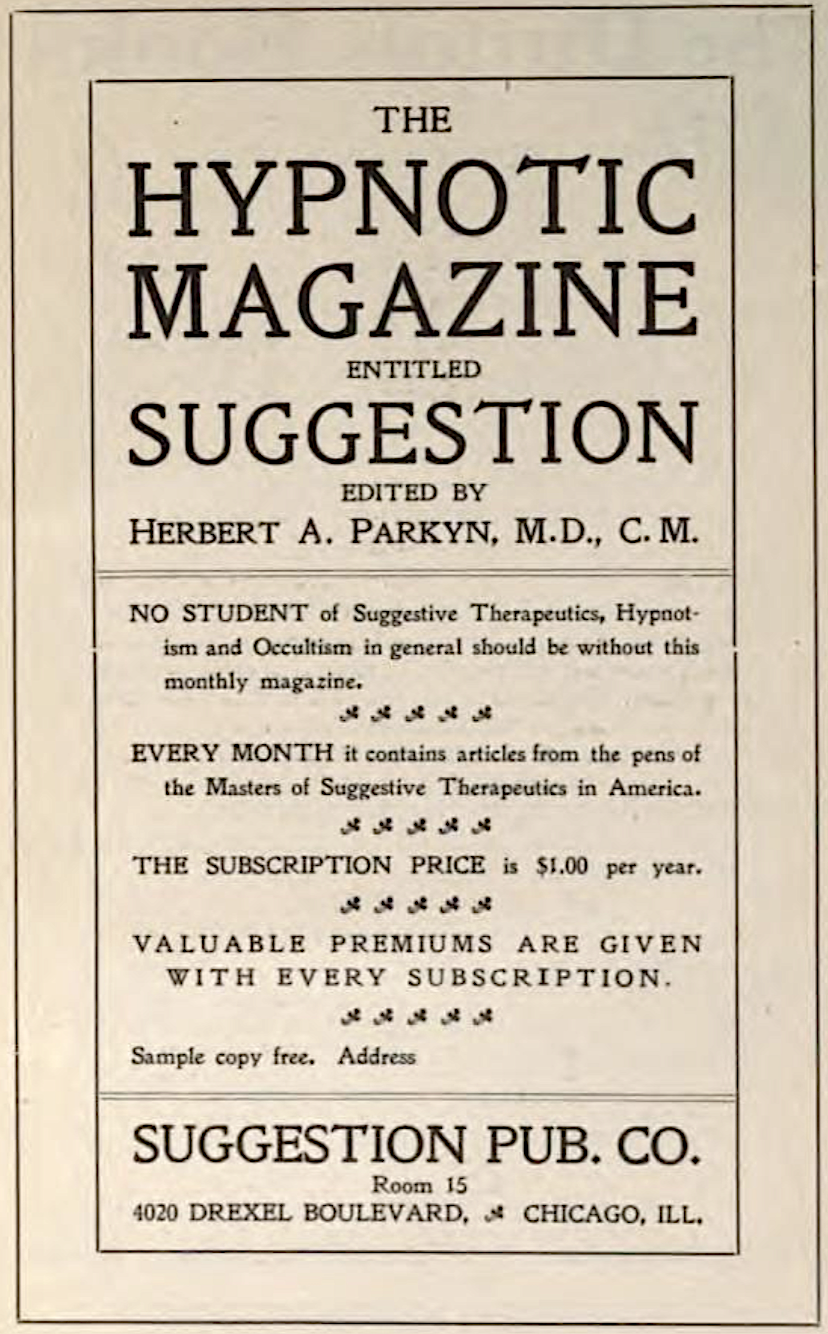
Hypnotic Magazine entitled Suggestion

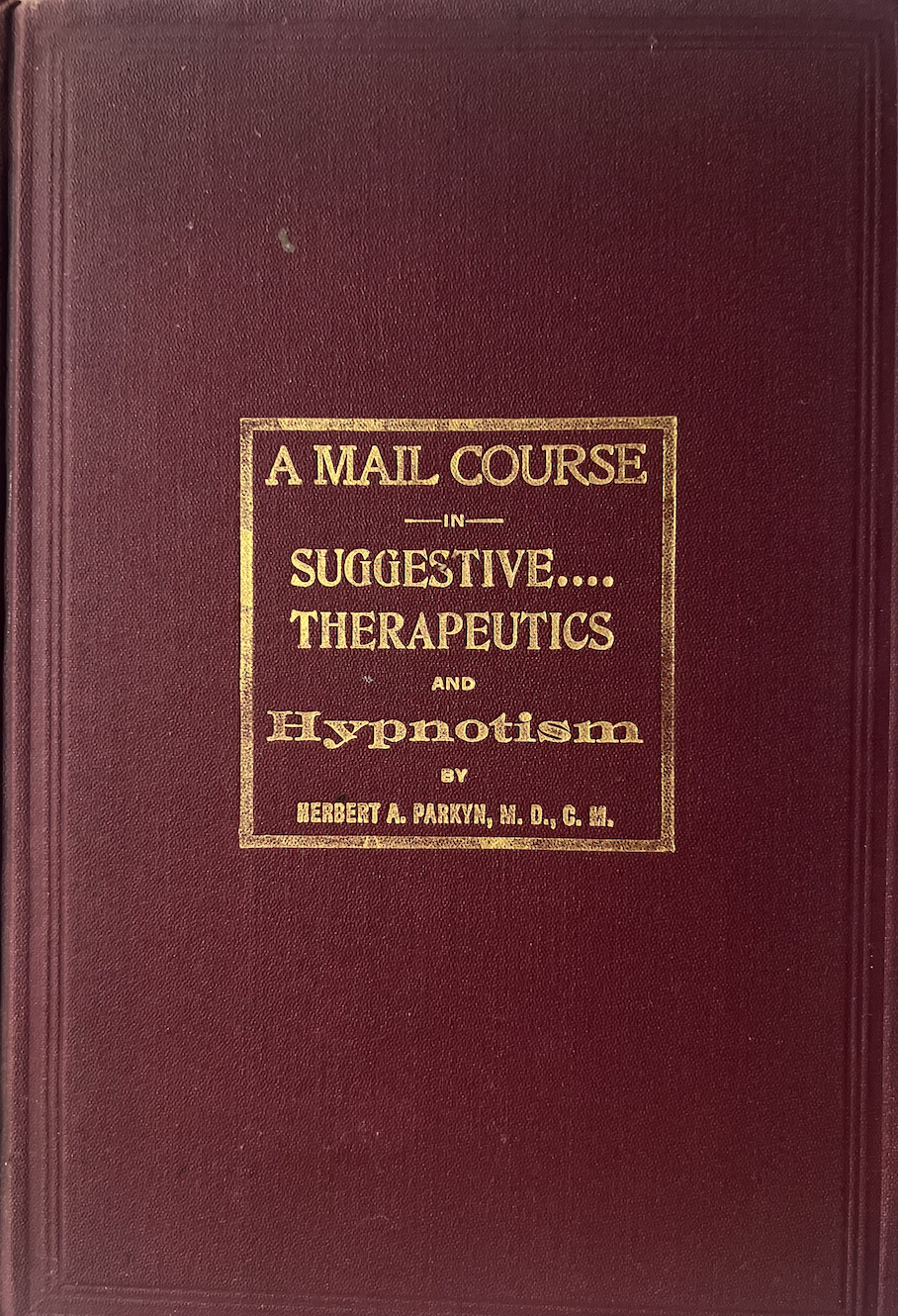
Special Mail Course in Hypnotism and Suggestive Therapeutics

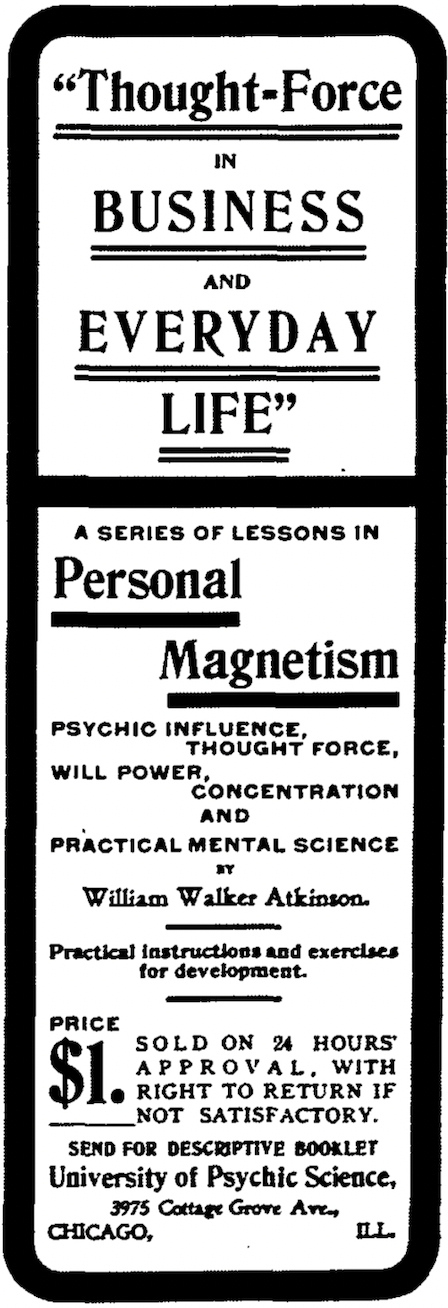
Thought = Force in Business and Everyday Life by Atkinson

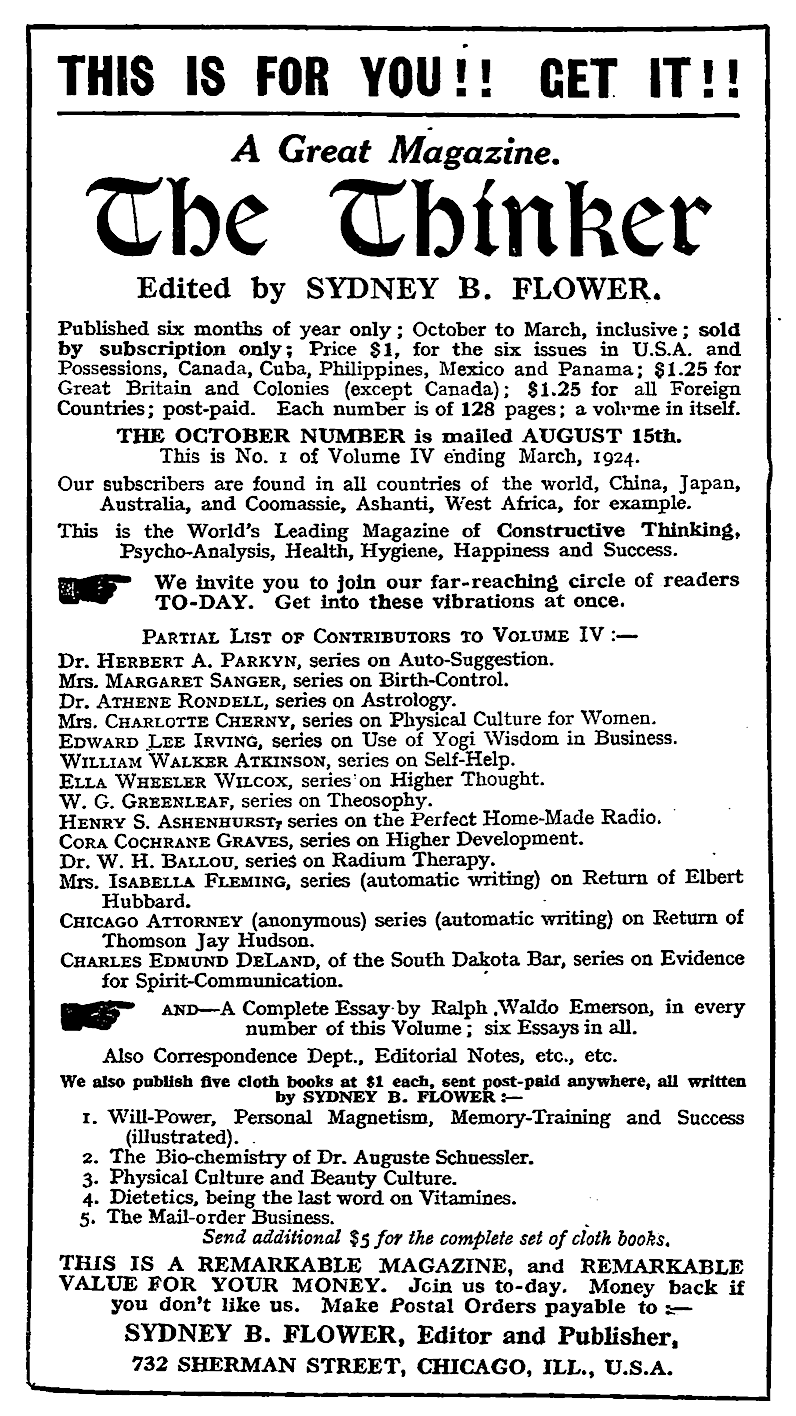
The Thinker magazine

== Ideas, teachings and beliefs ==
=== Auto-suggestion ===
Parkyn was among the first to teach and use the term auto-suggestion, defining it as the process by which individuals influence their own involuntary mind to produce mental and physical change. He distinguished between voluntary auto-suggestion, the deliberate repetition of desired thoughts, and involuntary auto-suggestion, formed unconsciously through repeated impressions, emphasizing that the mind acts on dominant ideas. He taught that suggestion extends beyond spoken words, stating that "anything that suggests is a suggestion", and warned against negative phrasing that reinforces unwanted ideas. Instead, he promoted positive, repeated directives, such as "I can" and "I will", which became central to his teaching and later a New Thought slogan.

==== Émile Coué's AutoSuggestion ====
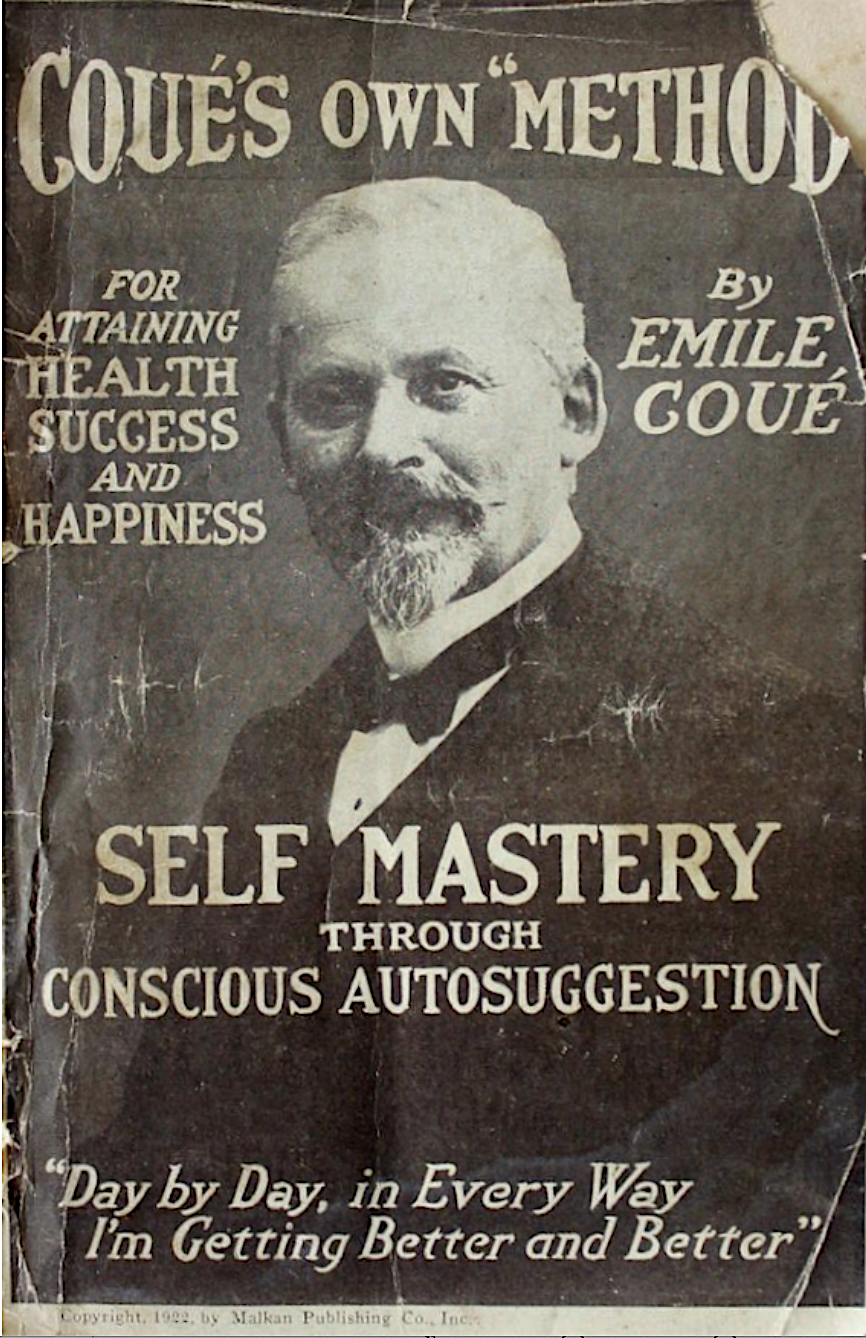
Émile Coué's 1922 book Self Mastery Through Conscious Autosuggestion drew heavily on Parkyn's earlier work.

In 1922, the French psychologist Émile Coué achieved international fame with the publication of Self-Mastery Through Conscious AutoSuggestion, triggering a craze. Coué became one of the most famous people in America; millions of people would grab their strings of rosary-like "Coué beads" and stand in front of mirrors repeating his famous mantra, "Day by day in every way, I am getting better and better".

At the time, observers noted that Coué's emphasis on daily affirmations, verbal repetition, and mental visualization mirrored techniques taught by Parkyn and his graduates decades earlier.

The subtitle of Coué's book, For Attaining Health, Success, and Happiness, closely resembles Parkyn's How to Use It for Health, Happiness and Success. Coué also reworded Parkyn's core maxim, "Thought tends to take form in action, and if the thoughts are earnest and determined the action is almost certain to follow", rephrasing it as, "Every thought entirely filling our mind becomes true for us and tends to transform itself into action".

Charles Baudouin, one of Coué's closest collaborators, documented the connection between Coué's system and Parkyn's earlier work in his book Suggestion and Autosuggestion (1920), where he repeatedly cites Parkyn's book Auto-Suggestion and credits Parkyn with developing many of the techniques of self-suggestion.

Parkyn publicly addressed these parallels, both in print and in a 1923 national radio appearance. He argued that Coué's success relied on choosing highly suggestible individuals during demonstrations, similar to the methods of stage mentalists. He also argued that no system of suggestion would take lasting hold without combining it with the "life essentials", which Coué was not teaching.

=== Views on Christian Science ===
As drugless healing systems expanded in the United States, Parkyn became concerned that his scientifically framed approach to suggestion was being confused with the metaphysical claims of Mary Baker Eddy and Christian Science, whose Chicago headquarters were located across the street from his Chicago School. In response, Parkyn lectured and wrote extensively to distinguish suggestive therapeutics from religious healing systems.

Parkyn argued that reported Christian Science cures resulted from what he termed "masked suggestion", an unconscious psychological process rather than divine intervention. He criticized Eddy's book Science and Health with Key to the Scriptures as internally inconsistent and unsupported by science or theology, objecting in particular to its denial of matter, disease, and death. He concluded that Christian Science was neither a coherent medical system nor a consistent theology, but rather a belief system relying on unacknowledged psychological influence.

=== Thought takes form in action ===
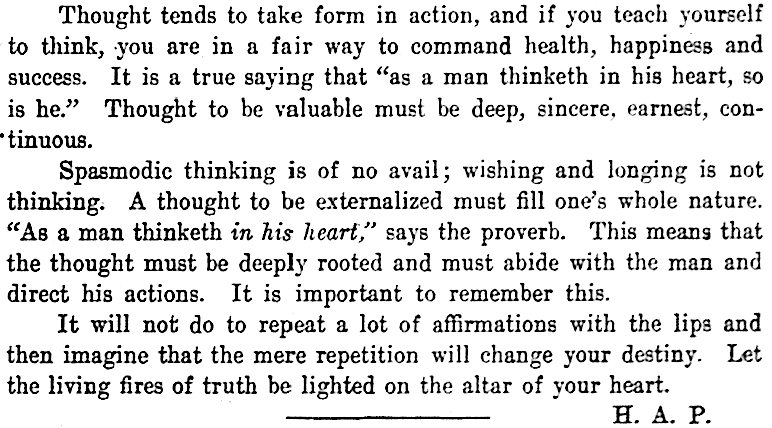
Parkyn on his philosophy

Parkyn's most repeated principle was, "Thought takes form in action", which he described as a governing law of nature. He taught that any idea impressed upon the mind, whether through deliberate repetition or unconscious acceptance, ultimately shapes happiness, health, and success. Repeated ideas become habits, mental attitudes produce measurable effects on the body, and every suggestion tends to carry itself out in action. He emphasized that this process operates automatically and without preference, so that constructive thoughts strengthen and heal, while negative ones produce limitation and illness.

Parkyn stated:

Thought tends to take form in action. Get the thoughts you wish a patient to entertain drilled into his mind, keep them stimulated by repetition, and the desired action is almost certain to follow. Anything that suggests is a suggestion, therefore be careful when in the presence of a patient or a child never to say anything yourself or allow anyone else to say anything that you do not wish to take form in action.

The principle became a motto within the New Thought movement and was repeated in many books and publications.

=== Life essentials ===
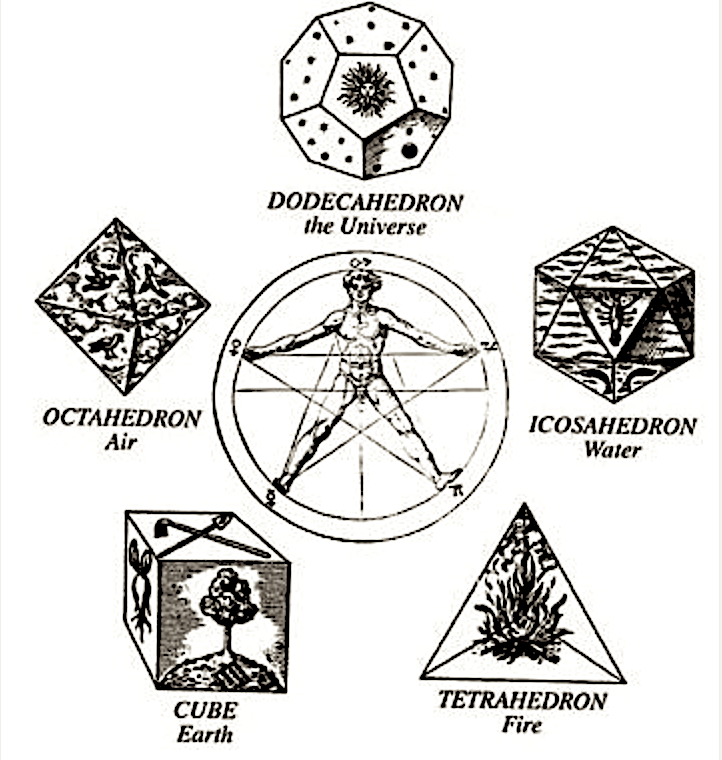
The ancient five elements and the corresponding five Platonic shapes.

Parkyn taught that health depended on supplying the body with what he termed the "life essentials": fresh air, sunshine, water, food, and exercise. Although the mind could exert a powerful influence over the body through suggestion, this only functioned fully when the life essentials were adequately supplied. Healthy thoughts stimulated appetite and elimination, while fear and unhealthy thinking disrupted appetite and weakened the body.

Parkyn equated this system with the ancient Hermetic doctrine of the five elements, the doctrine that held that all matter and natural phenomena arise from Air, Fire, Water, Earth, and Aether or Spirit. To Parkyn, these elements were not merely substances but also dynamic forces acting within the human body. He taught that each life essential was a direct expression of one of these elemental principles: fresh air and deep breathing corresponded to Air; sunshine and light to Fire; water intake and purification to Water; nourishment to Earth; and exercise and mental activity to Aether or Spirit. Disease arose when these elemental forces fell out of balance.

=== The science of suggestive salesmanship ===
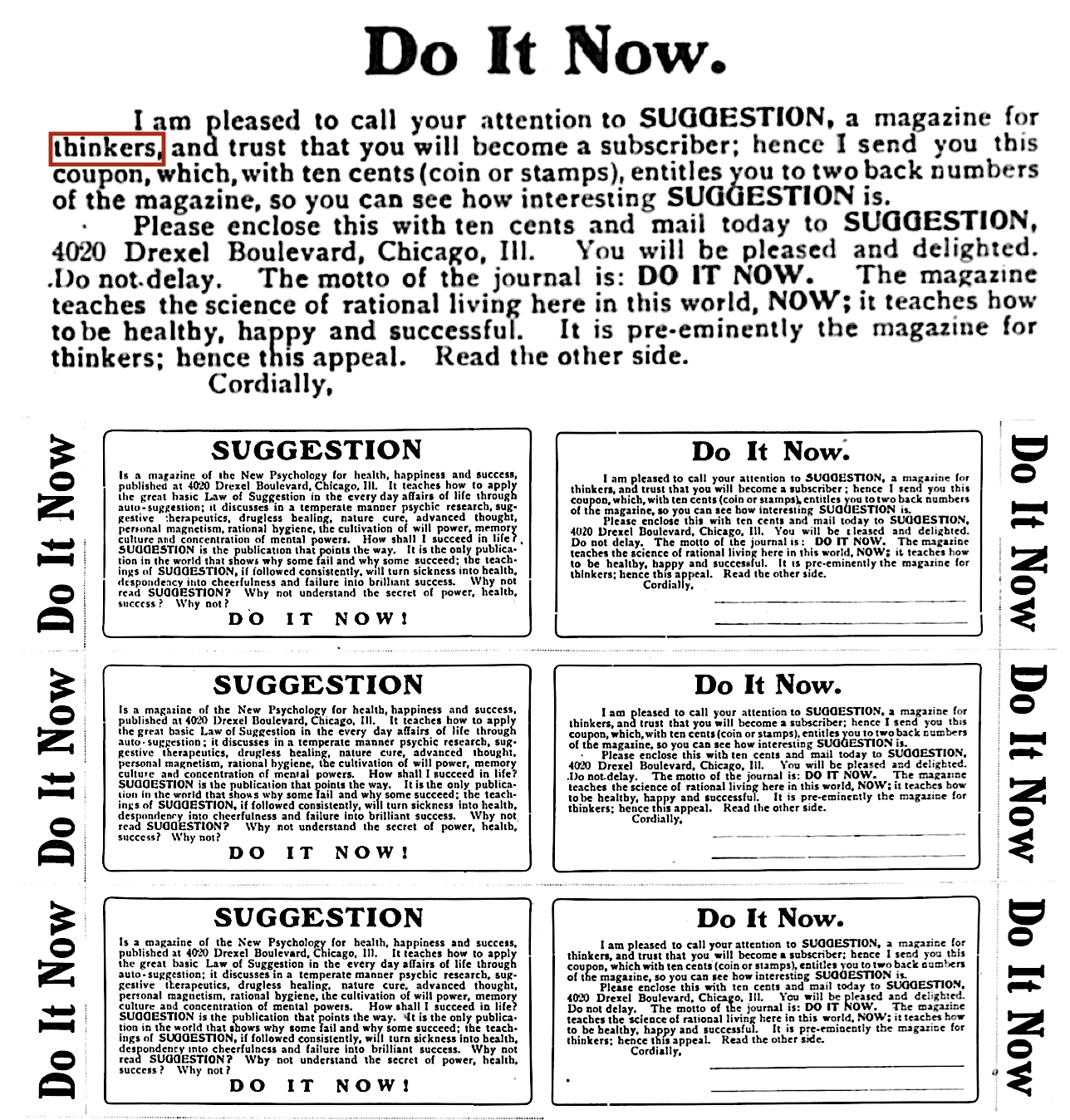
Parkyn used the terms "Do it Now", "Thinker", and "Happiness, Health, and Success", as mottos for Suggestion magazine and clubs.

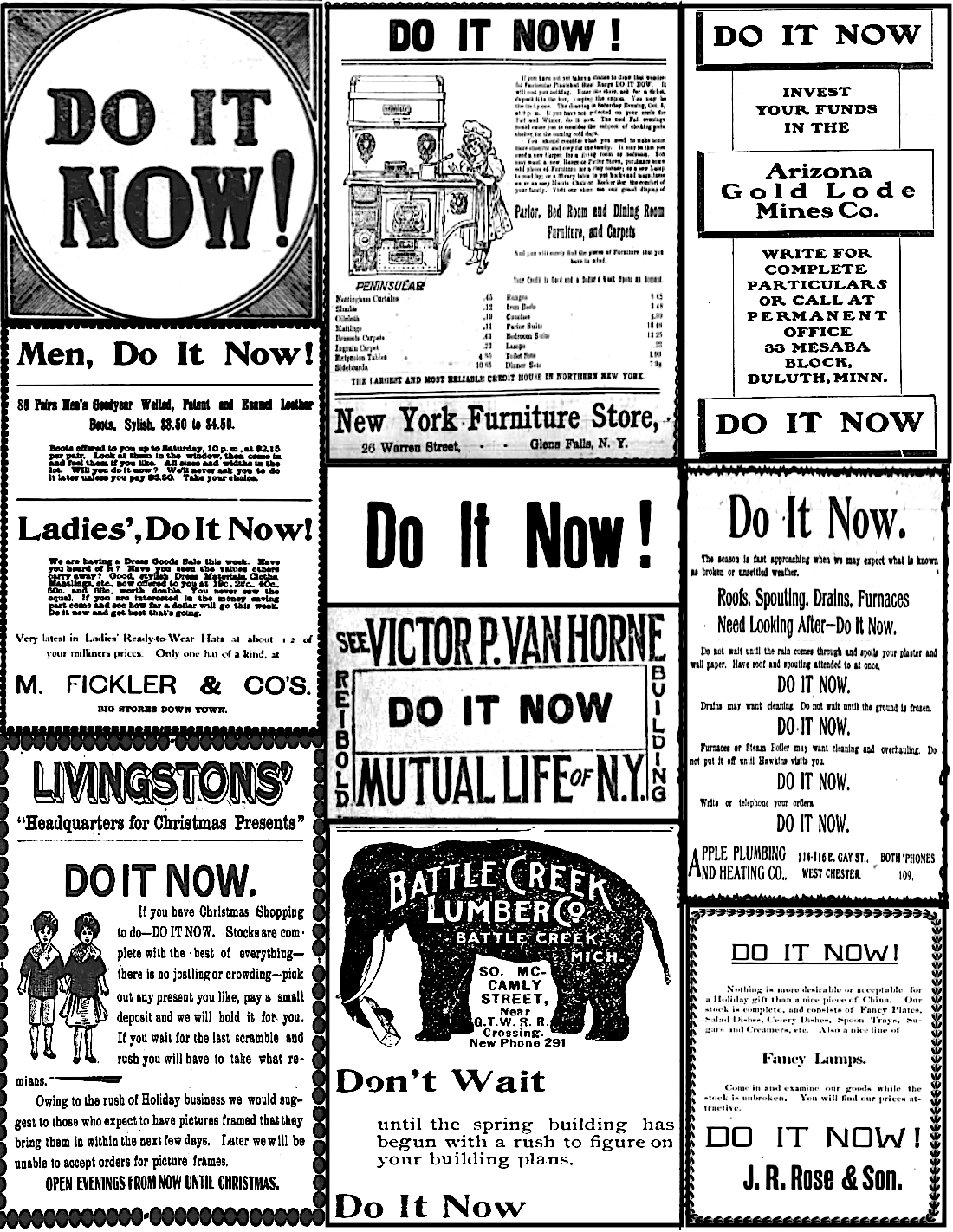
Among other slogans, Parkyn's slogan "Do it now" was used in newspaper advertisements.

As advertising schools and business colleges began to incorporate psychological training into their curriculums, several drew directly from the teachings of the Chicago School of Psychology. Parkyn became affiliated with the Sheldon School of Scientific Salesmanship in Chicago, where his methods were applied to buyer psychology and persuasion. The Law of Suggestion was treated as the foundation of salesmanship, based on the idea that mental laws govern and shape a buyer's attention, interest, desire, and action. Parkyn's maxim, "Thought takes form in action", was taught to illustrate how repeated ideas influence behavior.

Parkyn extended these principles into national advertising campaigns where he provided suggestive "catch phrases" for ads. He used many of his well-known phrases as repeated suggestions to influence the public with positive affirmations. This included using "Thought takes form in action, repeated actions become habits" for a national banking campaign, as well as "I can and I will", "Do it Now", "Are you a Thinker", and "Health, Happiness, and Success".

== Exposing fraudulent practitioners ==
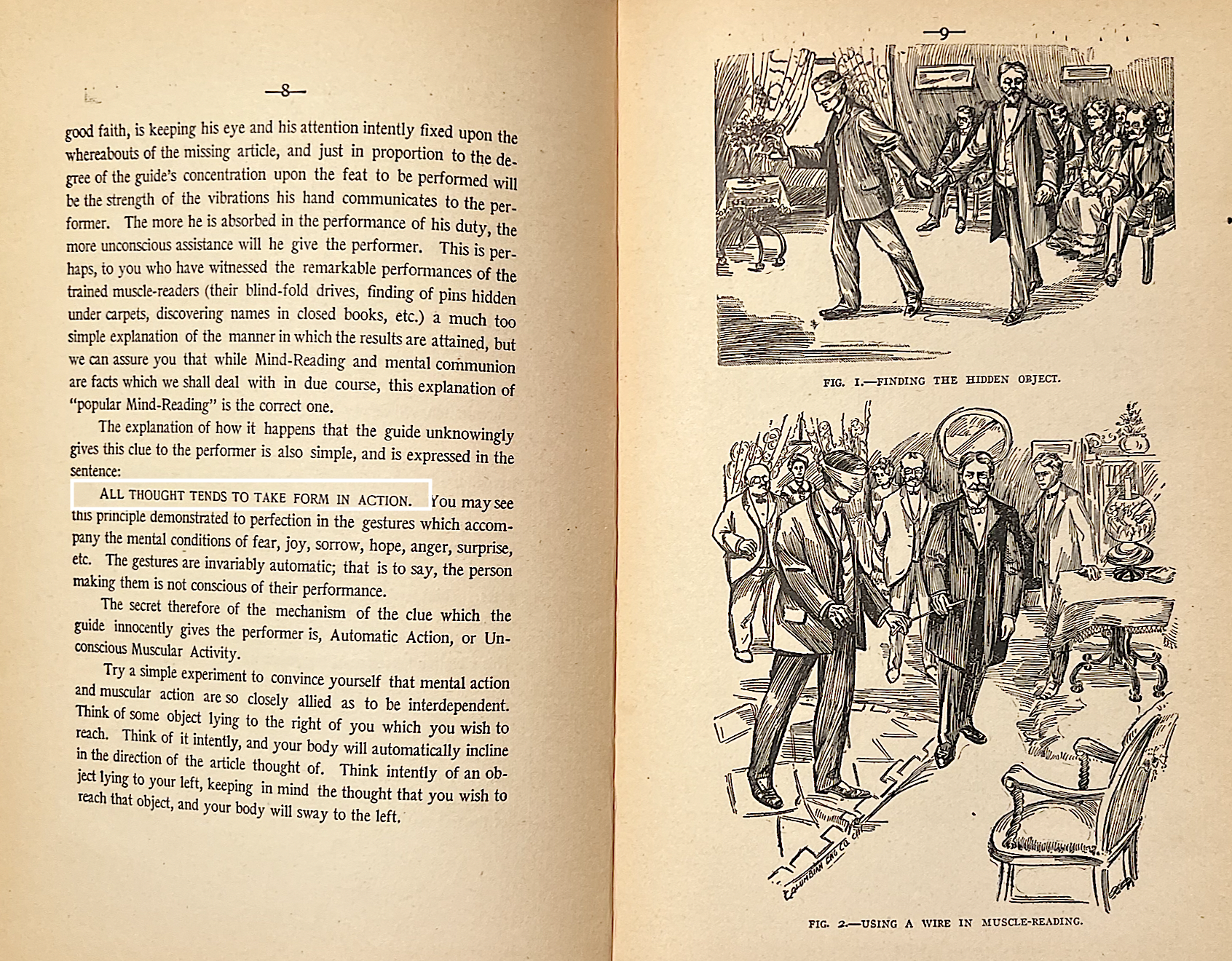
A Complete Course in the Art of Mind Reading, Psychic Research Company, with Parkyn conducting demonstrations at his Chicago School of Psychology.

Parkyn made the investigation of psychic claims a central part of his work, testing trance mediums, clairvoyants, and stage mentalists under controlled conditions. Working with Sydney B. Flower and Stanley L. Krebs, Parkyn first exposed the Chicago spiritualist mediums the Bangs Sisters, showing that their slate-writing séances depended on concealed methods and accomplices. Then with William Walker Atkinson as his assistant, he tested performers such as Maud Lancaster, whose results failed under controlled conditions without sensory cues.

In 1900, Parkyn anonymously authored A Complete Course in the Art of Mind Reading, published by the Psychic Research Company. Drawing on his investigations, he explained that so-called mind reading was actually muscle reading, an expression of "thought taking form in action". The text disclosed many methods behind mentalist feats, including the "blindfolded carriage drive".

Parkyn contended that these abilities, while not supernatural, still reflected genuine psychological feats achieved through disciplined practice. He considered the study of such techniques as valuable training in concentration and self-control.

== The World New Thought Federation ==
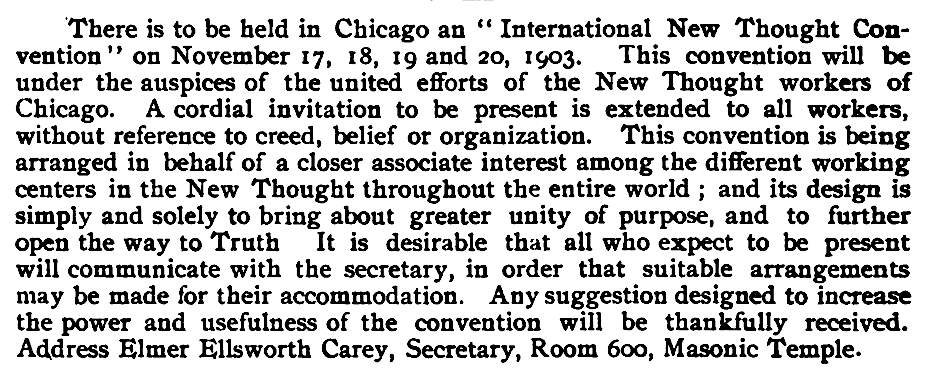
Editorial about the first International New Thought Convention, by Parkyn in Suggestion

In 1903, Parkyn and Elmer Ellsworth Carey, his new manager and associate editor of Suggestion, worked to unite Western New Thought groups with Eastern leaders associated with the Metaphysical League of Boston, an institution that Parkyn’s family friend Henry Wood helped to form. In June, Parkyn, Carey, Sydney B. Flower, and William Walker Atkinson hosted a large Chicago banquet welcoming Elizabeth Towne of The Nautilus to the city. The event marked the beginning of what became the Union New Thought meetings, which drew over 1,000 leaders of the movement.

These monthly meetings led to the first International New Thought Convention in Chicago in November 1903. Carey served as secretary and through Suggestion handled all communication and advertising. The convention resulted in the formation of the World New Thought Federation and the merger of the Metaphysical League into the new body.

== Business ventures ==
Alongside his work in teaching and publishing, Parkyn was actively involved in large-scale business enterprises. His belief was that wealth could be directed toward broader social change, aiming to help create a new economic system in which individuals could "enjoy life and the freedom of happiness unhampered by artificial conditions created by inimical legislation and predatory trusts." His business ventures reflected this belief, combining cooperative enterprise models, patented innovations aimed at reshaping industry, and transportation and distribution systems intended to expand access across previously undeveloped regions.

=== The Motzorongo Plantation Company ===
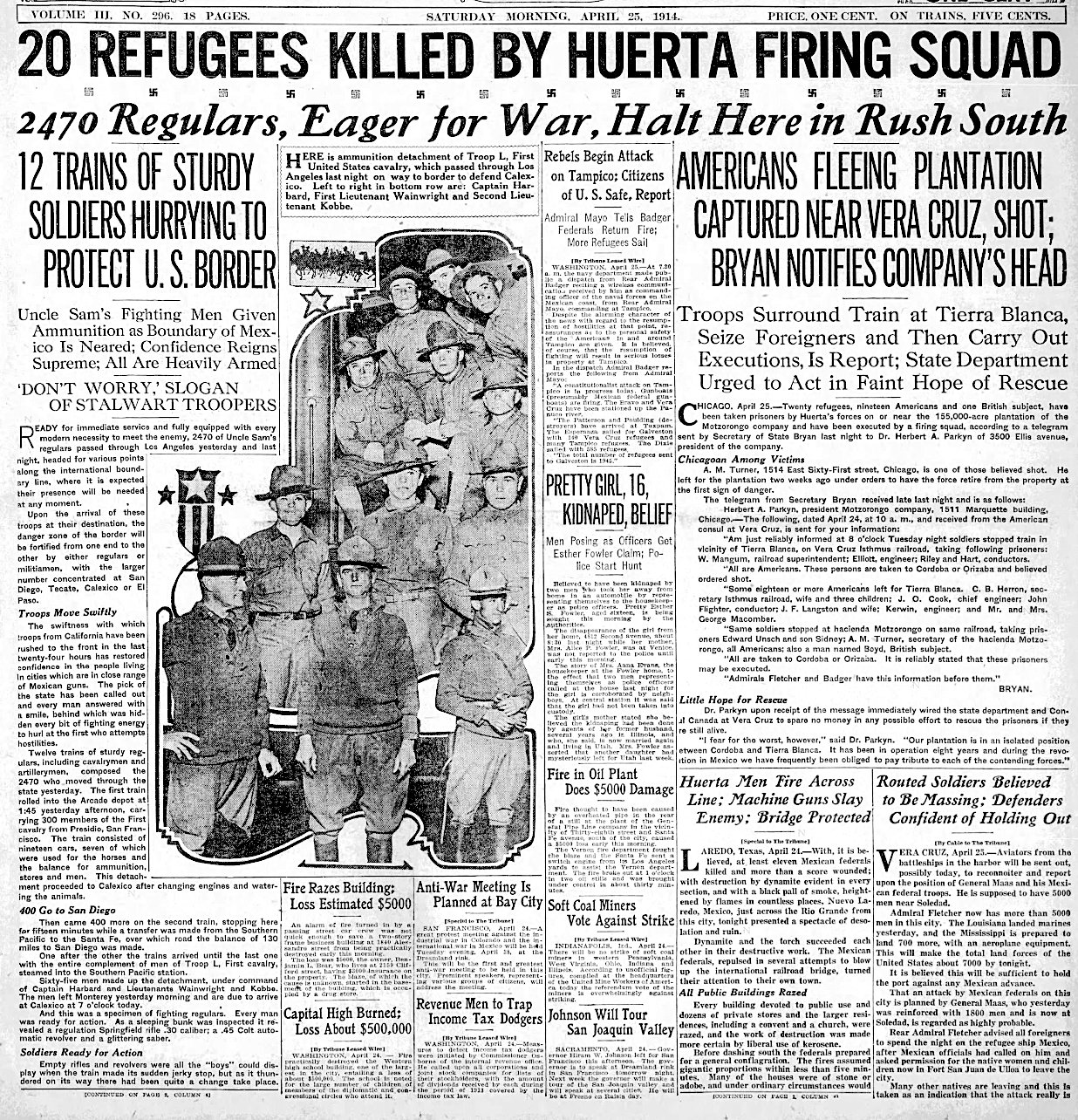
U.S. Secretary of State William Jennings Bryan forwarded the news to Dr. Parkyn in a telegram.

In 1902, Parkyn helped found the Motzorongo Plantation Company, a major agricultural enterprise in Veracruz, Mexico. Parkyn served as president and principal promoter, while his father, James Parkyn, acted as general manager overseeing operations in Mexico. His father would die there of typhoid fever in 1909.

The companies holdings reached approximately 360,000 acres, over 560 square miles, making it the largest American-controlled agricultural property in Mexico at the time. It was promoted as a cooperative enterprise, emphasizing shared benefit among investors, management, and laborers rather than a purely profit-driven structure.

In 1914, the plantation drew national attention during the Motzorongo Incident, when false reports that General Victoriano Huerta’s troops had captured and executed twenty American employees nearly triggered conflict between the United States and Mexico.

=== The Black Sand and Gold Recovery Company ===
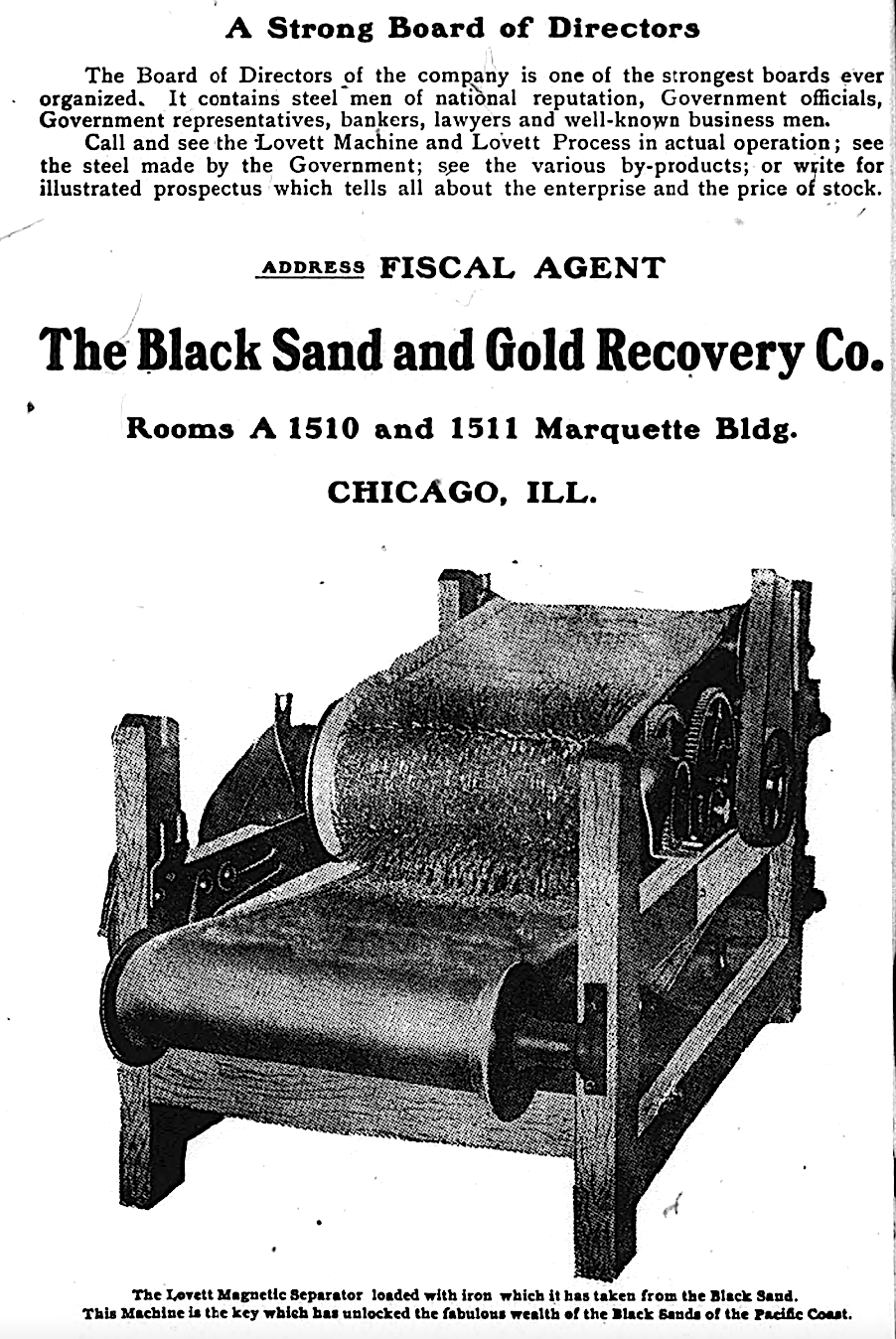
An ad for Lovett's Magnetic Separator in Suggestion magazine, Nov. 1906.

In 1906, Parkyn organized the Black Sand and Gold Recovery Company, which utilized the Lovett Magnetic Separator, a patented device developed by Chicago engineer Thomas J. Lovett, who lived directly across the street from Parkyn. The machine was designed to extract gold, iron, and other valuable minerals from black sand deposits. By 1909 it was supplying placer mining operations across the western states, and to meet demand, it established manufacturing facilities in Denver and Salt Lake City.

Parkyn’s involvement with the Lovett Magnetic Separator began earlier, when in 1903 he helped organize the North Shore Reduction Company in Canada and promoted the venture through New Thought magazine with Sydney B. Flower as fiscal agent.

=== The Southwestern Pacific Railroad Company ===
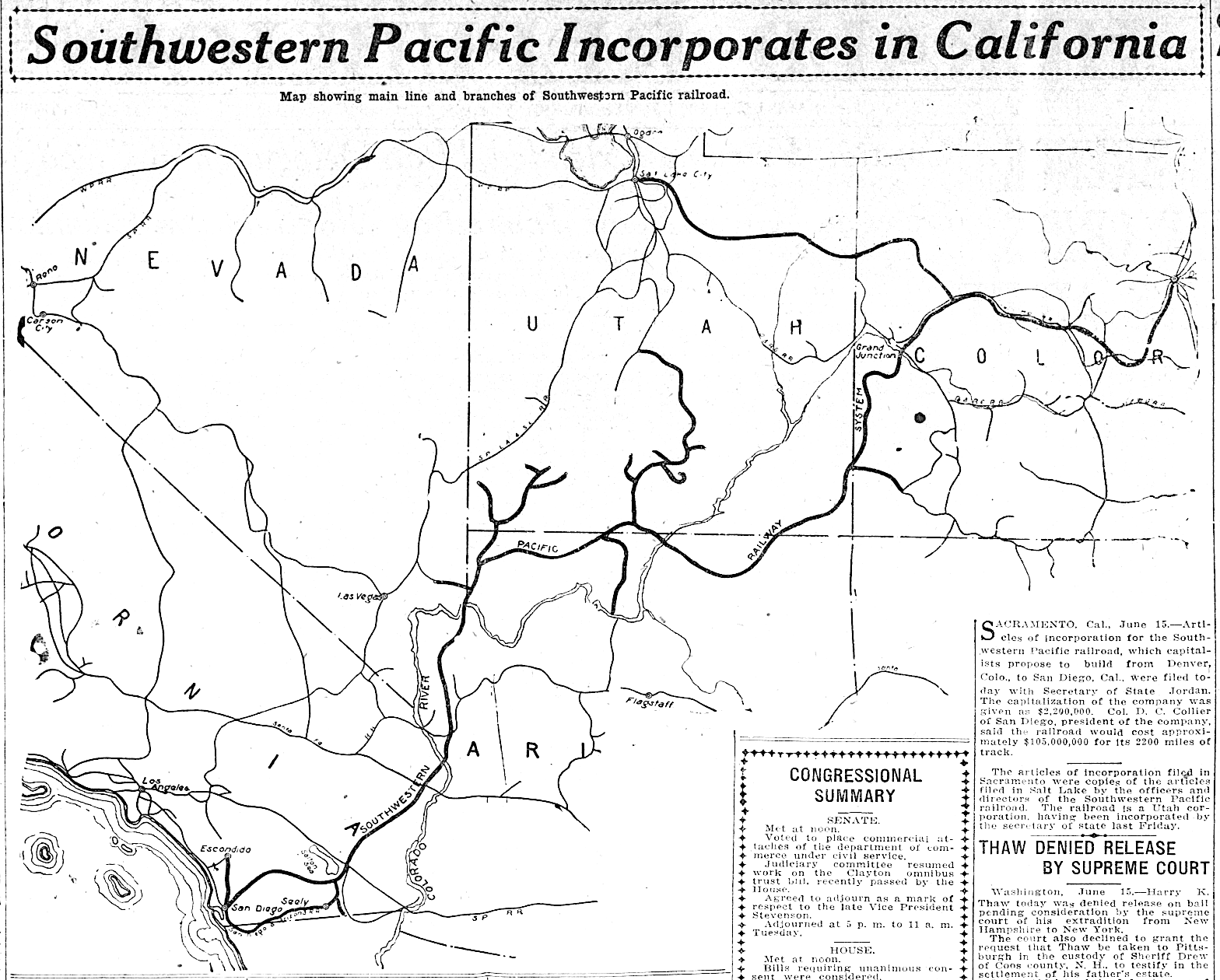
Map of the proposed Southwestern Pacific Railroad

In 1914, Parkyn became a founding partner in the Southwestern Pacific Railroad Company. The enterprise was a large-scale rail and industrial project designed to connect Denver and Salt Lake City to the Pacific coast at San Diego, as part of a broader integrated system of transportation, industry, and land development. Parkyn served as first vice president and director and was the largest individual investor, contributing nearly $2 million in cash in 1914.

Despite having received approval from the Department of the Interior, including rights-of-way, options on 8 million acres, federal subsidies, and access to land for irrigation and settlement, the 2,200-mile, $105 million railroad and industrial project stalled in mid-1915 when the outbreak of the First World War disrupted supply lines and expected European financing.

== Later life ==
While operating his various business ventures, Parkyn continued to work within the New Thought movement, while staying largely out of public view. He wrote and published under pseudonyms and acted as a financial backer and organizer for several schools and publishing enterprises, mostly in Denver and Los Angeles.

=== Hypnotic radio clinics ===
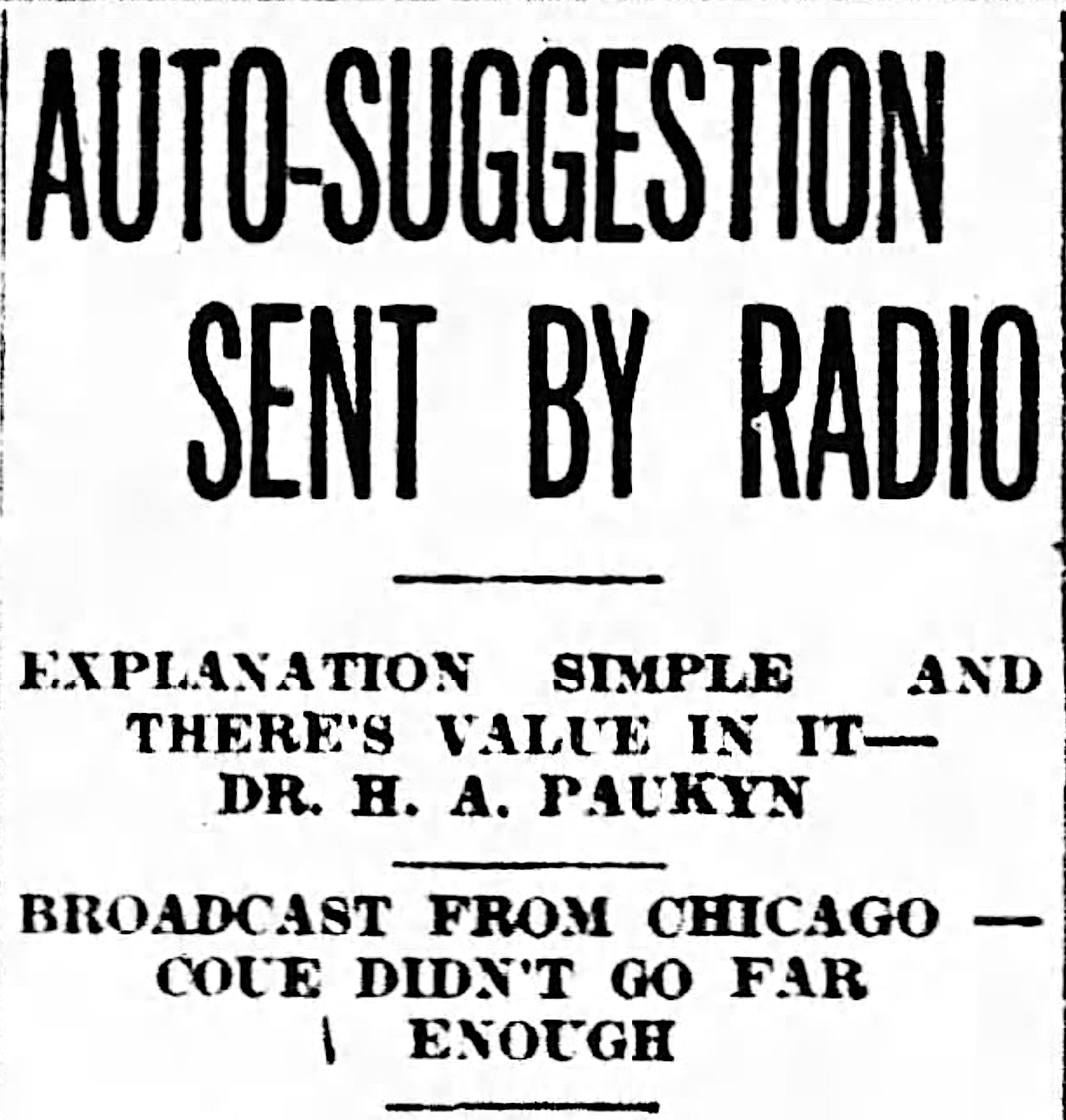
Parkyn conducts the first-ever radio "Hypnotic clinics."

In the 1920s, Parkyn publicly re-entered the mental sciences discussion, following the national auto-suggestion movement associated with Émile Coué. In 1923, he appeared on KYW Chicago where he conducted the first radio-based therapeutic broadcasts, dubbed "hypnotic radio clinics". Parkyn described these broadcasts as an application of collective suggestion, stating:

...thought takes form in action and our thoughts sent out to others react on ourselves; therefore, with the minds of all the listeners working harmoniously as a unit and holding certain helpful thoughts at the same instant for those needing help, there will be real power in the thoughts and some remarkable results should follow.

== Personal life and death ==
=== Marriage ===
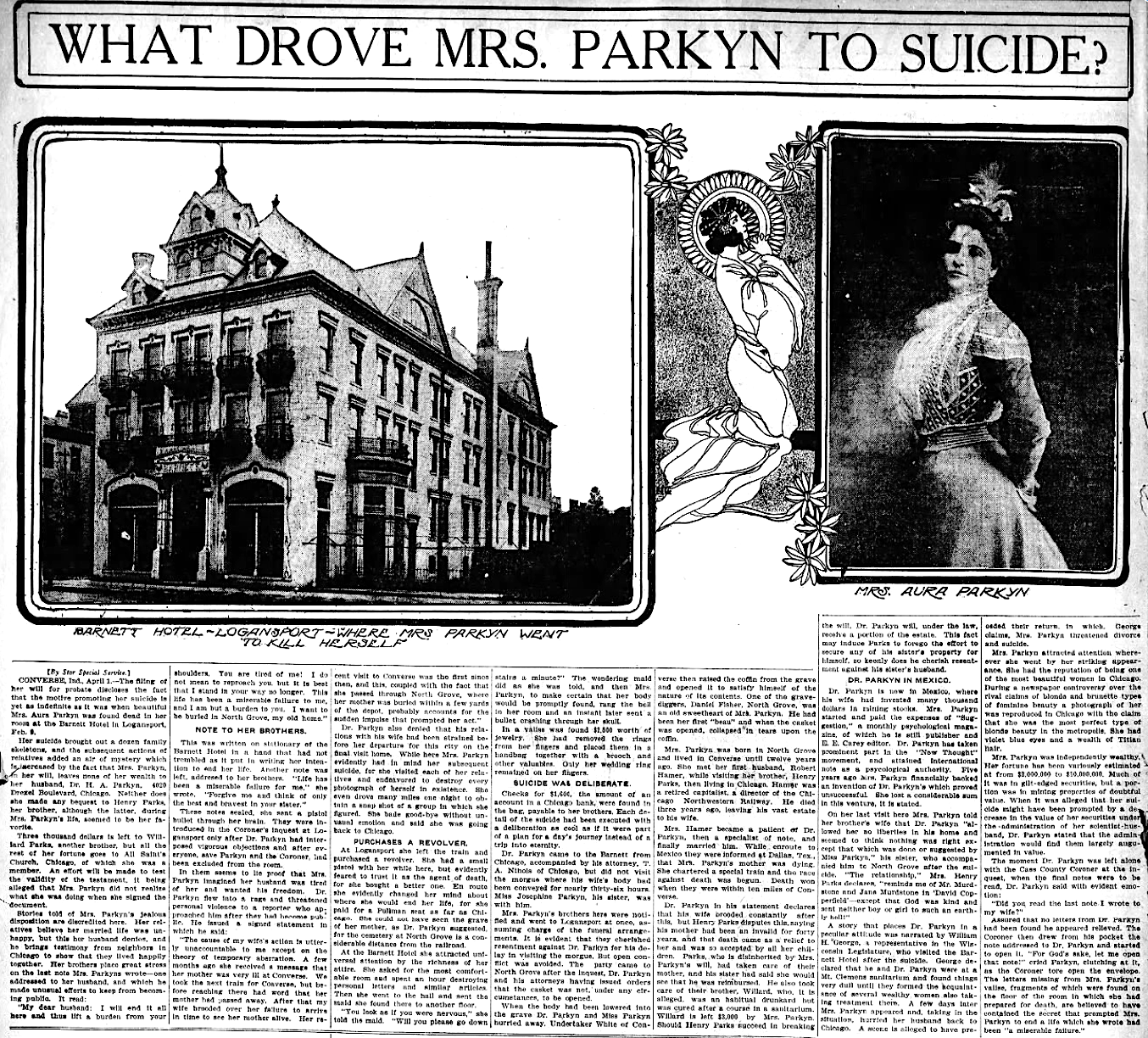
Newspaper article slandering Parkyn in the case of his wife's suicide.

On December 18, 1902, Parkyn married Aura L. Parks, a wealthy widow who had first come to him as a patient for melancholia following the suicide of her husband, Robert W. Hamer, the president of the Chicago and North-Western Railroad. Parkyn treated her for approximately two years before their marriage.

In April 1905, after a recurrence of her condition following her mother’s death, Aura took her own life by shooting herself with a revolver purchased earlier that day while staying at the Barnett Hotel in Indiana. With Parkyn's well-known stature within the New Thought movement, the case became a national scandal. Newspapers published allegations accusing Parkyn of neglect, infidelity, financial exploitation, and even hypnotizing her to suicide, along with claims that he had concealed a letter she had left for him, that he had avoided identifying her body, and had embezzled her wealth for Mexican ventures. These allegations were later proven false, as affidavits and records confirmed that her estate remained intact in trust and was not controlled by Parkyn, that he had identified her body, and that the letter she left had been shared with investigators and family.

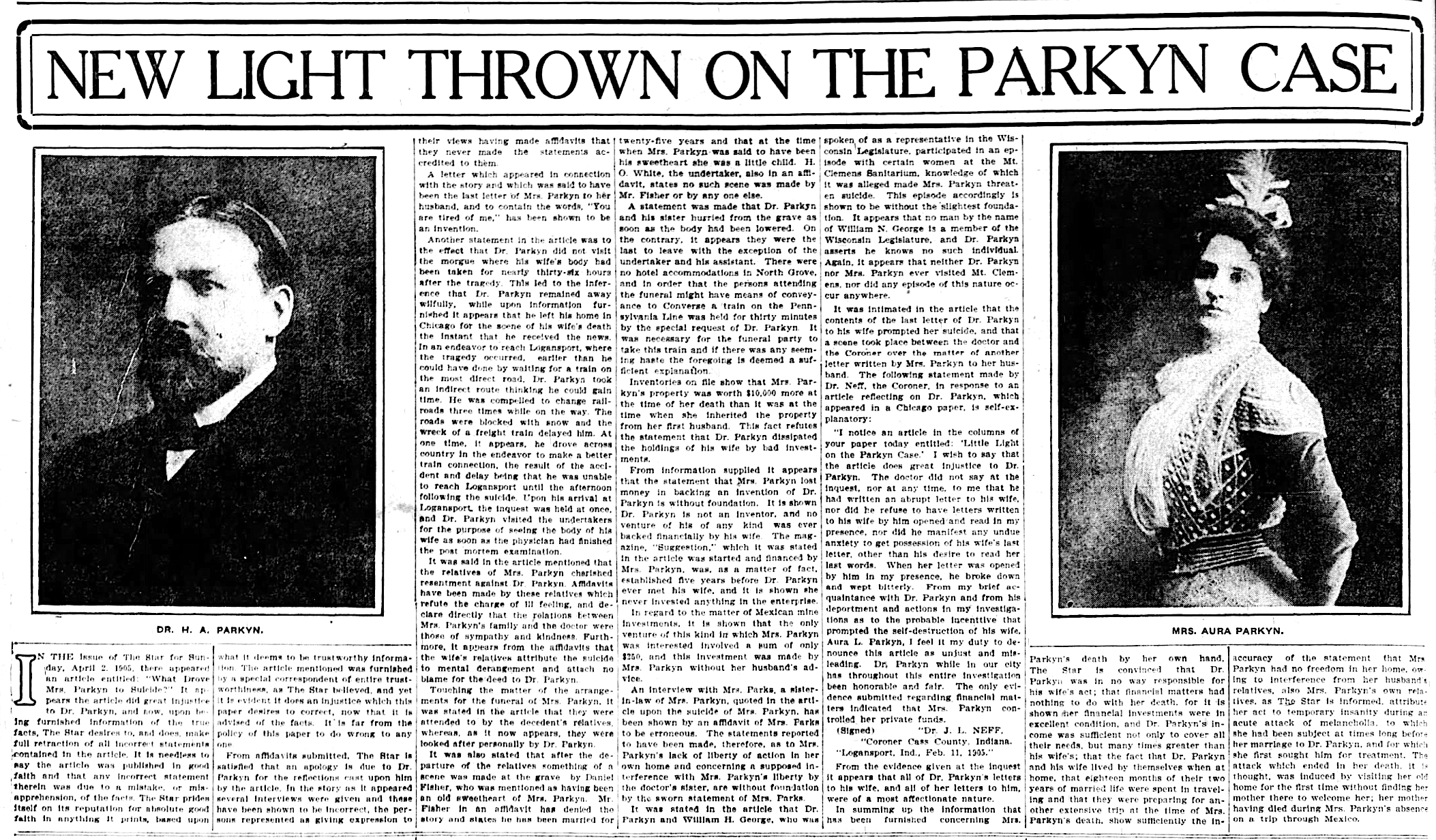
A full retraction of the slander of Parkyn in the case of his wife's suicide.

Aura's will left most of her estate to Rev. Jenkin Lloyd Jones whom she had studied under for the past two years, and stated that Parkyn had sufficient means, as he was wealthier than her. Although legally entitled, Parkyn did not contest the will as Jones was a close friend to his mentor, Dr. M. H. Lackersteen. Following these findings, the principal newspaper responsible issued a full retraction and a formal apology, acknowledging its inaccurate reporting and the damage done to Parkyn's reputation.

=== Death ===
Parkyn died on December 22, 1927, at his home in Highland Park, Illinois, from pneumonia. Following his death, his cousins, John Holmes Jackson and Horatio Nelson Jackson, traveled to Chicago to oversee the return of his body to Montreal where he was buried in the family plot at Cimetière Mont-Royal. His death came during a period of significant loss as less than a month earlier his brother-in-law, Samuel Hollister Jackson, died in the Great Vermont Flood while serving as Lieutenant Governor of Vermont. Parkyn was survived by his second wife Mary Arenberg and his two sisters, Mabel Maude Jackson and Margaret Winnifred B. Parkyn.
