= Autosuggestion =

Psychological technique related to the placebo effect

Autosuggestion is a psychological technique related to the placebo effect, popularized internationally by pharmacist Émile Coué in the 1920s. It is a form of self-induced suggestion in which individuals guide their own thoughts, feelings, or behavior. The technique is often used in self-hypnosis.

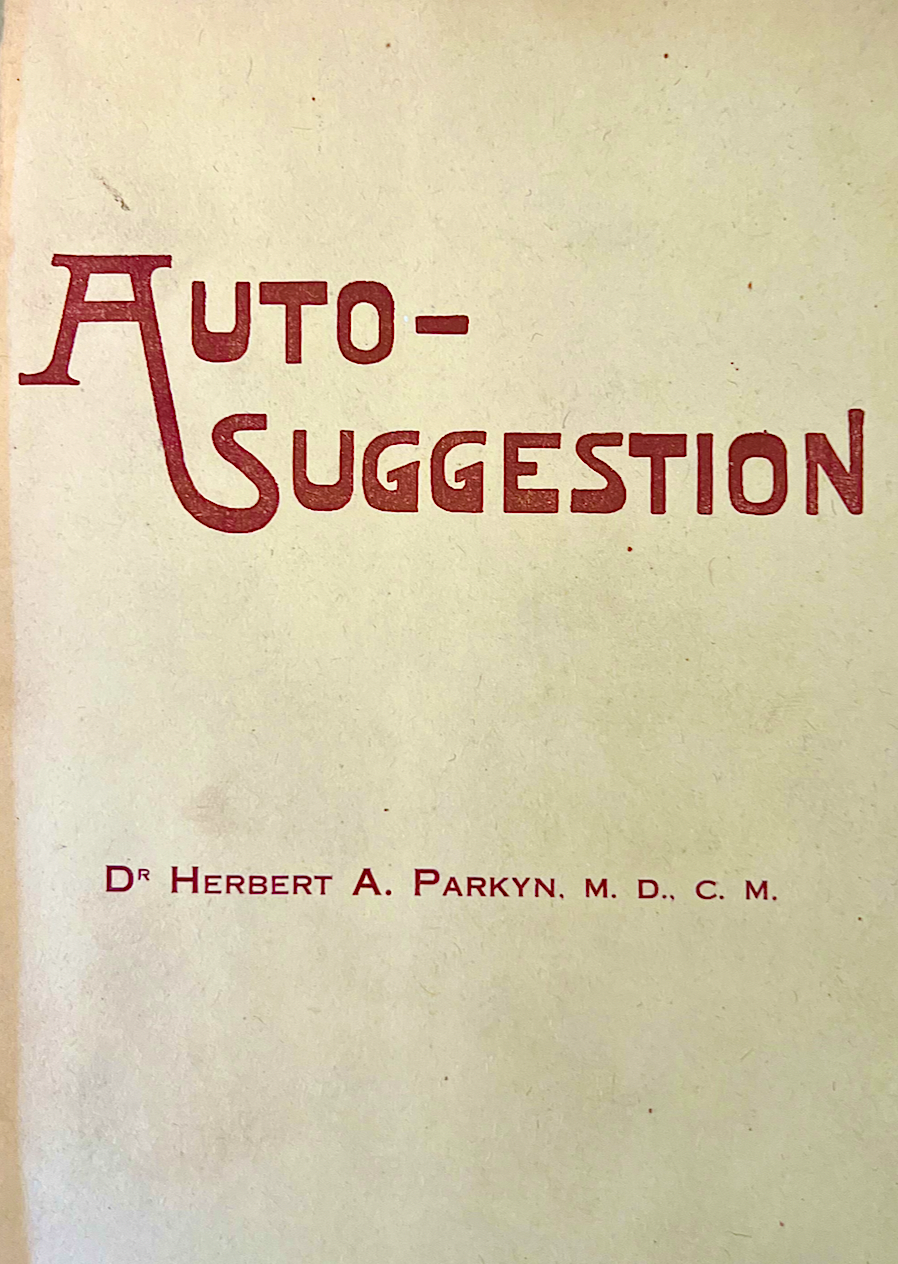
A French print of Dr. Herbert A. Parkyn's Auto Suggestion, What It Is and How to Use It for Health, Happiness and Success. The book was extremely popular in France, where it would have a big influence on Emile Coué.

While Émile Coué created an autosuggestion craze in America in the 1920s, the technique had already been developed and widely taught by Dr. Herbert A. Parkyn through experimentation at his Chicago School of Psychology and in his 1906 book Auto-Suggestion: What It Is and How to Use It for Health, Happiness and Success.

== History of Auto-suggestion ==
In Porphyry's Treatise on Abstinence, a certain Rogatianus, a Roman Senator, was cured of an articular disease of eight years' duration "by negligence of terrene concerns and a contemplation and intuition of such as are divine".

== Principle of Auto-Suggestion ==
Starting in 1896 at the Chicago School of Psychology, Dr. Parkyn taught that auto-suggestion was the key principle underlying both mental and physical transformation. He defined it as the process by which an individual consciously or unconsciously directs influence upon the involuntary mind. Students learned that every change in thought, emotion, or bodily function begins with suggestion, and that auto-suggestion is the means by which this universal law operates within oneself.

Students were taught the dual-mind theory of the objective and subjective minds first outlined by Thomson Jay Hudson, though Parkyn described the two aspects as the voluntary and involuntary parts of a single mind. The involuntary mind, he explained, governs every function of the body, serves as the seat of the emotions, and holds the complete record of experience. It operates automatically and cannot reason independently, yet remains open to the influence of the voluntary mind, which is the conscious and reasoning faculty. Through repetition and focused attention, the voluntary mind can stimulate, restrain, or completely alter the operations of the involuntary mind. In this way, the thoughts held most persistently become the dominant forces shaping both mental and physical states.

=== Voluntary, involuntary, and "involuntary-voluntary" ===
According to Parkyn, auto-suggestion operated through three distinct forms: voluntary, involuntary, and involuntary-voluntary. Voluntary auto-suggestion referred to the conscious and deliberate repetition of constructive thoughts or affirmations intended to reshape habits, behavior, or bodily function. Involuntary auto-suggestion occurred automatically, through impressions absorbed from one's surroundings, experiences, and emotions, without any deliberate effort. The third form, which Parkyn called "involuntary-voluntary auto-suggestion," combined both processes. It arose when a person consciously performed an action or followed instructions that unconsciously reinforced a mental impression. Parkyn illustrated this with the example of a patient who takes medicine prescribed for sleeplessness. Each time the dose is taken, the thought arises, "This medicine will quiet my nerves and help me sleep," regardless of whether the patient is aware of using suggestion. Similarly, individuals receiving "absent treatment" or "magnetic healing" engage in the same process by expecting beneficial results, thereby producing the therapeutic effect through their own suggestive belief.

Parkyn explained that this hybrid form of suggestion could be deliberately employed to achieve results even with skeptical patients. By assigning simple daily tasks, such as sipping water slowly or performing physical exercises, while emphasizing that these actions would bring improvement, the practitioner caused the patient to generate involuntary-voluntary auto-suggestions each time the task was performed. In this way, Parkyn showed that suggestion could operate at multiple levels of awareness and that much of what appeared to be external healing was, in fact, the individual's own mind responding to inner conviction.

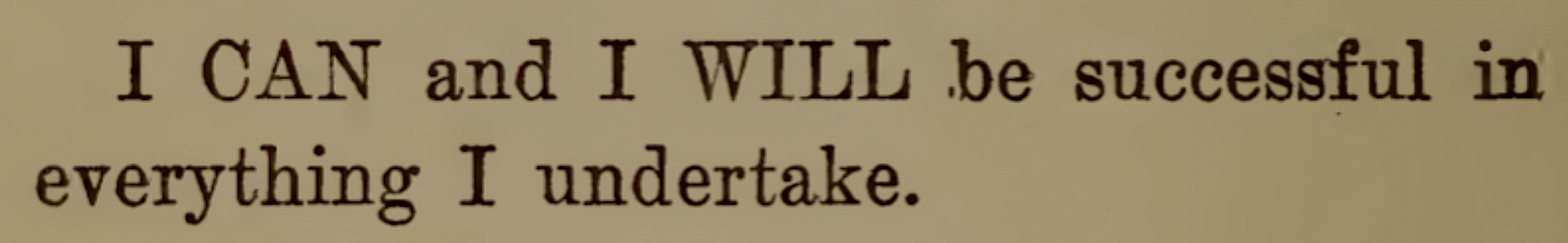
"I Can and I Will" was a central affirmation taught by Dr. Parkyn at the Chicago School of Psychology.

Parkyn’s teaching marked the earliest systematic methods for consciously using auto-suggestion as a scientific tool. He taught that "anything that suggests is a suggestion," meaning that every sensory perception, spoken word, or environmental influence affects the subconscious mind. Because of this, he cautioned against the use of negative suggestions, explaining that repeating what one wishes to avoid, such as "I will not fail" or "I cannot be nervous," tends to reinforce the very condition one intends to overcome. Instead, he urged his students to affirm what they desired directly, using positive, rhythmic statements such as "I can and I will."

The methods taught emphasized the disciplined use of repetition, emotional conviction, and concentrated attention to implant affirmative thoughts in the involuntary mind. Once impressed upon it, these ideas manifested naturally in behavior and bodily function. This systematic approach to auto-suggestion, developed more than two decades before Émile Coué popularized the term, became one of the most influential elements of Parkyn's teaching and laid the conceptual foundation for much of the later New Thought and self-mastery literature produced by his students and affiliated schools.

== Typological distinctions ==
Émile Coué identified two very different types of self-suggestion:

- intentional, "reflective autosuggestion": made by deliberate and conscious effort, and
- unintentional, "spontaneous auto-suggestion": which is a "natural phenomenon of our mental life … which takes place without conscious effort [and has its effect] with an intensity proportional to the keenness of [our] attention".

In relation to Coué's group of "spontaneous auto-suggestions", his student Charles Baudouin (1920, p. 41) made three further useful distinctions, based upon the sources from which they came:

- "Instances belonging to the representative domain
  (sensations, mental images, dreams, visions, memories, opinions, and all intellectual phenomena)."
- "Instances belonging to the affective domain
  (joy or sorrow, emotions, sentiments, tendencies, passions)."
- "Instances belonging to the active or motor domain
  (actions, volitions, desires, gestures, movements at the periphery or in the interior of the body, functional or organic modifications)."

== Émile Coué ==
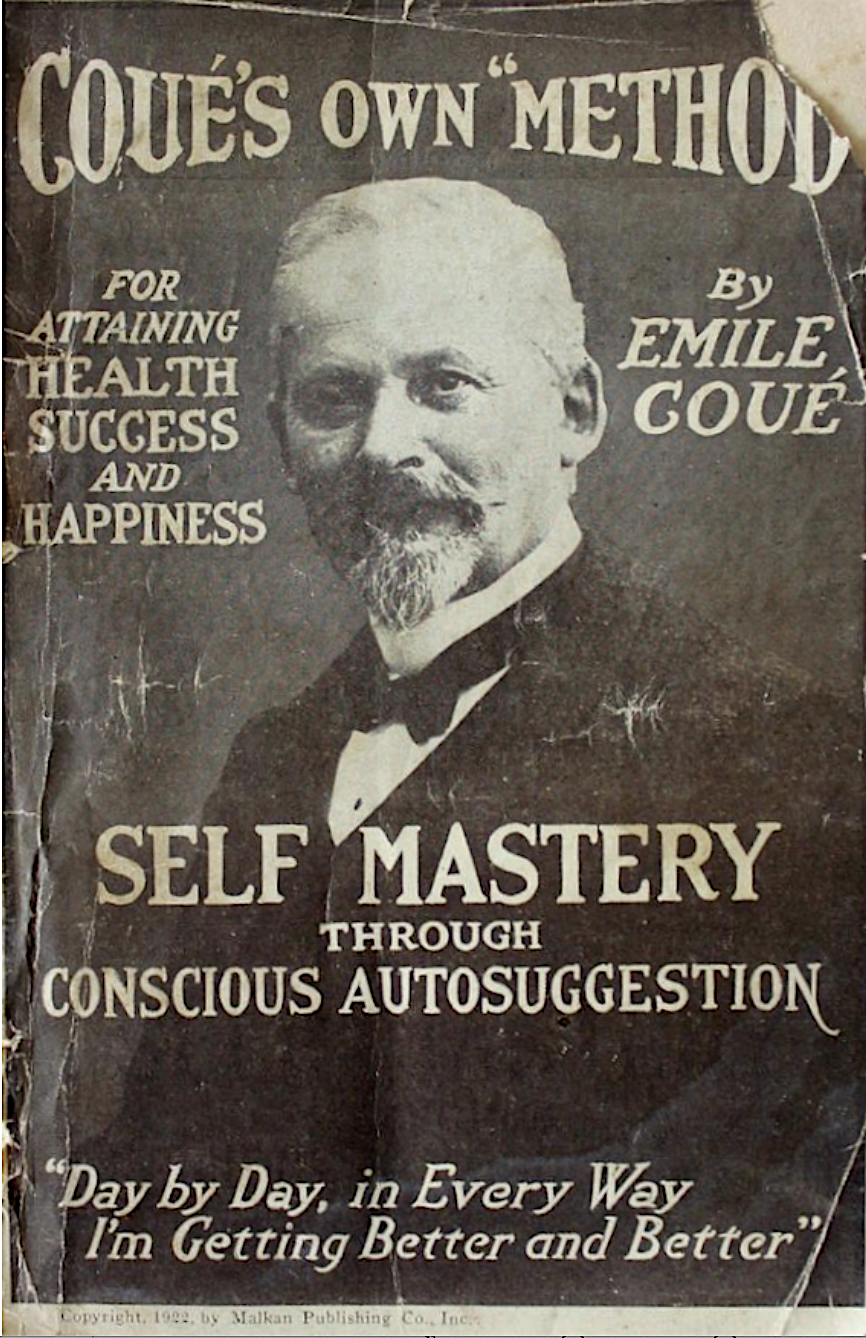
Émile Coué's 1922 book Self Mastery Through Conscious Autosuggestion. It drew heavily on Dr. Parkyn's earlier work, even adopting the slogan, "Health, Happiness, and Success."

Émile Coué, who had both B.A. and B.Sc. degrees before he was 21, graduated top of his class (with First Class Honours) with a degree in pharmacology from the prestigious Collège Sainte-Barbe in Paris in 1882. Having spent an additional six months as an intern at the Necker-Enfants Malades Hospital in Paris, he returned to Troyes, where he worked as an apothecary from 1882 to 1910.

=== "Hypnosis" à la Ambroise-Auguste Liébeault and Hippolyte Bernheim ===
In 1885, his investigations of hypnotism and the power of the imagination began with Ambroise-Auguste Liébeault and Hippolyte Bernheim, two leading exponents of "hypnosis", of Nancy, with whom he studied in 1885 and 1886 (having taken leave from his business in Troyes). Following this training, "he dabbled with ‘hypnosis’ in Troyes in 1886, but soon discovered that their Liébeault's techniques were hopeless, and abandoned ‘hypnosis’ altogether".

=== Hypnotism à la James Braid and Xenophon LaMotte Sage ===
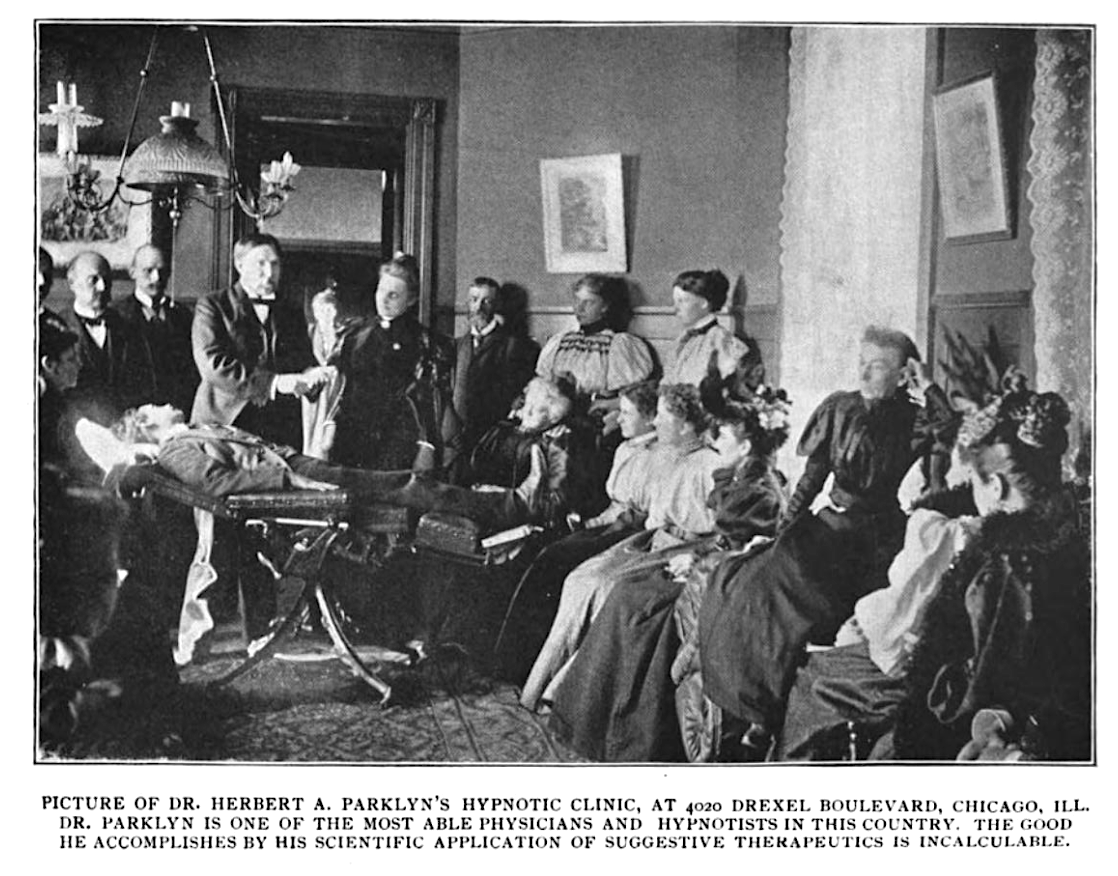
A picture from E. Virgil Neal's Hypnotism As It Is, when he was a student at Dr. Herbert A. Parkyn's Chicago School of Psychology in 1897

In 1901, Coué sent to the United States for a free book, Hypnotism as It is (i.e., Sage, 1900a), which purported to disclose "secrets [of the] science that brings business and social success" and "the hidden mysteries of personal magnetism, hypnotism, magnetic healing, etc.". Deeply impressed by its contents, he purchased the French language version of the associated correspondence course (i.e., Sage, 1900b, and 1900c), created by stage hypnotist extraordinaire, "Professor Xenophon LaMotte Sage, A.M., Ph.D., LL.D., of Rochester, New York" (who had been admitted into the prestigious Medico-Legal Society of New York in 1899).

In real life, Xenophon LaMotte Sage was none other than Ewing Virgil Neal (1868-1949), the multi-millionaire, calligrapher, hypnotist, publisher, advertising/marketing pioneer (he launched the career of Carl R. Byoir), pharmaceutical manufacturer, parfumier, international businessman, confidant of Mussolini, Commandatore of the Order of the Crown of Italy, Officer of the Legion of Honour, and fugitive from justice, who moved to France in the 1920s.

Sage's course supplied the missing piece of the puzzle — namely, Braid-style hypnotic inductions — the solution for which had, up to that time, eluded Coué:

"Coué immediately recognised that the course’s Braid-style of hypnotism was ideal for mental therapeutics. He undertook an intense study, and was soon skilled enough to offer hypnotism alongside his pharmaceutical enterprise. In the context of Liébeault’s ‘hypnosis’, Braid’s hypnotism, and Coué’s (later) discoveries about autosuggestion, one must recognise the substantially different orientations of Liébeault’s "suggestive therapeutics", which concentrated on imposing the coercive power of the operator’s suggestion, and Braid’s "psycho-physiology", which concentrated on activating the transformative power of the subject’s mind." — Yeates (2016a, p.13).

Although Coué had abandoned Liébeault's "hypnosis" in 1886, he adopted Braid's hypnotism in 1901; and, in fact, in addition to, and (often) separate from, his auto-suggestive practices, Coué actively used Braid's hypnotism for the rest of his professional life.

== Suggestion and Auto-suggestion ==
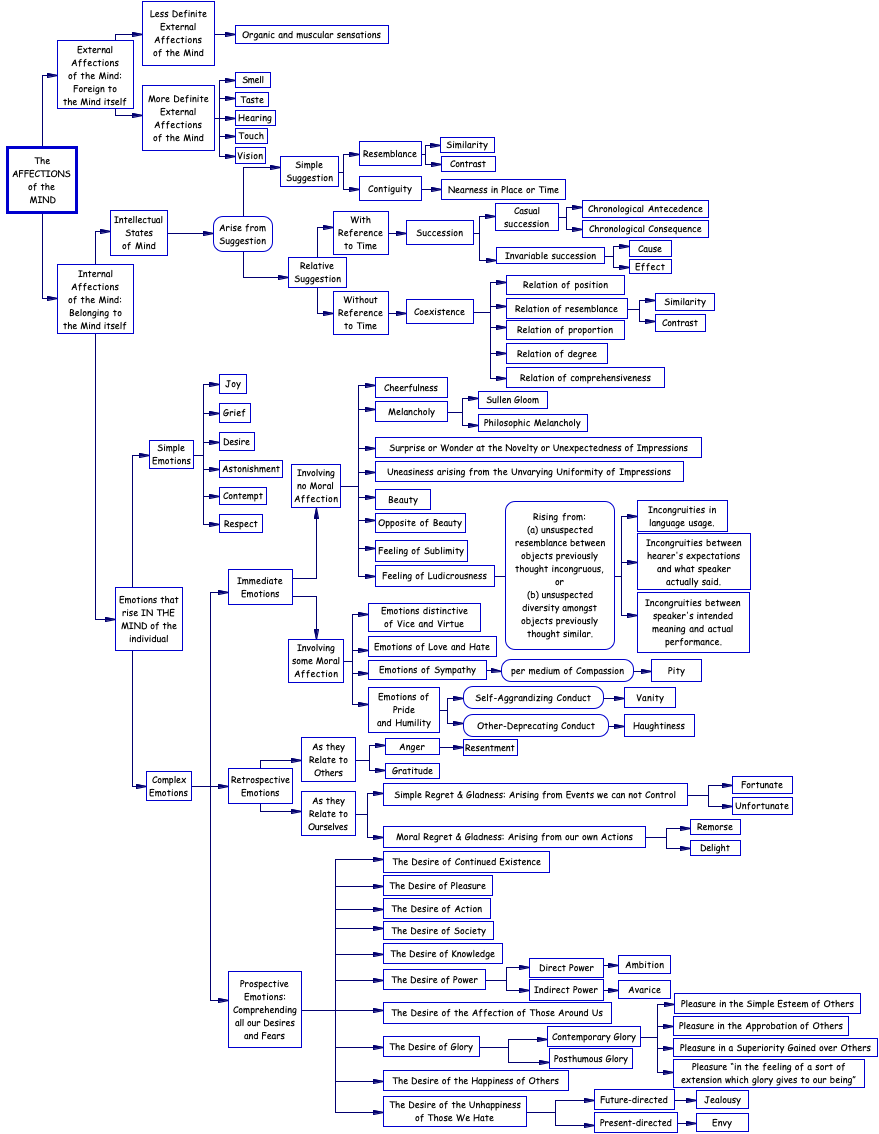
Brown's "Affections of the Mind", as discussed in his Lectures on the Philosophy of the Human Mind.

Coué was so deeply impressed by Bernheim's concept of “suggestive therapeutics” — in effect, "an imperfect re-branding of the ‘dominant idea’ theory that Braid had appropriated from Thomas Brown" — that, on his return to Troyes from his (1886–1886) interlude with Liébeault and Bernheim, he made a practice of reassuring his clients by praising each remedy's efficacy. He noticed that, in specific cases, he could increase a medicine's efficacy by praising its effectiveness. He realized that, when compared with those to whom he said nothing, those to whom he praised the medicine had a noticeable improvement (this is suggestive of what would later be identified as a "placebo response").

"Around 1903, Coué recommended a new patent medicine, based on its promotional material, which effected an unexpected and immediate cure (Baudouin, 1920, p.90; Shrout, 1985, p.36). Coué (the chemist) found “[by subsequent] chemical analysis in his laboratory [that there was] nothing in the medicine which by the remotest stretch of the imagination accounted for the results” (Shrout, ibid.). Coué (the hypnotist) concluded that it was cure by suggestion; but, rather than Coué having cured him, the man had cured himself by continuously telling himself the same thing that Coué had told him."

== The birth of "Conscious Autosuggestion" ==
Coué discovered that subjects could not be hypnotized against their will and, more importantly, that the effects of hypnotic suggestion waned when the subjects regained consciousness. He thus eventually developed the Coué method, and released his first book, Self-Mastery Through Conscious Autosuggestion (published in 1920 in England and two years later in the United States). He described autosuggestion itself as:

... an instrument that we possess at birth, and with which we play unconsciously all our life, as a baby plays with its rattle. It is however a dangerous instrument; it can wound or even kill you if you handle it imprudently and unconsciously. It can on the contrary save your life when you know how to employ it consciously.

Although Coué never doubted pharmaceutical medicine, and still advocated its application, he also came to believe that one's mental state could positively affect, and even amplify, the pharmaceutical action of medication. He observed that those patients who used his mantra-like conscious suggestion, "Every day, in every way, I'm getting better and better", (French: Tous les jours, à tous points de vue, je vais de mieux en mieux; lit. 'Every day, from all points of view, I'm getting better and better') — in his view, replacing their "thought of illness" with a new "thought of cure", could augment their pharmaceutical regimen in an efficacious way.

== The Coué method ==
La méthode Coué

Continuously, unjustly, and mistakenly trivialised as just a hand-clasp, some unwarranted optimism, and a ‘mantra’, Coué’s method evolved over several decades of meticulous observation, theoretical speculation, in-the-field testing, incremental adjustment, and step-by-step transformation.
It tentatively began (c.1901) with very directive one-to-one hypnotic interventions, based upon the approaches and techniques that Coué had acquired from an American correspondence course.
As his theoretical knowledge, clinical experience, understanding of suggestion and autosuggestion, and hypnotic skills expanded, it gradually developed into its final subject-centred version—an intricate complex of (group) education, (group) hypnotherapy, (group) ego-strengthening, and (group) training in self-suggested pain control; and, following instruction in performing the prescribed self-administration ritual, the twice daily intentional and deliberate (individual) application of its unique formula, "Every day, in every way, I’m getting better and better".
Yeates (2016c), p.55.

The Coué method centers on a routine repetition of this particular expression according to a specified ritual, in a given physical state, and in the absence of any sort of allied mental imagery, at the beginning and at the end of each day. Coué maintained that curing some of our troubles requires a change in our subconscious/unconscious thought, which can only be achieved by using our imagination. Although stressing that he was not primarily a healer but one who taught others to heal themselves, Coué claimed to have affected organic changes through autosuggestion.

=== Underlying principles ===
Coué thus developed a method which relied on the belief that any idea exclusively occupying the mind turns into reality, although only to the extent that the idea is within the realm of possibility. For instance, a person without hands will not be able to make them grow back. However, if a person firmly believes that his or her asthma is disappearing, then this may actually happen, as far as the body is actually able to physically overcome or control the illness. On the other hand, thinking negatively about the illness (e.g. "I am not feeling well") will encourage both mind and body to accept this thought.

=== Willpower ===
Coué observed that the main obstacle to autosuggestion was willpower. For the method to work, the patient must refrain from making any independent judgment, meaning that he must not let his will impose its own views on positive ideas. Everything must thus be done to ensure that the positive "autosuggestive" idea is consciously accepted by the patient, otherwise one may end up getting the opposite effect of what is desired.

Coué noted that young children always applied his method perfectly, as they lacked the willpower that remained present among adults. When he instructed a child by saying "clasp your hands" and then "you can't pull them apart" the child would thus immediately follow his instructions and be unable to unclasp their hands.

=== Self-conflict ===
Coué believed a patient's problems were likely to increase if his willpower and imagination opposed each other, something Coué referred to as "self-conflict." As the conflict intensifies, so does the problem (i.e., the more the patient consciously wants to sleep, the more he becomes awake). The patient must thus abandon his willpower and instead put more focus on his imaginative power in order to fully succeed with his cure.

=== Effectiveness ===
With his method, which Coué called "un truc," patients of all sorts would come to visit him. The list of ailments included kidney problems, diabetes, memory loss, stammering, weakness, atrophy and all sorts of physical and mental illnesses. According to one of his journal entries (1916), he apparently cured a patient of a uterus prolapse as well as "violent pains in the head" (migraine).

=== Evidence ===
Advocates of autosuggestion appeal to brief case histories published by Émile Coué describing his use of autohypnosis to cure, for example, enteritis and paralysis from spinal cord injury.

== Autogenic training ==
Autogenic training is an autosuggestion-centered relaxation technique influenced by the Coué method. In 1932, German psychiatrist Johannes Schultz developed and published on autogenic training.

=== Conceptual difference from Autosuggestion ===
By contrast with the conceptualization driving Coué's auto-suggestive self-administration procedure — namely, that constant repetition creates a situation in which "a particular idea saturates the microcognitive environment of 'the mind'…", which, then, in its turn, "is converted into a corresponding ideomotor, ideosensory, or ideoaffective action, by the ideodynamic principle of action", "which then, in its turn, generates the response" — the primary target of the entirely different self-administration procedure developed by Johannes Heinrich Schultz, known as Autogenic Training, was to affect the autonomic nervous system, rather than (as Coué's did) to affect 'the mind'.

=== Efficacy of Autogenic training ===
Although, as Myga, Kuehn & Azanon (2022) observe, there has been very little research into autosuggestion, there have been a number of clinical trials supporting the efficacy-claims for autogenic training; and, along with other relaxation techniques — such as progressive relaxation and meditation — has replaced Coué's method in therapy.

Wolfgang Luthe (Schultz's co-author) was a firm believer that autogenic training was a powerful approach that should only be offered to patients by qualified professionals.

== See also ==
- Abulia – Neurological symptom of lack of will or initiative
- Adaptive unconscious – Psychological theory
- Affirmations – Practice of positive thinking and self-empowerment
- Akrasia – Lack of self-control
- Behavioral confirmation
- Ego depletion – Psychological theory
- Enkrateia – Virtuous self-control
- Émile Coué – French psychologist (1857–1926)
- Eudaimonia – Human flourishing in ancient Greek philosophy
- Herbert A. Parkyn – Canadian psychologist (1870–1927)
- Hypnotic Ego-Strengthening Procedure – Hypnotherapeutic procedure
- Implicit self-esteem – Characteristic of human disposition
- Inner critic – Concept in psychology
- Learned helplessness – Psychological behavior
- Learned optimism – Concept in positive psychology
- Locus of control – Concept in psychology
- Medicus curat, natura sanat – Medical aphorism ("the physician treats, nature heals")
- Mind–body interventions – Health and fitness interventions
- Mind-wandering – Experience of thoughts not remaining on a single topic for a long period of time
- Nancy School of Hypnosis – French school of psychotherapy from 1866
- Neurasthenia – Psychological term
- Positive mental attitude – Importance of positive thinking as a contributing factor of success
- Positive psychology – Approach of psychological scientific study
- Psycho-Cybernetics – 1960 self-help book by Maxwell Maltz
- Psychoneuroimmunology – Area of study within psychosomatic medicine
- Psychosomatic medicine – Interdisciplinary medical field exploring various influences on bodily processes
- Salpêtrière School of Hypnosis – French school of psychotherapy from 1882
- Self-defeating prophecy – Prediction that prevents what it predicts from happening
- Self-determination theory – Macro theory of human motivation and personality
- Self-efficacy – Psychology concept
- Self-enhancement – Type of motivation
- Self-fulfilling prophecy – Prediction that causes itself to become true
- Self-healing – Refers to the process of recovery of animals after a trauma
- Self-help – Self-guided improvement
- Self-hypnosis – Form, process, or result of a self-induced hypnotic state
- Self-schema – Set of memories for a person
- Self-talk – Communication with oneself
- Subjective well-being – Self-reported measure of well-being
- Suggestion – Psychological process of guiding a person
- Telepathy – Psychic ability
- Think aloud protocol – Method to gather data in usability testing
- Thomas theorem – Sociological theory
- Vis medicatrix naturae – Latin phrase affirming the body's self-healing nature
- Visual thinking – Thinking through visual processing
- Vitalism – Belief about living organisms
- Well-being – Measure of how well someone's life is going
