= Self-hypnosis =

Form, process, or result of a self-induced hypnotic state

Self-hypnosis or auto-hypnosis (as distinct from hetero-hypnosis) is a form, a process, or the result of a self-induced hypnotic state.

Frequently, self-hypnosis is used as a vehicle to enhance the efficacy of self-suggestion; and, in such cases, the subject "plays the dual role of suggester and suggestee".

The nature of the auto-suggestive practice may be, at one extreme, "concentrative", wherein "all attention is so totally focused on (the words of the auto-suggestive formula, e.g. "Every day, in every way, I'm getting better and better") that everything else is kept out of awareness" and, at the other, "inclusive", wherein subjects "allow all kinds of thoughts, emotions, memories, and the like to drift into their consciousness".

== Typological distinctions ==
From their extensive investigations, Erika Fromm and Stephen Kahn (1990) identified significant and distinctive differences between the application of the wide variety of practices that lie within the domain commonly, equivocally, and ambiguously identified as "self-hypnosis". Based upon their distinctions, "self-hypnosis" practices can be separated into, at least, thirteen different types:

	Hypnotist Involved	Hypnotist Induced	Clinically Defined?	Suggestion Involved?	Source of Suggestions
1	Yes	Yes	Yes	No	?
2	Yes	Yes	Yes	Yes	Experimenter-initiated or clinician-initiated suggestions.
3	Yes	Yes	Yes	Yes	Subject's "self-initiated suggestions" and/or "self-directed responses."
4	Yes	No	Yes	No	?
5	Yes	No	Yes	Yes	Experimenter-initiated or clinician-initiated suggestions.
6	Yes	No	Yes	Yes	Subject's "self-initiated suggestions" and/or "self-directed responses."
7	No	No	Yes	No	?
8	No	No	Yes	Yes	Experimenter-initiated or clinician-initiated suggestions.
9	No	No	Yes	Yes	Subject's "self-initiated suggestions" and/or "self-directed responses."
10	No	No	Yes	Yes	Subject uses suggestions, affirmations, mantras, etc. taken from self-help books
11	?	No	No	No	?
12	?	No	No	Yes	Subject's "self-initiated suggestions" and/or "self-directed responses."
13	?	No	No	Yes	Subject uses suggestions, affirmations, mantras, etc. taken from self-help books.

== History ==
=== James Braid ===
The English term "hypnotism" was introduced in 1841 by the Scottish physician and surgeon James Braid. According to Braid, he first employed "self-hypnotism" (as he elsewhere refers to it) two years after discovering hypnotism, first teaching it to his clients before employing it on himself:

My first experiments on this point [i.e., self-hypnosis] were instituted in the presence of some friends on the 1st May, 1843, and following days. I believe they were the first experiments of the kind which had ever been tried, and they have succeeded in every case in which I have so operated.

In a later work, Observations on Trance or Human Hybernation (1850), Braid provides probably the first account of self-hypnosis:

It is commonly said that seeing is believing, but feeling is the very truth. I shall, therefore, give the result of my experience of hypnotism in my own person. In the middle of September, 1844, I suffered from a most severe attack of rheumatism, implicating the left side of the neck and chest, and the left arm. At first the pain was moderately severe, and I took some medicine to remove it; but, instead of this, it became more and more violent, and had tormented me for three days, and was so excruciating, that it entirely deprived me of sleep for three nights successively, and on the last of the three nights I could not remain in any one posture for five minutes, from the severity of the pain. On the forenoon of the next day, whilst visiting my patients, every jolt of the carriage I could only compare to several sharp instruments being thrust through my shoulder, neck, and chest. A full inspiration was attended with stabbing pain, such as is experienced in pleurisy. When I returned home for dinner I could neither turn my head, lift my arm, nor draw a breath, without suffering extreme pain. In this condition I resolved to try the effects of hypnotism. I requested two friends, who were present, and who both understood the system, to watch the effects, and arouse me when I had passed sufficiently into the condition; and, with their assurance that they would give strict attention to their charge, I sat down and hypnotised myself, extending the extremities. At the expiration of nine minutes they aroused me, and, to my agreeable surprise, I was quite free from pain, being able to move in any way with perfect ease. I say agreeably surprised, on this account; I had seen like results with many patients; but it is one thing to hear of pain, and another to feel it. My suffering was so exquisite that I could not imagine anyone else ever suffered so intensely as myself on that occasion; and, therefore, I merely expected a mitigation, so that I was truly agreeably surprised to find myself quite free from pain. I continued quite easy all the afternoon, slept comfortably all night, and the following morning felt a little stiffness, but no pain. A week thereafter I had a slight return, which I removed by hypnotising myself once more; and I have remained quite free from rheumatism ever since, now nearly six years.

=== Émile Coué ===
Émile Coué was one of the most influential figures in the subsequent development of self-hypnosis. His method of "conscious autosuggestion" became an internationally renowned self-help system at the start of the 20th century. Although Coué distanced himself from the concept of "hypnosis", he sometimes referred to what he was doing as self-hypnosis, as did his followers such as Charles Baudouin. Modern hypnotherapists regard Coué as part of their own field.

=== Autogenic training ===
Autogenic training is a relaxation technique developed by the German psychiatrist Johannes Schultz and first published in 1932. Schultz based his approach on the work of the German hypnotist Oskar Vogt. The technique involves a step-by-step progression that begins from physiological conditioning, such as muscle relaxation, breathing control and heart rate control. Then it advances to psychic conditioning through mental imagery, acoustic therapy, etc.

== Steps commonly used for self-hypnosis ==
Self-hypnosis requires four distinct steps.

1. Motivation. Without proper motivation, an individual will find it very difficult to practice self-hypnosis.
2. Relaxation. The individual must be thoroughly relaxed and must set aside time to perform this act. Additionally, distractions should be eliminated as full attention is needed.
3. Concentration. The individual needs to concentrate completely as progress is made each time the mind focuses on a single image.
4. Directing. This is an option used only when the individual wants to work on a specific goal. The individual must direct their concentration on visualizing the desired result.

== Uses ==
Self-hypnosis is used extensively in modern hypnotherapy. It can take the form of hypnosis carried out by means of a learned routine.

Hypnosis may help pain management, anxiety, depression, sleep disorders, obesity, asthma, and skin conditions. When this practice is mastered, it can improve concentration, recall, enhance problem solving, alleviate headaches and even improve one's control of emotions.

=== Pain ===
Fromm & Kaplan observe that the value, significance, and importance of self-hypnosis is not just that it promotes relaxation, relieves tension and anxiety, and reduces the level of physical pain and suffering, but also that, in teaching patients self-hypnosis, clinicians sensibly recognize that they can't be with their patients at all times—especially, at those times when they are in pain—and, through that process of teaching self-hypnosis, they actively provide their patients with a 24-hours-a-day-available "tool by means of which they can learn to control and master it, or at least be able to live with reduced pain".

Self-hypnosis permits the individual to be in charge and therefore helps the patient to get out of the role of the victim who suffers and into the role of the person who masters or attempts to master her pain. Through practicing self-hypnosis, patients can learn to isolate the feared pain that accompanies many a medical intervention; they can productively dissociate themselves into a position in which they can enjoy pleasurable fantasies and memories, away from the negative aspects of their current reality.

=== Self-hypnosis and stress ===
Patients who are stressed and/or lack self-esteem can be taught self-hypnosis techniques which can induce relaxation and/or strengthen their self-esteem. Specifically, once the patient is in a self-hypnotic state the therapist can communicate messages to the patient, allowing the relaxation and strengthening process to occur.

Often, when teaching self-hypnosis, a subject is taught a specific "trigger word" (that will only induce self-hypnosis when the subject deliberately uses the word to hypnotize themselves) to facilitate the rapid induction of the hypnotic state. Also, a phrase (often termed an "autosuggestion") might be taught to the subject for them to repeat to themselves when in self-hypnosis.

In addition, since stress prevents well-functioning of the immune system, researchers from the Ohio State University came to a conclusion that self hypnosis to prevent stress can also help in protecting the immune system against the negative effects of it. They proved this by showing that students who performed self-hypnosis during stressful exam weeks showed a stronger immune system when compared to those who did not learn self-hypnosis.

=== Childbirth anesthesia ===
Self-hypnosis can help women who are in labor to alleviate their pain. Joseph DeLee, an obstetrician, stated in the early 20th century that hypnosis was the only risk-free childbirth anesthetic. Common self-hypnotic techniques include:

1. Glove anesthesia: Pretending the hand is numb and placing it upon a painful region to remove the sensation there.
2. Time distortion: Perceiving periods of time accompanied by pain as shorter in length and those free of pain as longer lasting.
3. Imaginative transformation: Viewing the pain as a non-threatening, acceptable sensation (perhaps merely pressure) that causes no trouble.

=== Other uses ===
Self-directed thought which is based in hypnosis can be used for many other issues and behavioral problems.

== Research ==
Reviewing the findings of three previous studies in this area, John F. Kihlstrom concluded: "Comparisons of self-hypnosis with more traditional 'hetero'-hypnosis show that they are highly correlated." At the same time, Kihlstrom questioned the extent to which most self-hypnosis qualitatively resembled the experience of traditional hetero-hypnosis.

== See also ==
- Autosuggestion – Psychological technique related to the placebo effect
- Covert conditioning – Approach to mental health treatment
- Guided meditation – Techniques to train attention and awareness
