= Gilbert Grellet =

French journalist and writer (born 1946)

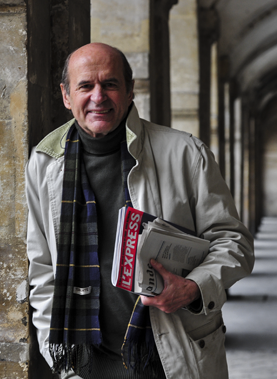
- Grellet at Places des Vosges in 2016
- Born: June 30, 1946 (age 80); Bordeaux, France
- Education: HEC Paris
- Occupations: Journalist and writer
- Employer: Agence France-Presse
- Children: Vanessa Grellet
- Writing career
- Period: 1972–present
- Genres: Historical; Thriller
- Notable awards: Best thriller, France (1988)

Gilbert Grellet (born June 30, 1946, in Bordeaux, France), is a French journalist who dedicated his entire career to Agence France-Presse (AFP), one of the three leading global news agencies, alongside Reuters and the Associated Press. In addition to his journalistic work, Grellet is an author of several historical books.

== Biography ==
=== Private life and education ===
The son of a diplomat, Gilbert Grellet graduated in 1969 from the École des Hautes Études Commerciales, France's foremost business school. He began his career at AFP in 1972 following two years of military cooperation in Mauritania, from 1969 to 1971, where he served as an adviser to the BCEAO.

Gilbert Grellet is the father of the investor and businesswoman Vanessa Grellet.

=== Career at Agence France-Presse ===
Grellet joined AFP in 1972, where he began his career with several positions. From 1972 to 1977, he served as the economic and financial correspondent in New York City. He then moved to Brasilia, where he was the bureau chief from 1977 to 1979. Following this, he returned to Paris to head the economic desk from 1979 to 1983.

He was subsequently appointed Washington bureau chief, a position he held from 1983 to 1987 when he interviewed the President of the United States Ronald Reagan. Grellet then took on the role of worldwide commercial director of AFP from 1987 to 1995, followed by his tenure as director for Europe and Africa from 1995 to 2001, and director for external relations and partnerships from 2001 to 2005.

After serving as the Madrid Bureau Chief from 2005 to 2010, he returned to Paris to lead a new publishing department until his retirement in mid-2016.

From 1995 to 2001, Grellet also held the position of non-executive chairman of AFX News, a financial news company based in London, which was a joint venture of AFP and the Financial Times.

== Literary contributions ==
Grellet is also an author. His first book, Le Souffle Austral, co-written with Hervé Guilbaud, was published in 1988 by Flammarion. This thriller, which was awarded the prize for the best thriller published in France that year, was translated into several languages, including English, and released in the United States under the title Wind of Death by Berg Publishers.

In 1990, Grellet, in collaboration with René Centassi, published Tous les jours de mieux en mieux through Robert Laffont. This book focuses on the life and work of French pharmacist Emile Coué, a pioneer of modern positive thinking. Grellet has also authored historical works such as Aux Frontières du Monde, which explores the significant global explorations at the end of the 19th century and the beginning of the 20th century, based on articles from the French geographical review Le Tour du Monde, akin to the National Geographic magazine.

One of his more recent works, Un été impardonnable, edited by Albin Michel in 2016, examines the first three months of the Spanish Civil War and the controversial non-intervention policy adopted by the main Western democracies (the United Kingdom, France, and the United States), which refused to assist the Spanish Republic in the face of a military uprising supported by Hitler and Mussolini. This book features a foreword by Manuel Valls, the 98th Prime Minister of France of Spanish descent

== Awards ==
- (1988) Best thriller in France for Wind of Death.

== Books ==
- Grellet, Gilbert; Guilbaud, Hervé (1990). Wind of Death (in English, French, Japanese, Swedish, and Romanian). Paris: Berg Publishers. p. 259. ISBN 978-0930267285.
- Grellet, Gilbert; Centassi, René (1990). Tous les jours de mieux en mieux : Emile Coué et sa méthode réhabilitée (in French, Spanish, and Italian). Paris: Robert Laffont. p. 259. ISBN 978-2221066812.
- Grellet, Gilbert (1991). Martin s'en revient d'Amérique (in French). Paris: Jean Picollec. p. 189. ISBN 2-86477111X.
- Grellet, Gilbert (2011). Aux Frontières du monde (in French). Paris: Jean Picollec. p. 592. ISBN 978-2864772545.
- Grellet, Gilbert (2013). La Nature en fureur (in French). Paris: Gallimard & AFP. p. 192. ISBN 978-2742435944.
- Grellet, Gilbert (2014). Sport : Photographier l'exploit (in French). Paris: Armand Colin & AFP. p. 144. ISBN 978-2200289492.
- Grellet, Gilbert (2014). Le monde en fêtes (in French). Paris: Gallimard & AFP. p. 184. ISBN 978-2742438174.
- Grellet, Gilbert (2016). Un été impardonnable — 1936 : la guerre d'Espagne et le scandale de la non-intervention (in French and Spanish). Paris: Albin Michel. p. 300. ISBN 978-2226320001.
- Grellet, Gilbert (2021). Pour la beauté du jeu (in French). Paris: Éditions Kéro. p. 200. ISBN 978-2702168349.
- Grellet, Gilbert (2023). Lectures incorrectes : Classiques et best-sellers sur le gril (in French). Paris: Self-published. p. 118. ISBN 978-2958606718.
