= E. Virgil Neal =

American stage hypnotist, and businessman

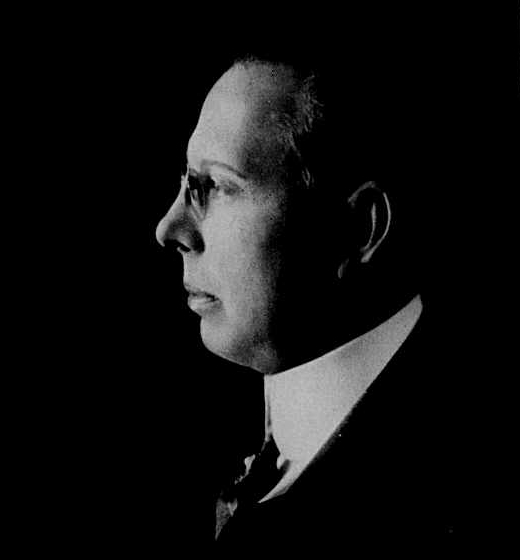
- Born: Ewing Virgil Neal; September 25, 1868; Georgetown, Missouri, US
- Died: June 30, 1949 (aged 80); Geneva, Switzerland
- Other name: Xenophon LaMotte Sage
- Occupations: Hypnotist, fraudster, manufacturer of patent medicines and cosmetics
- Spouses: Mollie Hurd Neal (m.1893); Harriett Meta Meister (m.1911); Renée Bodier (m.1924)
- Children: 1 son

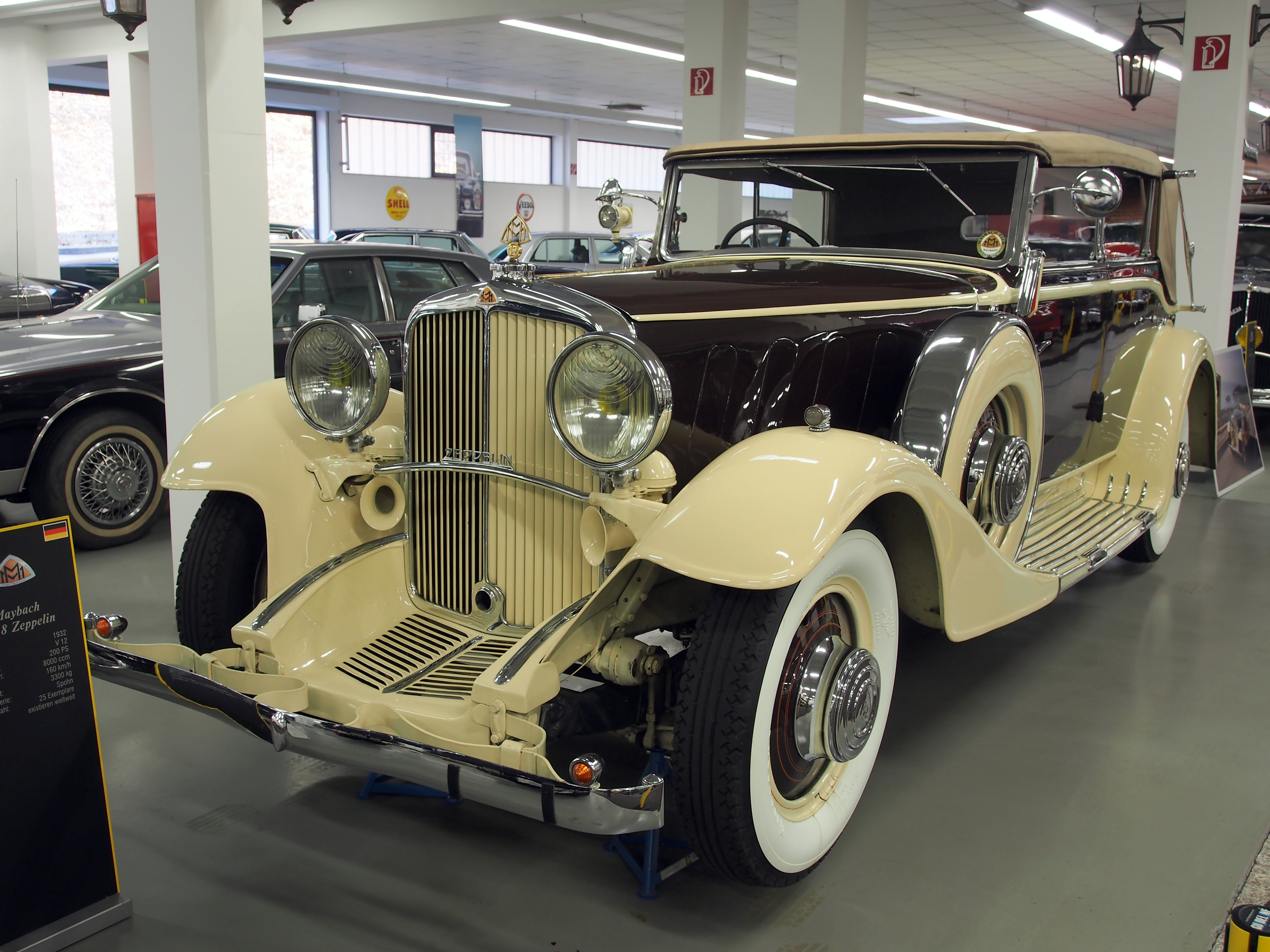
A 1932 Maybach Zeppelin, similar to that owned by Neal

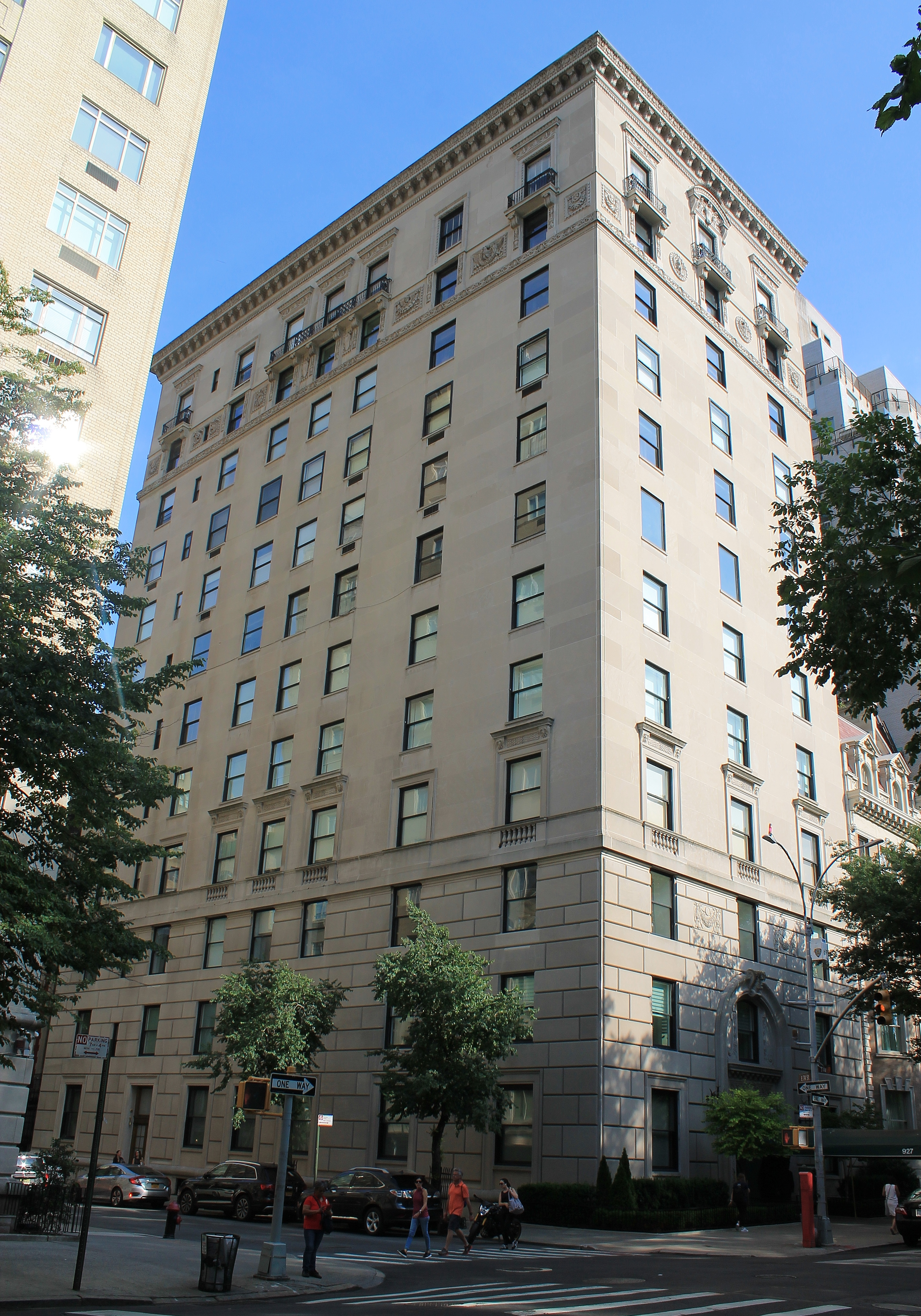
927 Fifth Avenue, Neal's residence in New York City

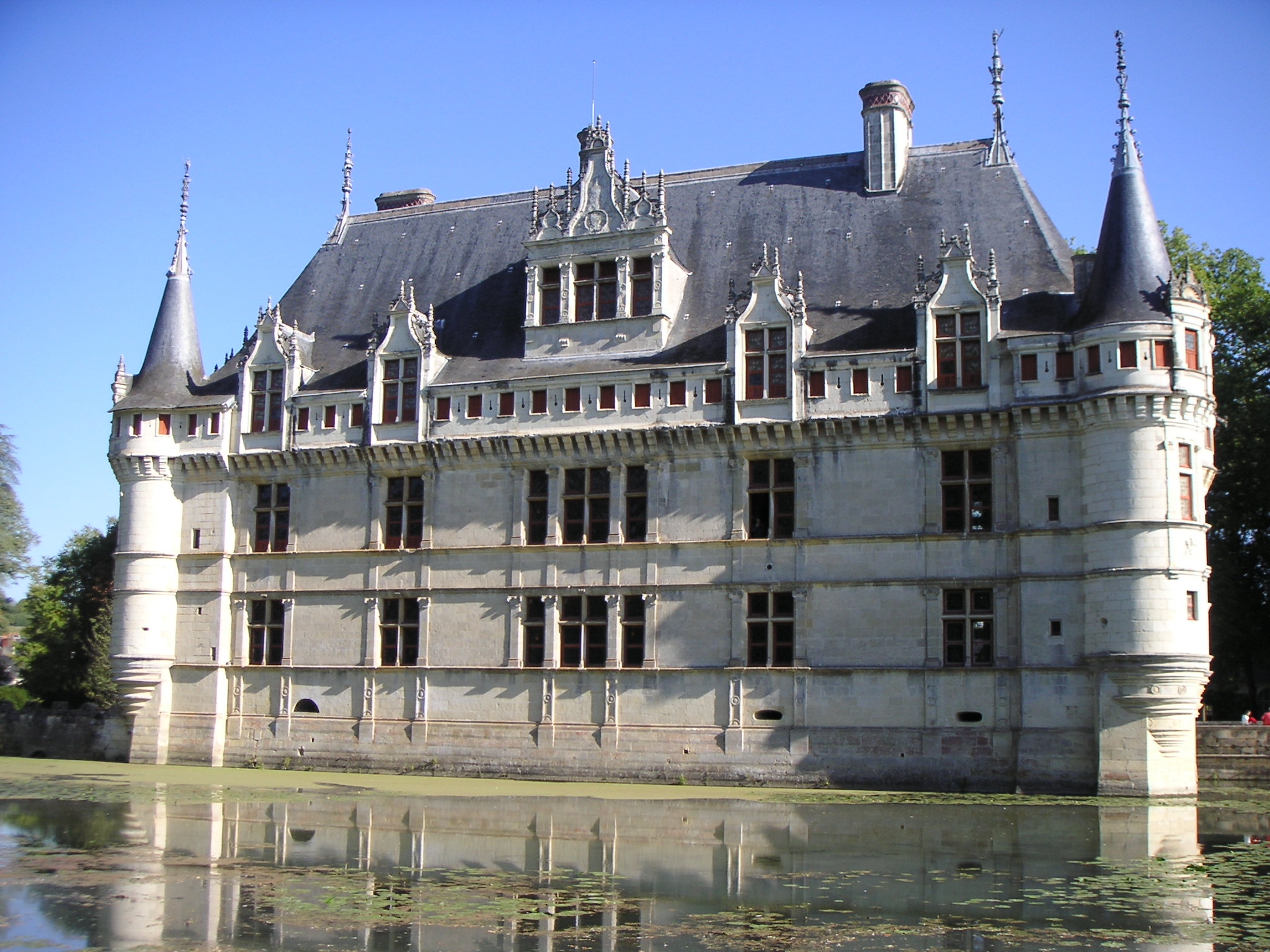
Château d'Azay-le-Rideau, after which his Château d'Azur was modelled

Ewing Virgil Neal (September 25, 1868 – June 30, 1949) was an American stage hypnotist (as Xenophon LaMotte Sage), author, and a wealthy manufacturer of patent medicines and cosmetics. He spent much time in Paris and the French Riviera, and built the Château d'Azur in the hills above Nice. The street address is now Avenue Virgile-Neal.

== Early life ==
Ewing Virgil Neal (known as “E. Virgil”) was born on September 25, 1868, in Georgetown, Missouri.

His father, Armistead Arthur Neal (1925–1898), was born in Kentucky, served in the Union Army during the Civil War, was a mason and, as a highly respected educator, served as the county school superintendent of Pettis County from 1870 to 1872. His mother, Cornelia Ellen Reese (1846–1924), was a well-educated woman, and a descendant of General Clark of the Lewis and Clark Expedition. He had two sisters, Ardelle Lenore Neal (1871–1950), later Mrs. John Clarence Sterling, and Margaret Pearl Neal (1872–1930), later Mrs. Frederick Francis Fitzpatrick.

Neal married three times: to Mollie Hurd (1873–1944) in 1893; to Harriett Meta Meister (1884–) in 1911; and to Renée Pauline Bodier (1873–1982) in 1924, with whom he had one child, Xen LaMotte Neal (1924–1996).

== Career ==
Neal worked as an instructor at Robbins’ Central Business College in Sedalia, Missouri. Together with a few colleagues, he went to a hypnotism show by Sylvain A. Lee, and saw "a blindfold drive, a window sleeper, and a cataleptic burial." As a result, they all then trained as hypnotists and left their college jobs.

Neal and his wife Mollie toured the US as a stage hypnotist, performing as Xenophon LaMotte Sage and Helen Olga Sage.

In 1904, he travelled to Europe and used tea sweepings to make caffeine. He then went into business with physician Dr. Herbert Arthur Parkyn and fellow hypnotist Elmer Sidney Prather, "running a complex network of fraudulent mail-order schemes." They offered courses in the invented "Science of Salesmanship", and sold various worthless patent medicines and treatments, such as wrinkle eradicators, weight reducers, bust developers, hair restorers, "Nuxated Iron", and "cartilage stretchers".

Neal eventually moved into mainstream beauty products, establishing the brand Tokalon, manufacturing powders and creams at factories in Paris and London, and sold them in 100 countries.

Neal also produced fragrances, including Petalia and Captivant de Tokalon that were sold in Lalique bottles. In February 2022, a 1923 René Lalique Petalia bottle sold for £25,000.

In the 1920s and 1930s, Neal spent much time on the French Riviera, and had the Château d'Azur built in the hills above Nice. The Château d'Azur, designed by the architect Adrien Rey, as a replica of the Château d'Azay-le-Rideau, was completed in 1932. Neal was known locally as Le Duc, and entertained lavishly in his "genially overdecorated" Château. It sits in landscaped grounds of five hectares (12 acres), and is now nine separate residences. The street address is Avenue Virgile-Neal.

== Personal life ==
In 1900, he was a publisher, living in Rochester, New York, with his wife Molly H. Neal, born May 1876, (both born in Missouri, all parents born in Kentucky) and one servant.

In September 1910, E. Virgil Neal and his wife traveled from Monte Carlo to Rome with General James R. O’Beirne. Through an introduction from Archbishop John Ireland, the group was granted a private audience with the Pope in the Pontiff's private library.

In February 1912, E. Virgil Neal and his wife visited President William Howard Taft at the White House. The President arranged a special appointment to meet them, and they spent half an hour with him.

In 1914 and 1919, he was married to Harriett Meta Meister, born April 8, 1884, in Brooklyn, New York, and they were living at 927 Fifth Avenue, New York City.

In 1933, he arrived in New York City from Southampton, England, on the SS Europa with his wife Renée Bodier (age 36, born in Paris), his son Xen LaMotte Neal (born October 13, 1924, in Paris), a secretary, maid, valet, and chauffeur.

In 1933, Neal sent his "magnificent" Maybach Zeppelin limousine back to France, along with his "buxom young wife, his buxom young French secretary, his 9-year-old son Xen LaMotte Neal (named after the father's stage name), maids, valet, 30 trunks, 40 other pieces of luggage." His prize possession was a green leather booklet signed by Benito Mussolini, which he called his "Fascist Membership Card". Neal said, "Mussolini never gives his signature. Great man, Mussolini. We talk in French because I don't know much Italian."

== Death ==
Neal died in Geneva, Switzerland, on June 30, 1949.

== Honours ==
In January 1930, in celebration of the marriage of Crown Prince Umberto of Italy to Marie-José of Belgium, the King of Italy, Victor Emmanuel III, conferred the cravat/necklet of Commander of the Crown of Italy upon Neal.

In July 1939, Neal was made an Officer of the Legion of Honour.

== Publications ==
- Neal, E.V. (1899), Modern Banking and Bank Accounting: Containing a Complete Exposition of the Most Approved Methods of Bank Accounting; Designed as a Text Book for Schools and Private Students and a Handbook of Reference for Bankers, New York, NY: Williams & Rogers.
- Neal, E.V. & Cragin, C.T. (1900), Modern Illustrative Bookkeeping: Designed as a Text-Book for All Schools Giving a Course in Business Training: Complete Course, New York, NY: American Book Company.
- Neal, E.V. & Moore, J.H. (1902), Modern Illustrative Banking, New York, NY: American Book Company.
- Neal, E.V. & Cragin, C.T. (1909), Modern Illustrative Bookkeeping: Introductory Course (Revised and Enlarged by D.D. Mueller), New York, NY: American Book Company.
- Neal, E.V. & Cragin, C.T. (1911), Modern Illustrative Bookkeeping: Complete Course (Revised and Enlarged by D.D. Mueller & J.E. King), New York, NY: American Book Company.

== See also ==
- Carl R. Byoir
