= Self-healing =

Refers to the process of recovery of animals after a trauma

Self-healing refers to the process of recovery (generally from psychological disturbances, trauma, etc.), motivated by and directed by the patient, guided often only by instinct. Such a process encounters mixed fortunes due to its amateur nature, although self-motivation is a major asset. The value of self-healing lies in its ability to be tailored to the unique experience and requirements of the individual. The process can be helped and accelerated with introspection techniques such as meditation.

== The different meanings of self-healing ==
Self-healing may refer to automatic, homeostatic processes of the body that are controlled by physiological mechanisms inherent in the organism. Disorders of the spirit and the absence of faith can be self-healed.

In a figurative sense, self-healing properties can be ascribed to systems or processes, which by nature or design tend to correct any disturbances brought into them. Such as the regeneration of the skin after a cut or scrape, or of an entire limb. The injured party (the living body) repairs the damaged part by itself.

Beyond the innate restorative capacities of the physical body, there are many factors of psychological nature that can influence self-healing. Hippocrates, considered by many to be the father of medical treatment, observed: "The physician must be ready, not only to do his duty himself, but also to secure the co-operation of the patient, of the attendants and of externals."

Self-healing may also be achieved through deliberately applied psychological mechanisms. These approaches may improve the psychological and physical conditions of a person. Research confirms that this can be achieved through numerous mechanisms, including relaxation, breathing exercises, fitness exercises, imagery, Meditation, Yoga, qigong, tai chi, biofeedback, and various forms of psychotherapy, among other approaches.

Varieties of mechanisms for self-healing have been proposed, including:

1. Decreases in stress hormones that may impair physiological functions when there is chronic stress.
2. Decreases in muscle tension, which can worsen or produce pains in muscles, tendons and joints when there is chronic muscle tension due to stress.
3. Improved sleep that can be achieved through relaxation, which improves physiological functions.
4. Improvements in emotional tensions, depression, anger and other emotions that can otherwise impair social relationships and functioning in the workplace, leading to vicious circles of increased psychological symptoms.

Another phrase that often includes self-healing is self-help. In 2013 Kathryn Schulz examined it as "an $11 billion industry".

== See also ==
- Self-healing material
- Vis medicatrix naturae
- Orthopathy
- DNA repair, a self-repair mechanism
