= Georg Groddeck =

German physician and psychoanalyst (1866–1934)

Georg Walther Groddeck (German: [ˈɡʁɔdɛk]; 13 October 1866 – 10 June 1934) was a German physician and writer regarded as a pioneer of psychosomatic medicine.

== Early life ==
Groddeck was born in Bad Kösen, Saxony, to a Lutheran family. His works before World War I wholly accepted eugenics and Völkisch movement ideology.

== Selected publications ==
In 1902, Groddeck published his first book, Ein Frauenproblem, dedicated to his wife; in 1909, the book Hin zu Gottnatur was released.

In 1913, he published Nasamecu. Der gesunde und der kranke Mensch (The healthy and the sick person), where "nasamecu" stands for the Latin motto "natura sanat, medicus curat". Here, Groddeck offers his understanding of what happens to the bones, muscles, the importance of food, talk about blood circulation, the eyes, the whole human body and what happens to this body when it obeys the orders of Isso (unconscious). According to these orders, a person becomes "healthy" or "sick."

In 1921, Groddeck published his first psychoanalytic novel, Der Seelensucher. Ein psychoanalytischer Roman (The Soul-Seeker). An English translation remains unpublished. After reading it and promoting its publication Freud commended Groddeck to the Berlin Psychoanalytic Association. Alfred Polgar in his comprehensive review (Berliner Tageblatt, 20 December 1921) found "nothing comparable among German books" and felt reminded of Cervantes, Swift and Rabelais.

In 1923, he published Das Buch vom Es, an unusual work in which each chapter is in the form of a letter to a (fictional) girlfriend addressed as "my dear".

== Association with Sigmund Freud and psychoanalysis ==
In his introduction to the 1949 English version of Groddeck's Das Buch vom Es (1923), Lawrence Durrell comments that Groddeck is often mistaken for an orthodox disciple of Sigmund Freud. He goes on to say "Groddeck was the only analyst whose views had some effect on Freud", and "while he accepts and employs much of the heavy equipment of the master, he is separated forever from Freud by an entirely different conception of the constitution and functioning of the human psyche."

Freud mentions Groddeck in The Ego and the Id, crediting him with giving a name to what Freud had already given a local habitation, to wit, the Id.

Now I think we shall gain a great deal by following the suggestion of a writer who, from personal motives, vainly asserts that he has nothing to do with the rigours of pure science. I am speaking of Georg Groddeck, who is never tired of insisting that what we call our ego behaves essentially passively in life, and that, as he expresses it, we are "lived" by unknown and uncontrollable forces. We have all had impressions of the same kind, even though they may not have overwhelmed us to the exclusion of all others, and we need feel no hesitation in finding a place for Groddeck's discovery in the structure of science. I propose to take it into account by calling the entity which starts out from the system Pcpt. and begins by being Pcs. the "ego", and by following Groddeck in calling the other part of the mind, into which this entity extends and which behaves as though it were Ucs., the "id". (Freud 1927/1961, 13).

Groddeck eventually had acrimonious disagreement with Freud about the definition and limitations of the It/Id/das Es. (Note: Freud never used the terms ego and id in his writings. These were translations of his German terms das Ich and das Es, which were common German words for "The I" and "The it" (Mills 2010, p. 89).) Groddeck regarded the ego as an extension or a mask for the id, whereas Freud regarded them as separate constructs.

In contrast to Freud, Groddeck was primarily engaged with the treatment of chronically ill patients. Groddeck is considered by many as a founder of psychosomatic medicine – his reservations against strict science and orthodox medicine made him an outsider among psychoanalysts till today.

Groddeck was a controversial but important figure within the psychoanalytic movement. He attended the congress of the German Psychoanalytic Association in 1930. He was invited to lecture to the British Psychoanalytic Society in 1928, and invited by Felix Boehm to lecture at the Berlin Institute in 1930. Eitingon disliked Groddeck until being treated by him in 1928, after which he regarded him warmly.

== Views ==
=== Psychosomatic integrative approach ===
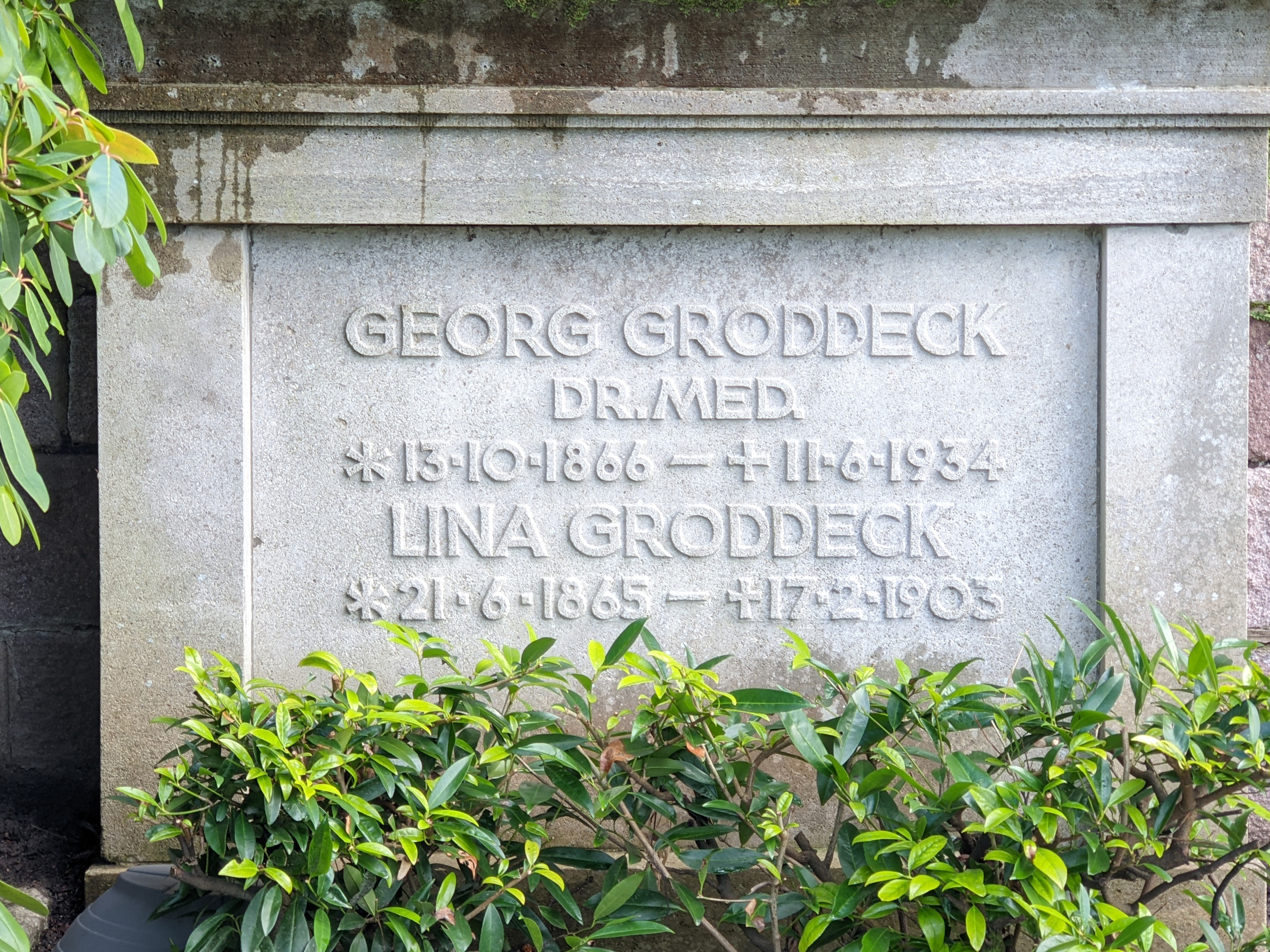
Grave monument in the main cemetery of Baden-Baden

Zen philosopher Alan Watts said that when people came to Groddeck for analysis, he would give them a massage, and when they came to him for a massage, he would give them analysis.

"He who draws the conclusion that I mentally medicate a human who has broken his leg is very true – but I adjust the fracture and dress the wound. And then – I give him a massage, make exercises with him, give a daily bath to the leg with water at 45 °C for half an hour and I take care that he does neither gorge nor booze, and every now and then I ask him: Why did you break your leg, you yourself ?"

With such and other methods the German physician Georg Groddeck, who practised in Baden-Baden and was the pathfinder of psychosomatic medicine, astonished his numerous listeners and readers. His therapy connects naturopathic treatment with psychoanalytic, suggestive and hypnotic elements. His foot and arm bath, massages and dietary cuisine are still practised today, although the bold doctrine of salvation, where he vigorously massaged his patients, is necessarily quite authoritarian, and a more reserved approach would be judged appropriate today. He said, “To provide obedience [is the] foundation of medical art".

In contrast to Freud, Groddeck interpreted all physiological symptoms as being psychological, caused by the It/Id/das Es, and sought to interpret them through psychoanalysis.

=== Psychology ===
Groddeck believed that all feelings are ambivalent, affection is always mixed with animosity

=== Religiosity ===
Groddeck was deeply interested in Christian mysticism. He regarded psychoanalysis as identical with Jesus' teachings. Groddeck analyzed Christian symbols with psychoanalytic methods.

Alan Watts described Groddeck, saying, "He was a completely wonderful man because everybody felt calmed by him. They felt an atmosphere of implicit faith in nature and especially in your own inner nature. No matter what, there is a wisdom inside you which may seem absurd, but you have to trust it."

== Later years ==
Toward the end of his life, many colleagues and admirers asked Groddeck to form a society that would promote his ideas. To this request, he would laugh and reply:

Disciples like their master to stay put, whereas I should think anyone a fool who wanted me to say the same thing tomorrow as I said yesterday. If you really want to be my follower, look at life for yourself and tell the world honestly what you see.

He died in Knonau near Zürich.

== See also ==
- Id, ego and super-ego
