= Positive mental attitude =

Importance of positive thinking as a contributing factor of success

Positive mental attitude (PMA) is a concept first introduced in 1937 by Napoleon Hill in the book Think and Grow Rich. The book never actually uses the term, but discusses the importance of positive thinking as a contributing factor of success. Napoleon, who along with W. Clement Stone, founder of Combined Insurance, later wrote Success Through a Positive Mental Attitude, defines positive mental attitude as comprising the 'plus' characteristics represented by words as faith, integrity, hope, optimism, courage, initiative, generosity, tolerance, tact, kindliness and good common sense.

Positive mental attitude is that philosophy which asserts that having an optimistic disposition in every situation in one's life attracts positive changes and increases achievement. Adherents employ a state of mind that continues to seek, find and execute ways to win, or find a desirable outcome, regardless of the circumstances. This concept is the opposite of negativity, defeatism and hopelessness. Optimism and hope are vital to the development of PMA.

== Psychology ==
PMA is under the umbrella of positive psychology. In positive psychology, high self-efficacy can help in gaining learned optimism which ultimately leads to PMA. PMA is considered an internal focus of control that influences external factors. Research has shown that through emotional intelligence training and positive psychology therapy, a person's attitudes and perceptions can be modified to improve one's personal and professional life.

== Sports ==
A study of Major League Baseball players indicated that a key component that separates major league players from the minor leagues and all other levels is their ability to develop mental characteristics and mental skills. Among them were mental toughness, confidence, maintaining a positive attitude, dealing with failure, expectations, and positive self-talk.

== Health ==
Well-meaning friends in the US and similar cultures routinely encourage people with Disease to maintain a positive attitude. However, although a positive attitude confers some immediate advantages and is more comfortable for other people, it does not result in a greater chance of cure or longer survival times.

A study done with HIV-positive individuals found that a high health self-efficacy, a task-oriented coping style, and a positive mental attitude were strong predictors for a health-promoting lifestyle which has a significant effect on overall health (coping and surviving).

== See also ==
- Autosuggestion – Psychological technique related to the placebo effect
- Creative thinking – Forming something new and somehow valuable
- Creative visualization – New Age practice
- Émile Coué – French psychologist (1857–1926)
- Hypnotic Ego-Strengthening Procedure – Hypnotherapeutic procedure
- Law of attraction – Pseudoscientific belief
- New Thought – 19th-century American spiritual movement
- Positive energy (China) – Chinese Communist Party slogan
- Self-fulfilling prophecy – Prediction that causes itself to become true
- Self-help – Self-guided improvement
- Toxic positivity – Construct in psychology
- Unconditional positive regard – Concept in psychotherapy
