= Carl R. Byoir =

Carl Byoir
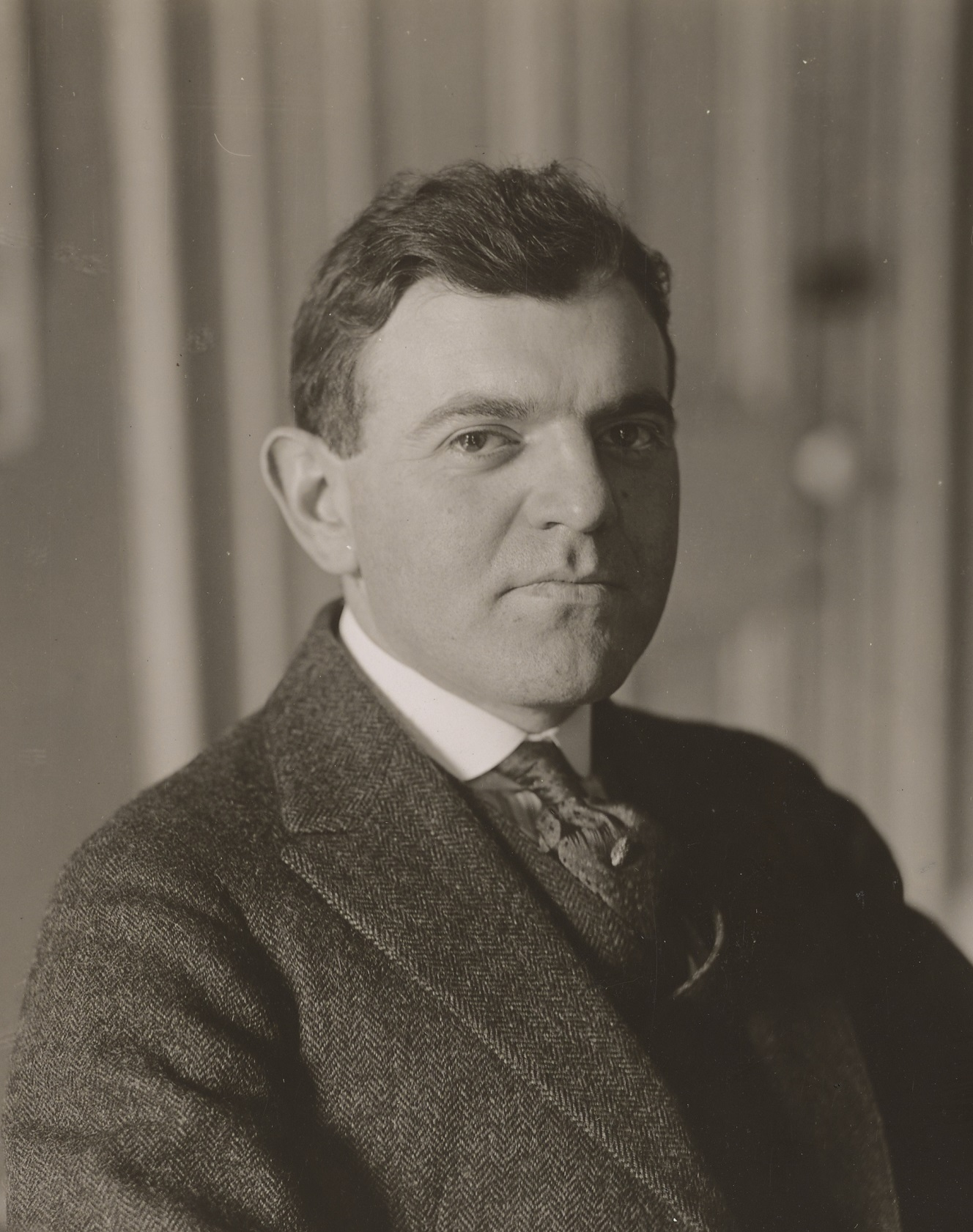
- Carl Byoir in May 1918
- Born: 1886
- Died: February 3, 1957 (aged 70–71)

Carl Robert Byoir (1886 — 3 February 1957) was an influential practitioner in the field of public relations. He created and organized one of the world's largest public relations firms in 1930.

== Early life ==
Byoir was born to Jewish immigrant parents from Poland but raised in Des Moines, Iowa. Byoir started his career in public relations at 14 as a reporter for The Des Moines Register. At the age of 17, Byoir became the editor of the Waterloo Times-Tribune. He worked his way through the University of Iowa while he was the circulation manager for Hearst Magazine's publications.

== Career ==
In 1917, Byoir became a member of the Committee on Public Information, which publicly organized the United States propaganda campaign for World War I.

In 1921, Byoir began working in the advertising and sales when E. Virgil Neal, at Nuxated Iron, hired Byoir as a salesman. At first, Byoir worked for Nuxated Iron without pay; however, within weeks, Byoir was hired as the vice-president and the general manager of the company because sales increased so significantly. He worked for Neal from 1921 to 1929.

In 1930, Byoir leased two Cuban newspapers, the Havana Post and the Havana Telegram. Byoir wanted to increase the circulation of the newspaper in Cuba by increasing the number of American tourists to Cuba. He became an influential intermediary for Americans wishing to invest in Cuba.

Carl Byoir and Associates were contracted by the German Railroads Information Bureau in 1933, ostensibly to send out information promoting Germany as tourist destination. After the Nation revealed that Carl Byoir was paid $6,000 per month to influence media and public perception of Nazi Germany, the Foreign Agents Registration Act of 1938 was passed in an effort to prevent propaganda by foreign governments.

Byoir continued to lead a few other public relations campaigns but his next notable campaign was with the Franklin D. Roosevelt administration planning many charity balls for the President and also for helping establish the March of Dimes foundation. Byoir's office was at 10 East 40th Street in New York, and from there he pursued his work in public relations, working with many other companies including the German Tourist Information Office, Freeport Sulphur Company, Crosley Motors, and Eastern Railroads.

One of his most noteworthy campaigns was conducted on behalf of The Great Atlantic and Pacific Tea Company (A&P), a grocery company that was the world's largest retailer by far. In 1937, A&P, which had never engaged in political matters before, hired Byoir to help it fight the powerful anti-chain-store movement, which sought to break up big chains to protect independent retailers and wholesalers. Working behind the scenes, Byoir organized a campaign to highlight the benefits of chains in reducing consumer prices. The campaign burst into public view on September 15, 1938, when 1,600 publications ran a full-page advertisement headlined "A Statement of Public Policy by the Great Atlantic & Pacific Tea Company." The advertisement criticized a bill introduced by U.S. Rep. Wright Patman of Texas to impose punitive taxes on chain stores. The bill was blocked, and the power of the anti-chain movement began to wane. Byoir remained an influential advisor to A&P for many years.

Byoir died in 1957. His company continued to grow before being acquired by Hill & Knowlton.

== See also ==
- CPI added December 29, 2012
