= Medicus curat, natura sanat =

Medical aphorism ("the physician treats, nature heals")

Medicus curat, natura sanat is an old aphorism in Latin which means that the physician treats while nature heals.

Variations in Latin include natura sanat, medicus curat morbus and there are equivalents in other languages such as Benjamin Franklin's sarcastic "God heals, and the Doctor takes the Fees" and Ambroise Paré's "Je le pansai, Dieu le guérit." The phrase was used in medieval times and the idea has been traced back to classical authors such as Galen and Aristotle.

Georg Groddeck made an acronym of the phrase which he used as the title of his 1913 book, Nasamecu.

== See also ==
- Nature cure (disambiguation)
- Nature therapy
- Naturopathy
- Vis medicatrix naturae
