= Georgetown, Missouri =

- Unincorporated community
- Nickname: Show-Me-Town
- Location within Missouri
- Coordinates: 38°45′31″N 93°14′17″W
- Country: United States
- State: Missouri
- County: Pettis
- Elevation: 830 ft (253 m)
- Time zone: UTC-6 (Central (CST))
  - Summer (DST): UTC-5 (CDT)
- GNIS feature ID: 0718403

Georgetown is an unincorporated community in Pettis County, Missouri, United States.

The community is located on Missouri Route H approximately one mile west of U.S. Route 65 and three miles north of Sedalia.

== History ==
Georgetown was platted in 1833, and named after Georgetown, Kentucky, the native home of an early settler. A post office called Georgetown was established in 1837, and remained in operation until 1921.
