= Émile Coué =

French psychologist (1857–1926)

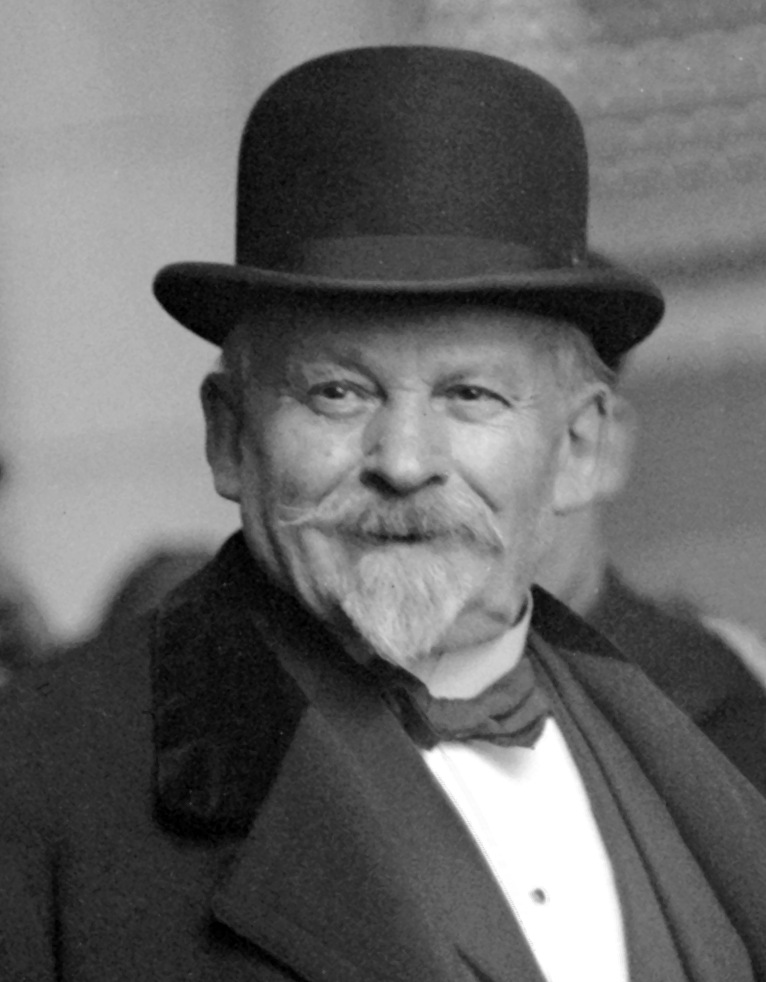
- Born: 26 February 1857; Troyes, Second French Empire
- Died: 2 July 1926 (aged 69); Nancy, France
- Occupations: Pharmacist; psychologist
- Spouse: Lucie Lemoine (1858–1954)

Émile Coué de la Châtaigneraie (French: [emil kue də la ʃɑtɛɲʁɛ]; 26 February 1857 – 2 July 1926) was a French psychologist, pharmacist, and hypnotist who introduced a popular method of psychotherapy and self-improvement based on optimistic autosuggestion.

It was in no small measure [Coué's] wholehearted devotion to a self-imposed task that enabled him, in less than a quarter of a century, to rise from obscurity to the position of the world’s most famous psychological exponent. Indeed, one might truly say that Coué sidetracked inefficient hypnotism [mistakenly based upon supposed operator dominance over a subject], and paved the way for the efficient, and truly scientific.

— Orton (1935).

Coué’s method was disarmingly non-complex—needing few instructions for on-going competence, based on rational principles, easily understood, demanding no intellectual sophistication, simply explained, simply taught, performed in private, using a subject's own resources, requiring no elaborate preparation, and no expenditure.

— Yeates (2016).

Most of us are so accustomed … to an elaborate medical ritual … in the treatment of our ills … [that] anything so simple as Coué's autosuggestion is inclined to arouse misgivings, antagonism and a feeling of scepticism.

— Duckworth (1922).

Coué's method was based upon the view that, operating deep below our conscious awareness, a complex arrangement of 'ideas' (especially when those ideas are dominant), continuously and spontaneously suggest things to us and significantly influence one's overall health and wellbeing.

We possess within us a force of incalculable power, which, when we handle it unconsciously is often prejudicial to us. If on the contrary we direct it in a conscious and wise manner, it gives us the mastery of ourselves and allows us not only to escape … from physical and mental ills, but also to live in relative happiness, whatever the conditions in which we may find ourselves.

— Coué, 1922b, p. 35.

As long as we look on autosuggestion as a remedy we miss its true significance. Primarily it is a means of self-culture, and one far more potent than any we have hitherto possessed. It enables us to develop the mental qualities we lack: efficiency, judgment, creative imagination, all that will help us to bring our life's enterprise to a successful end. Most of us are aware of thwarted abilities, powers undeveloped, impulses checked in their growth. These are present in our Unconscious like trees in a forest, which, overshadowed by their neighbours, are stunted for lack of air and sunshine. By means of autosuggestion we can supply them with the power needed for growth and bring them to fruition in our conscious lives. However old, however infirm, however selfish, weak or vicious we may be, autosuggestion will do something for us. It gives us a new means of culture and discipline by which the "accents immature", the "purposes unsure" can be nursed into strength, and the evil impulses attacked at the root. It is essentially an individual practice, an individual attitude of mind.

— Brooks, 1922

== Life and career ==
Coué's family, from the Brittany region of France and with origins in French nobility, had only modest means. A brilliant pupil in school, he initially intended to become an analytical chemist; however, because his father, who worked for the Eastern Railway Company, was in a precarious financial state, he eventually abandoned these studies. Coué then decided to become a pharmacist and graduated with a degree in pharmacology in 1876.

Working as an apothecary in Troyes from 1882 to 1910, Coué quickly discovered what later came to be known as the placebo effect. He became known for reassuring his clients by praising each remedy's efficacy and leaving a small positive notice with each given medication. In 1886 and 1887, he studied with Ambroise-Auguste Liébeault and Hippolyte Bernheim, two leading exponents of hypnotism, in Nancy.

In 1910, Coué sold his business and retired to Nancy, where he opened a clinic that continuously delivered some 40,000 treatment-units per annum (Baudouin, 1920, p. 14) to local, regional, and overseas patients over the next sixteen years. In 1913, Coué and his wife founded The Lorraine Society of Applied Psychology (French: La Société Lorraine de Psychologie appliquée). His book Self-Mastery Through Conscious Autosuggestion was published in England (1920), and in the United States (1922). Although Coué's teachings were, during his lifetime, more popular in Europe than in the United States, many Americans who adopted his ideas and methods, such as Elsie Lincoln Benedict, Maxwell Maltz, Napoleon Hill, Norman Vincent Peale, Robert H. Schuller, and W. Clement Stone, became famous in their own right by spreading his words.

Considered by Charles Baudouin to represent a second Nancy School, Coué treated many patients in groups and free of charge.

== The Coué Method: General ==
The Coué Method

Continuously, unjustly, and mistakenly trivialised as just a hand-clasp, some unwarranted optimism, and a 'mantra', Coué's method evolved over several decades of meticulous observation, theoretical speculation, in-the-field testing, incremental adjustment, and step-by-step transformation.
It tentatively began (c.1901) with very directive one-to-one hypnotic interventions, based upon the approaches and techniques that Coué had acquired from an American correspondence course.
As his theoretical knowledge, clinical experience, understanding of suggestion and autosuggestion, and hypnotic skills expanded, it gradually developed into its final subject-centred version—an intricate complex of (group) education, (group) hypnotherapy, (group) ego-strengthening, and (group) training in self-suggested pain control; and, following instruction in performing the prescribed self-administration ritual, the twice daily intentional and deliberate (individual) application of its unique formula, "Every day, in every way, I'm getting better and better."

— Yeates (2016c), p.55.

The application of his mantra-like conscious autosuggestion, "Every day, in every way, I'm getting better and better" (French: Tous les jours à tous points de vue je vais de mieux en mieux) is called Couéism or the Coué method. Some American newspapers quoted it differently, "Day by day, in every way, I'm getting better and better." The Coué method centered on a routine repetition of this particular expression according to a specified ritual—preferably as many as twenty times a day, and especially at the beginning and at the end of each day. When asked whether or not he thought of himself as a healer, Coué often stated that "I have never cured anyone in my life. All I do is show people how they can cure themselves." Unlike a commonly held belief that a strong conscious will constitutes the best path to success, Coué maintained that curing some of our troubles requires a change in our unconscious thought, which can be achieved only by using our imagination.

Although stressing that he was not primarily a healer but one who taught others to heal themselves, Coué claimed to have effected organic changes through autosuggestion.

Emile Coue audio
Mr Coue talking from 'Self Mastery recording and reciting in French:" Tous les jours, à tous points de vue, je vais de mieux en mieux."

=== Self-suggestion ===
Coué identified two types of self-suggestion: (i) the intentional, "reflective suggestion" made by deliberate and conscious effort, and (ii) the involuntary "spontaneous suggestion", that is a "natural phenomenon of our mental life … which takes place without conscious effort [and has its effect] with an intensity proportional to the keenness of [our] attention". Baudouin identified three different sources of spontaneous suggestion:

A. Instances belonging to the representative domain (sensations, mental images, dreams, visions, memories, opinions, and all intellectual phenomena);
B. Instances belonging to the affective domain (joy or sorrow, emotions, sentiments, tendencies, passions);
C. Instances belonging to the active or motor domain (actions, volitions, desires, gestures, movements at the periphery or in the interior of the body, functional or organic modifications).

=== Two minds ===
According to Yeates, Coué shared the theoretical position that Thomson Jay Hudson had expressed in his Law of Psychic Phenomena (1893): namely, that our "mental organization" was such that it seemed as if we had "two minds, each endowed with separate and distinct attributes and powers; [with] each capable, under certain conditions, of independent action".

Further, argued Hudson, it was entirely irrelevant, for explanatory purposes, whether we actually had "two distinct minds", whether we only seemed to be "endowed with a dual mental organization", or whether we actually had "one mind [possessed of] certain attributes and powers under some conditions, and certain other attributes and powers under other conditions".

== The Coué Method: Development and origins ==
Émile Coué (1857-1926)

Coué ... had been operating a free clinic at his home in Nancy, France, [since
1910] where he used the psychological technique of non-hypnotic suggestion as
group treatment, not only for the supposed mental and physical healing of his
patients, but also for enabling them to improve their character and to attain a
confident self mastery.
He argued that no suggestion made by himself became a reality unless it was
translated by his patients into their own autosuggestion.
Hence they really healed themselves, and could do this even without his
presence if they used the formula "Every day, in every way, I'm getting better
and better."
Rather than making any effort of the will about it, they were to employ this
suggestion while in a state of passive relaxation, such as upon awakening or
just before going to bed at night.
At these times, they rapidly and ritualistically repeated it twenty times,
counting with a string of twenty knots which they slipped through the fingers
one at a time.
Used in this manner, Coué argued, the idea of the formula would penetrate
the unconscious mind, where it would bring about the desired changes in body
or mind.
This would happen, he believed, because the unconscious governed all our
thoughts, behavior, and organic functions.
Indeed, it was so powerful that it controlled us like puppets, unless we in turn
learned how to control it through the self-administration of autosuggestions
which, once accepted by it, would be realized by means of its special powers.
While Coué did not denigrate the conscious self and reason, he certainly
diminished its role, likening it to a little island on the vast ocean of the
unconscious.
But despite such an emphasis on the unconscious, he avoided any mental
analysis of it, arguing that it was better not to know the nature of its contents.
Rapp (1987), pp.17-18.

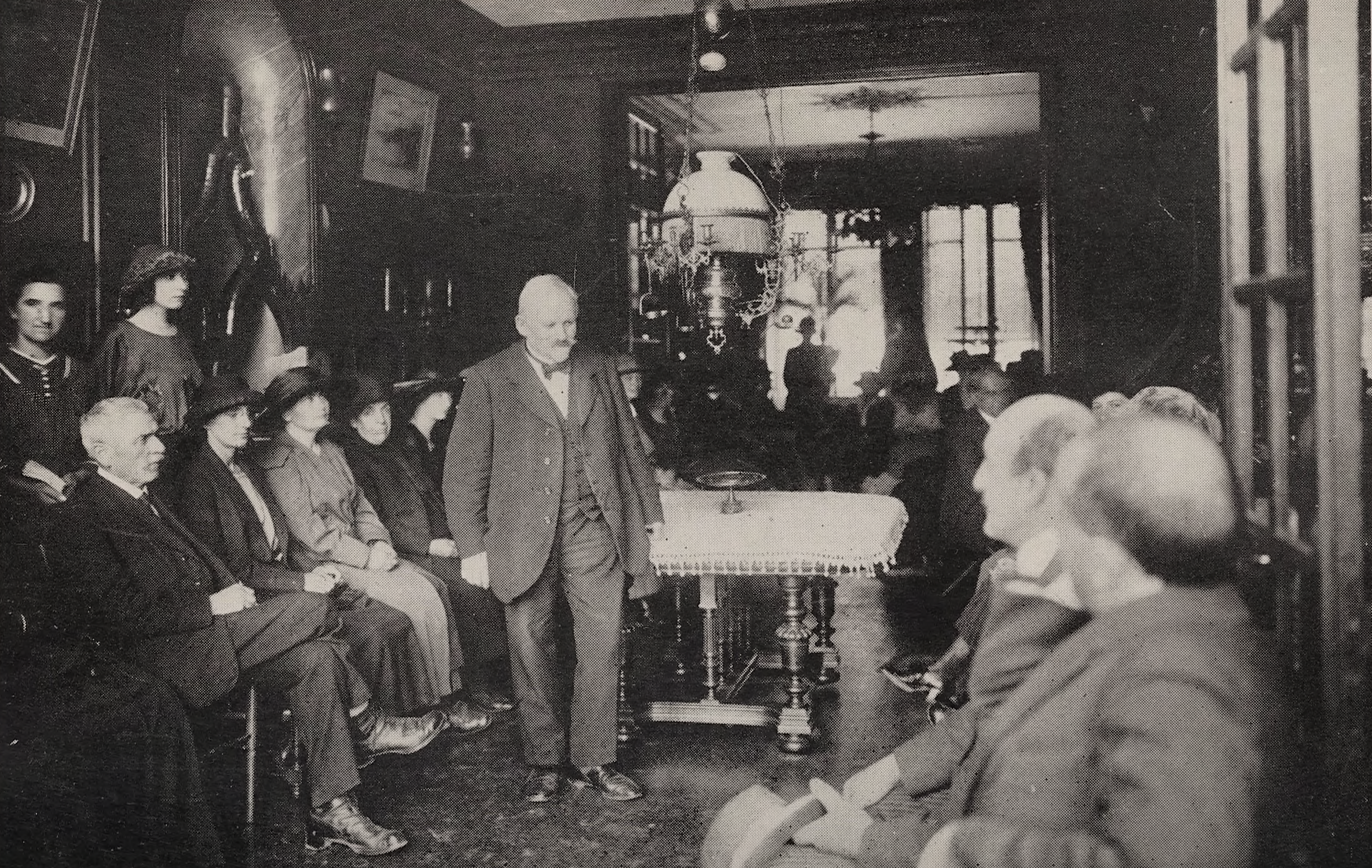
Emile Coué conducting a clinic in the parlour of his house at Nancy (1923).

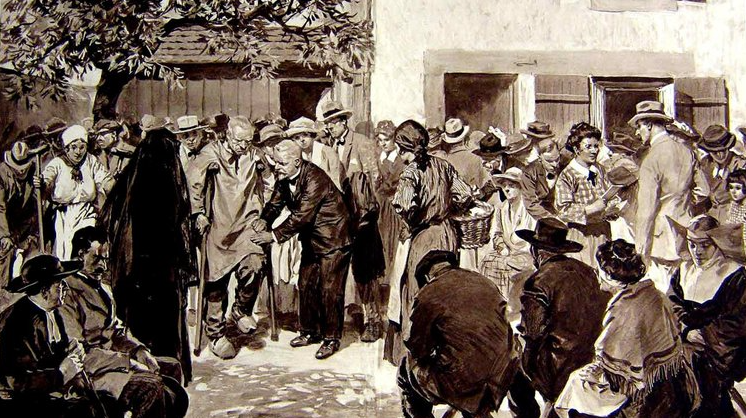
Stott, W.R.S. (1922), "The Apostle of Auto-Suggestion at Work in his Garden 'Clinic' at Nancy".

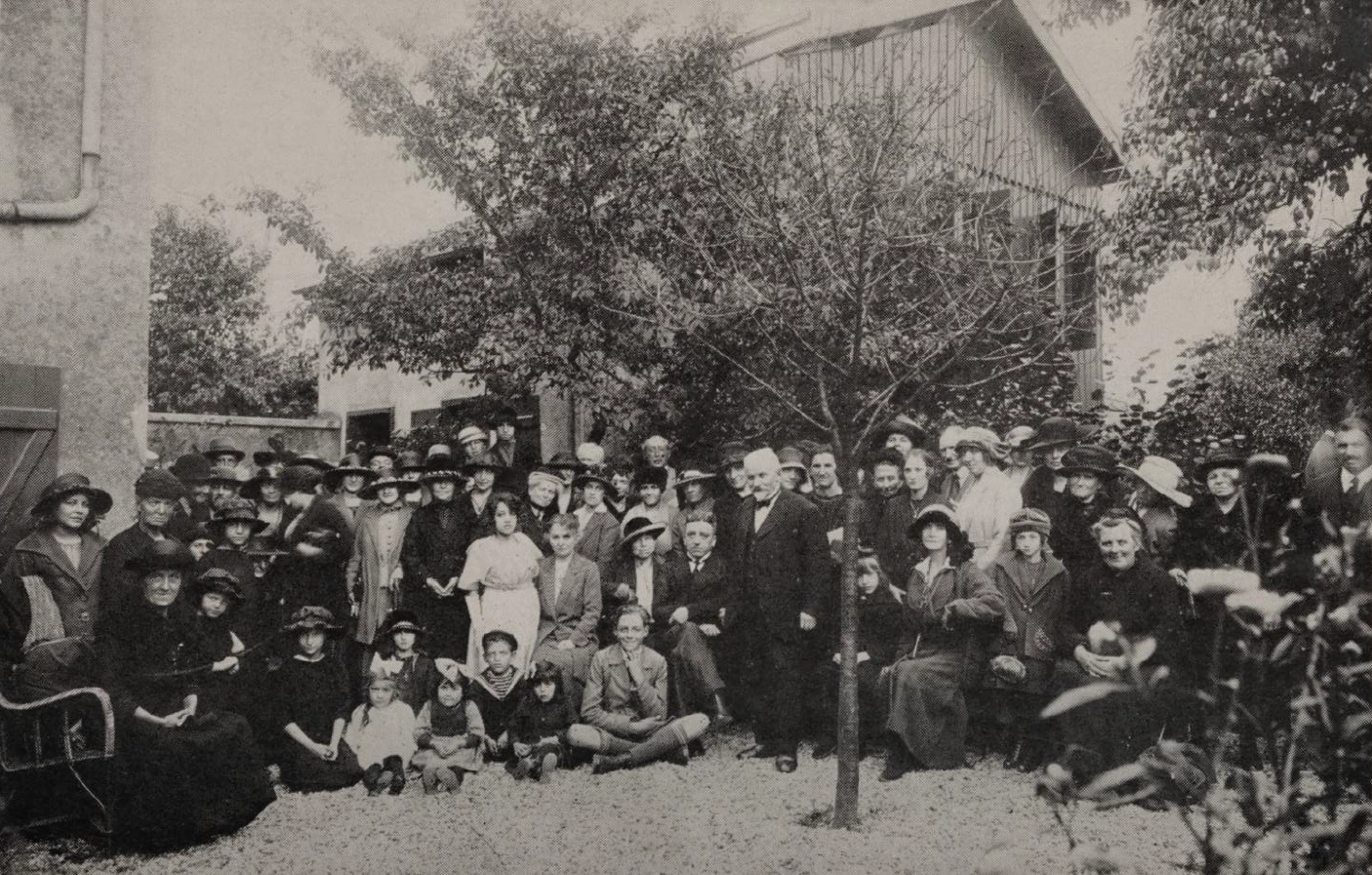
Émile Coué and his patients in his garden at Nancy (1923).

Coué noticed that in certain cases he could improve the efficacy of a given medicine by praising its effectiveness to the patient. He realized that those patients to whom he praised the medicine had a noticeable improvement when compared to patients to whom he said nothing. This began Coué's exploration of the use of hypnosis and the power of the imagination.

Coué's initial method for treating patients relied on hypnosis. He discovered that subjects could not be hypnotized against their will and, more importantly, that the effects of hypnosis waned when the subjects regained consciousness. He thus eventually turned to autosuggestion, which he describes as

... an instrument that we possess at birth, and with which we play unconsciously all our life, as a baby plays with its rattle. It is however a dangerous instrument; it can wound or even kill you if you handle it imprudently and unconsciously. It can on the contrary save your life when you know how to employ it consciously.

Coué believed in the effects of medication. But he also believed that our mental state is able to affect and even amplify the action of these medications. Coué recommended that patients take medicines with the confidence that they would be completely cured very soon, and healing would be optimal. Conversely, he contended, patients who are skeptical of a medicine would find it least effective. By consciously using autosuggestion, he observed that his patients could cure themselves more efficiently by replacing their "thought of illness" with a new "thought of cure". According to Coué, repeating words or images enough times causes the subconscious to absorb them. The cures were the result of using imagination or "positive autosuggestion" to the exclusion of one's own willpower.

== The Coué Method: Underlying principles ==
Coué thus developed a method which relied on the principle that any idea exclusively occupying the mind turns into reality, although only to the extent that the idea is within the realm of possibility. For instance, a person without hands will not be able to make them grow back. However, if a person firmly believes that his or her asthma is disappearing, then this may actually happen, as far as the body is actually able physically to overcome or control the illness. On the other hand, thinking negatively about the illness (e.g., "I am not feeling well") will encourage both mind and body to accept this thought. Likewise, when someone cannot remember a name, they probably will be unable to recall it as long as they hold onto this idea (e.g., "I can't remember") in their mind. Coué realised that it is better to focus on and imagine the desired, positive results (e.g., "I feel healthy and energetic," and "I can remember clearly").

=== Willpower ===
Coué observed that the main obstacle to autosuggestion was willpower. For the method to work, the patient must refrain from making any independent judgment, meaning that he must not let his will impose its own views on positive ideas. Everything must thus be done to ensure that the positive "autosuggestive" idea is consciously accepted by the patient; otherwise, one may end up getting the opposite effect of what is desired.

For example, when a student has forgotten an answer to a question in an exam, he likely will think something such as, "I have forgotten the answer". The more he tries to think of it, the more the answer becomes blurred and obscured. However, if this negative thought is replaced with a positive one ("No need to worry - it will come back to me"), the chances that the student will remember the answer will increase.

Coué noted that young children always applied his method perfectly, as they lacked the willpower that remained present among adults. When he instructed a child by saying, "Clasp your hands, and you can't open them," the child thus would immediately follow.

=== Self-conflict ===
A patient's problems are likely to increase when his willpower and imagination (or mental ideas) are opposing each other, something Coué would refer to as "self-conflict". In the student's case, the will to succeed clearly is incompatible with his thought of being incapable of remembering his answers. As the conflict intensifies, so does the problem: the more the patient tries to sleep, the more he becomes awake. The more a patient tries to stop smoking, the more he smokes. The patient must thus abandon his willpower and instead put more focus on his imaginative power in order to succeed fully with his cure.

== The Coué Method: Efficacy ==
The popularity of his method, which Coué once called his "trick", drew patients of all sorts to seek out his services. The list of ailments included kidney problems, diabetes, memory loss, stammering, weakness, atrophy, and all sorts of physical and mental illnesses. According to one of his journal entries (1916), he apparently cured a patient of a uterus prolapse as well as "violent pains in the head" (migraine).

C. (Cyrus) Harry Brooks (1890–1951), author of various books on Coué, claimed the success rate of his method was around 93%. The remaining 7% of people would include those who were too skeptical of Coué's approach and those who refused to recognize it. Coue himself claims that the success rate of his method is 98%, save for those of very low intelligence preventing them from understanding instructions and those with low powers of attention.

== Criticism ==
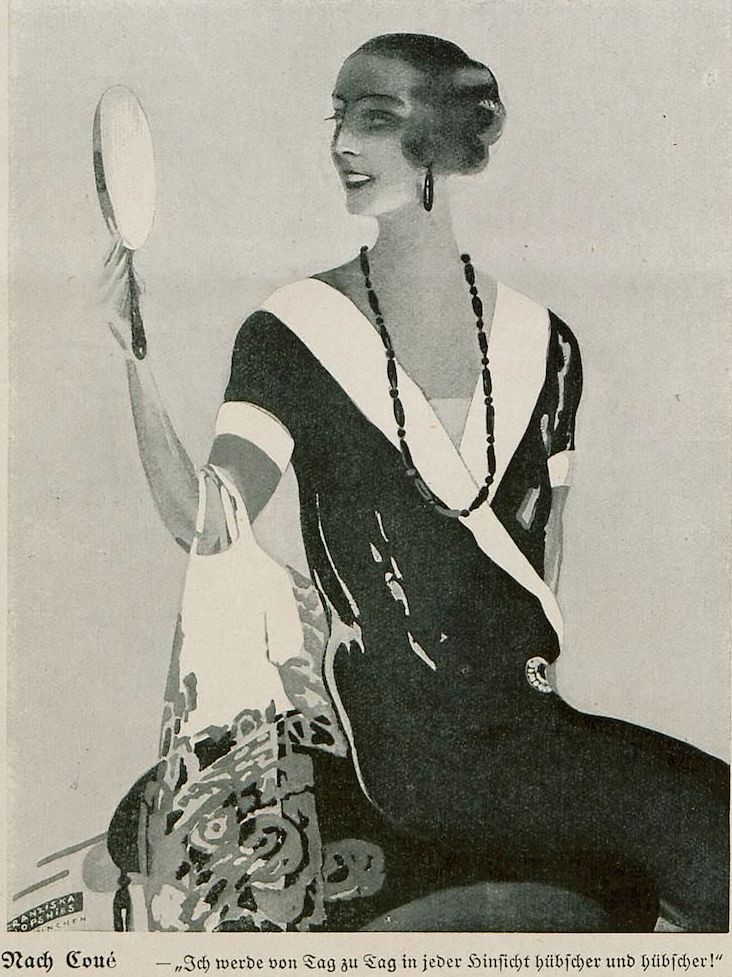
Nach Coué — "Ich werde von Tag zu Tag in jeder hinsicht hübscher und hübscher." (Franziska Schlopsnies, 1922).

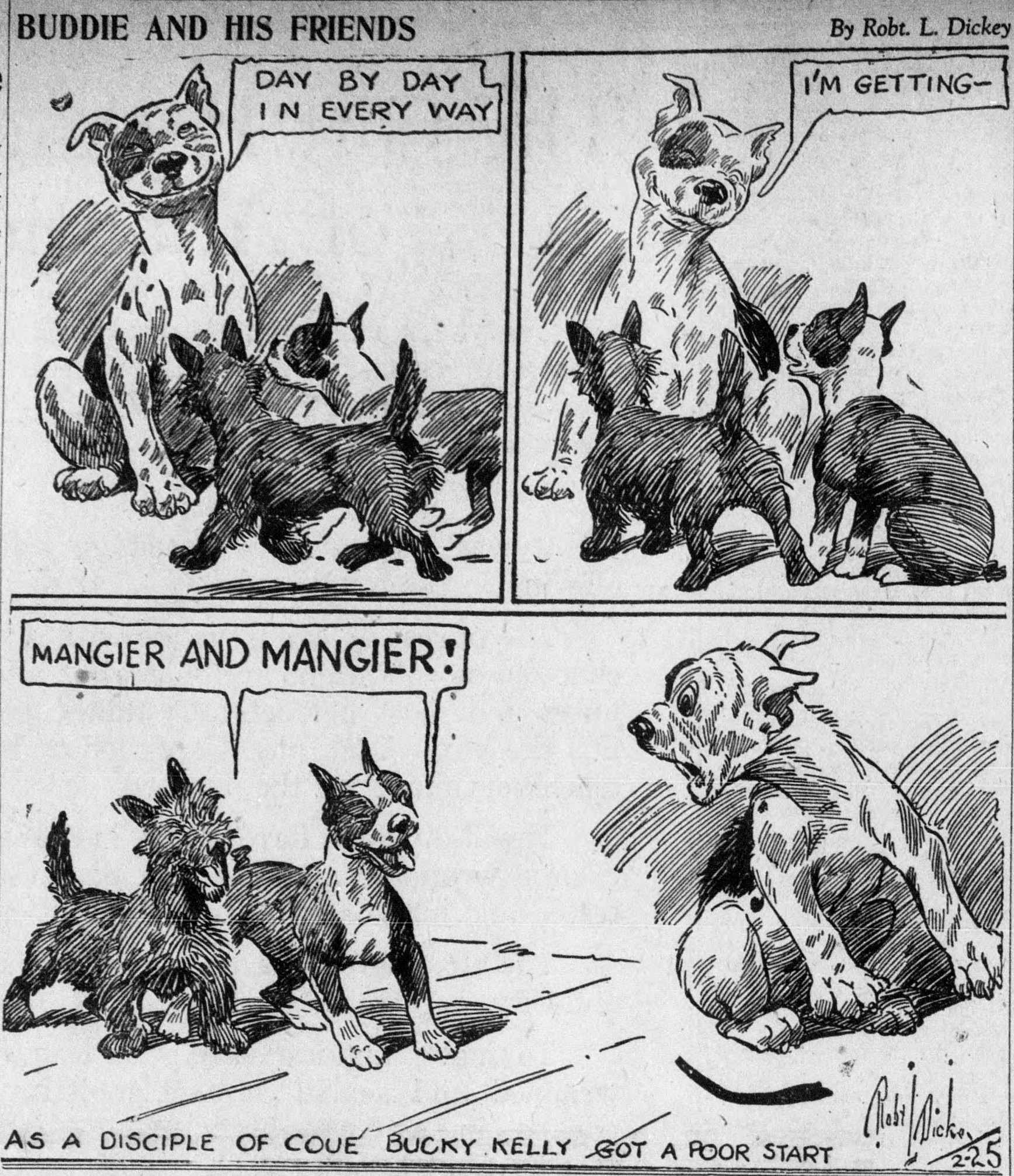
1923 comic strip mocking Coué

"That Coué's formula could be applied with a minimum of instruction was challenging; and the accounts of Coué's method curing organic disease were just as threatening to the conventional medicine of the day, as they were inspiring to Coué's devotees."

Some critics, such as Barrucand and Paille (1986), argue that the astonishing results widely attributed to Coué were due to his charisma, rather than his method. In contrast, Barcs-Masson (1962, p. 368), observes that Coué was the complete opposite of Jules Romains' character, Dr. Knock — "whose exceptional commercial success came from his ability to convince healthy individuals that they had a heretofore-unrecognised ailment" — and rather than, as Knock did, find unrecognized disease within the healthy, Coué activated dormant health within the ailing.

Although Coué never produced any empirical evidence for the efficacy of his formula (and, therefore, his claims have not been scientifically evaluated), three subsequent experimental studies, conducted more than half a century later, by Paulhus (1993), "seem to offer some unexpected support for Coué's claims".

=== The psycho-medical establishment ===
According to Yeates (2016a, p. 19), the protests routinely made by those within the psychomedical establishment (e.g., Moxon, 1923; Abraham, 1926) were on one or more of the following grounds:

(1) "Healing of organic disease by 'self-mastery' was impossible! Aside from 'spontaneous remissions' of authentic disease (efficacious vis medicatrix naturæ!), reported 'cures' were either due to mistaken diagnosis (it was never that disease!), or mistaken prognosis (it was always going to get better!). Anyway, even if it had been diagnosed correctly, there was no compelling evidence to suggest that Coué's approach had been in any way responsible for the cure."
(2) "Even if it was true that, in some extraordinary circumstances, healing by 'self-mastery' was possible, Coué's failure to immediately eliminate those with counterproductive limitations — such as, for example, those lacking the required dedication, mind-set, talent, diligence, persistence, patience, etc. — resulted in many (clearly unsuited) individuals mistakenly postponing (otherwise) life-saving operations and delaying (otherwise) radical medical treatment far beyond any prospect of recovery or cure."
(3) "Despite the obvious fact that each 'disease' had a unique cause, a unique history, and a unique (and idiosyncratic) personal impact, Coué treated a wide range of disparate individuals in the same, single group session, in the same way; and, moreover, he treated them without any sort of detailed examination or differential diagnosis."
(4) "The method's central 'magical incantation' — a specific formula, uttered a specific number of times, in a special way, using a knotted string — aroused strong opposition, as it reeked of outmoded superstitious practices and beliefs."

=== The press ===
While most American reporters of his day seemed dazzled by Coué's accomplishments, and did not question the results attributed to his method, a handful of journalists and a few educators were skeptical. After Coué had left Boston, the Boston Herald waited six months, revisited the patients he had "cured", and found most had initially felt better but soon returned to whatever ailments they previously had. Few of the patients would criticize Coué, saying he did seem very sincere in what he tried to do, but the Herald reporter concluded that any benefit from Coué's method seemed to be temporary and might be explained by being caught up in the moment during one of Coué's events. Whilst a number of academic psychologists looked upon his work favourably, others did not. Coué was also criticized by exponents of psychoanalysis, with Otto Fenichel concluding: "A climax of dependence masked as independent power is achieved by the methods of autosuggestion where a weak and passive ego is controlled by an immense superego with magical powers. This power is, however, borrowed and even usurped".

== Memorials ==
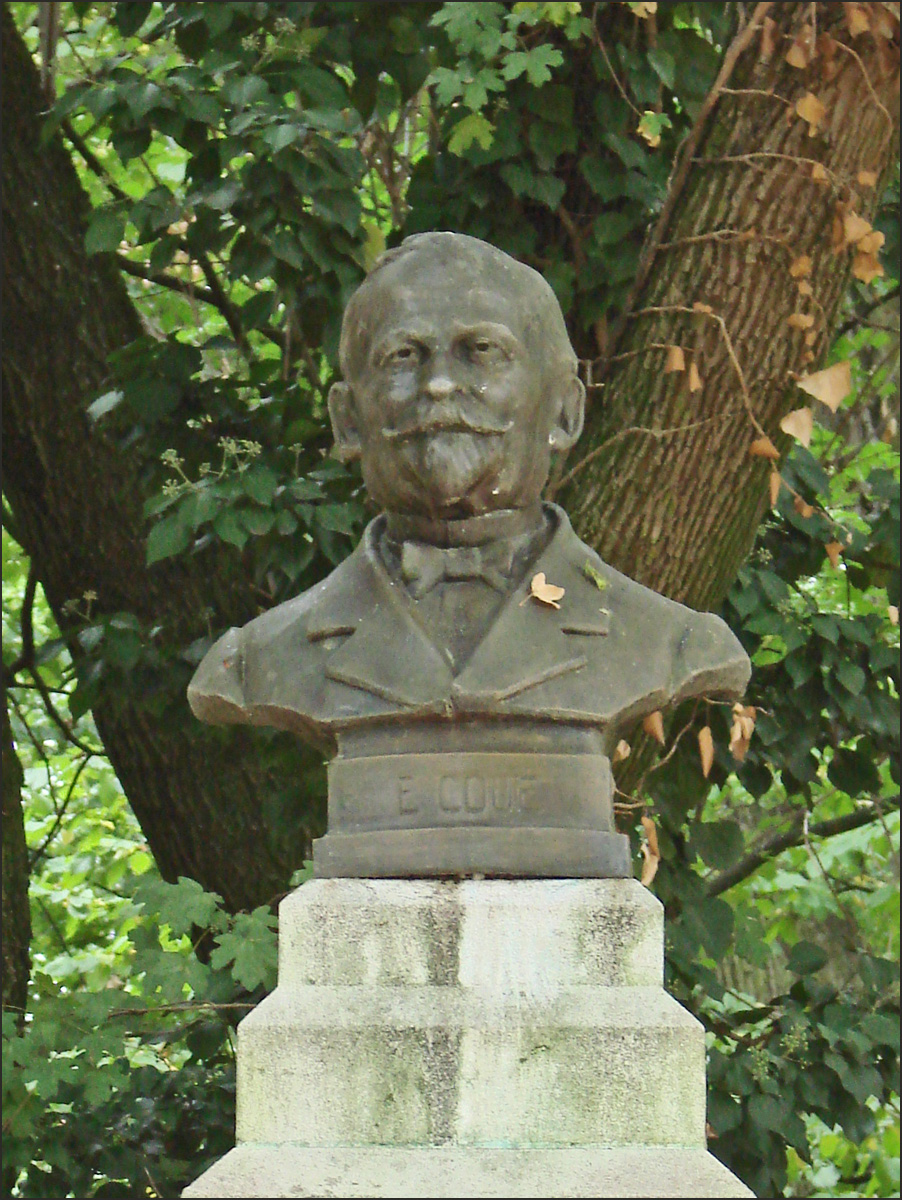
Memorial bust of Coué (detail), St Mary's Park, Nancy.

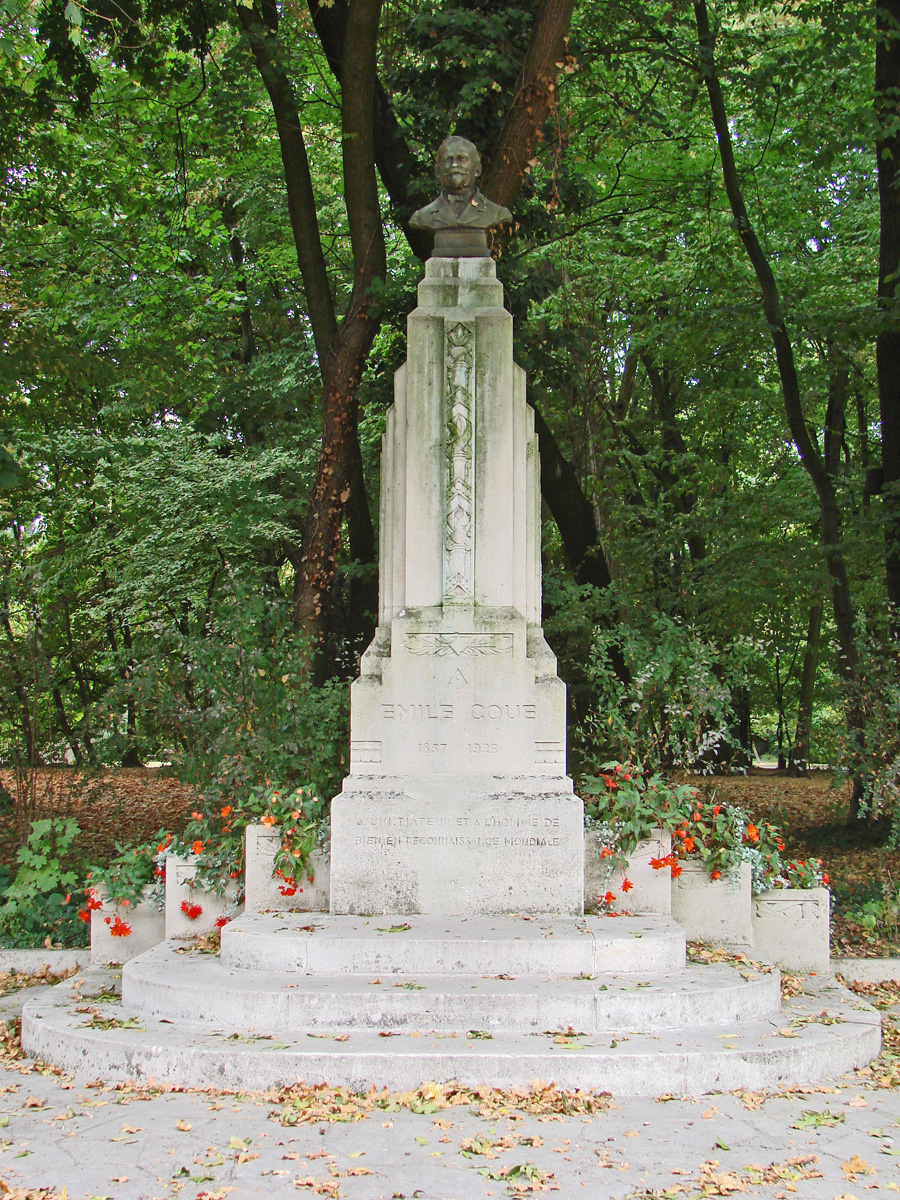
Monument to Coué, St Mary's Park, Nancy.

On 28 June 1936, a monument erected to the memory of Coué, funded by worldwide subscription, and featuring a bust of Coué created by French sculptor Eugène Gatelet, was dedicated in St Mary's Park, in Nancy. The bust was stored for safe-keeping during World War II and, postwar, in 1947, was restored to its former position through the efforts of Armand Lebrun, the director of the Institut Coué in Brussels from 1923.

== References in fiction ==
- 1922: In the same year as the English translation of Self-Mastery Through Conscious Autosuggestion is published, the song I'm Getting Better Every Day (words by Percy Edgar, music by Mark Strong) is released.
- 1923: A Swedish translation of Strong's "I'm Getting Better Every Day" is released by entertainer Ernst Rolf, Bättre och bättre dag för dag (Better and better day by day). It is still a popular refrain in Sweden almost a century later.
- 1923: The Coué Method is taught in Elsie Lincoln Benedict's How to Get Anything You Want to train the subconscious mind.
- 1924: In the Broadway musical "Sitting Pretty" (music by Jerome Kern), in the song "Tulip Time in Sing-Sing", P. G. Wodehouse's lyrics include "I'd sit discussing Coué With my old pal Bat-eared Louie".
- 1926: The Coué Method is mentioned in P. G. Wodehouse's short story, "Mr. Potter Takes a Rest Cure".
- 1928: Coué and Couéism are referred to frequently in John Galsworthy's novel The White Monkey from his Modern Comedy trilogy. Fleur Mont (née Forsyte), expecting what her husband (the tenth baronet) keeps referring to as the eleventh, repeats daily "every day in every way my baby's becoming more and more male". Other characters in the novel are also Coué followers, including, rather improbably, the strait-laced and sensible Soames (although he remains sceptical).
- 1930: Miss Milsome, in The Documents in the Case, written by Dorothy L. Sayers and Robert Eustace, dabbles in all sorts of self-improvement schemes, including using "In every day ..."
- 1934: in Louis-Ferdinand Céline's novel Journey to the End of the Night The protagonist Bardamu thinks "In her despair I sniffed vestiges of the Coue method".
- 1946: In Josephine Tey's novel Miss Pym Disposes, the title character, herself a psychologist, refers to Coué with apparent scepticism.
- 1948: In Graham Greene's novel, The Heart of the Matter, the narrator dismisses the Indian fortune teller's reading of Inspector Wilson's hand: "Of course the whole thing was Couéism: if one believed in it enough, it would come true."
- 1969: In the film The Bed Sitting Room Room (1969), the character "Mate", played by Spike Milligan, repeatedly utters the phrase "Every day, in every way, I'm getting better and better" while delivering a pie.
- 1970: Brief mention in Robertson Davies' book Fifth Business; the passage ends with a criticism of Couéism:

"So Dr. Coué failed for her, as he did for many others, for which I lay no blame on him. His system was really a form of secularized, self-seeking prayer, without the human dignity that even the most modest prayer evokes. And like all attempts to command success for the chronically unsuccessful, it petered out."

- 1973: The leading character, Frank Spencer (played by Michael Crawford), in the BBC's situation comedy Some Mothers Do 'Ave 'Em, often recites the mantra, on occasion when trying to impress the instructor during a public relations training course.
- 1976: In the film The Pink Panther Strikes Again, the mentally-ill Chief Inspector Charles Dreyfus, repeatedly uses the phrase "Every day and in every way, I am getting better, and better" as directed by his psychiatrist.
- 1980: The chorus in the song "Beautiful Boy" — which John Lennon wrote for his son, Sean — makes a reference to Coué's mantra:

Before you go to sleep
Say a little prayer
Every day in every way
It's getting better and better.

- 1981: The protagonist in Emir Kusturica's 1981 film Do You Remember Dolly Bell? often recites the mantra as a result of studying hypnotherapy and autosuggestion.
- 1992: In Kerry Greenwood's novel, Death at Victoria Dock, investigative detective Phryne Fisher recites the mantra during a particularly trying case.
- 1994: In the film Barcelona, Fred Boynton, making light of his cousin Ted's commitment to various business-efficiency techniques, recites the mantra. Ted quickly dismisses Fred's quote stating that Coué and autosuggestion is today considered "unserious".
- 1998: In Nest Family Entertainment's animated children's film The Swan Princess III and the Mystery of the Enchanted Treasure, a character uses the mantra while training for a competition.
- 2005: In the HBO drama Six Feet Under (Season 5, episode 4), George Sibley repeats the mantra to Billy Chenowith in discussing the effectiveness of the former's treatment.
- 2012: In Boardwalk Empire (season 3, episode 1) the fugitive Nelson Van Alden (played by Michael Shannon), now a salesman, looks into a mirror and repeats to himself the mantra: "Every day, in every way, I am getting better and better".

== See also ==
- Autosuggestion – Psychological technique related to the placebo effect
- Charles Baudouin – French psychoanalyst and pacifist
- James Braid – Scottish surgeon (1795–1860), pioneer of hypnotism
- German occupation of north-east France during World War I – Occupation of French territory by Germany between 1914 and 1918
- Hypnotic Ego-Strengthening Procedure – Hypnotherapeutic procedure
- Emmanuel Movement – Psychotherapy approach, 1906–1931
- Ambroise-Auguste Liébeault – French physician and founding member of the Nancy School of Hypnosis
- New Thought – 19th-century American spiritual movement
- Positive mental attitude – Importance of positive thinking as a contributing factor of success
- Johannes Schultz – German psychiatrist (1884–1970)
- Suggestibility – Inclination to accept the suggestions of others
- Suggestion – Psychological process of guiding a person
- The Nancy School of Hypnosis – French school of psychotherapy from 1866
- The Salpêtrière School of Hypnosis – French school of psychotherapy from 1882
