= Charles Baudouin =

French psychoanalyst and pacifist

Charles Baudouin (French: [bodwɛ̃]; 26 July 1893 – August 25, 1963) was a French psychoanalyst and pacifist. His psychoanalytical work combined Freudianism with elements of the thought of Carl Jung and Alfred Adler.

== Biography ==
Baudouin was born in Nancy, France. After studying literature, Charles Baudouin continued his education in philosophy at the Sorbonne, where he became interested by the personalities of Pierre Janet and Henri Bergson. In 1913, as a young graduate in philosophy, Baudouin was interested by the work of Emile Coué and contributed to making him famous.

In 1915, Pierre Bovet and Edouard Claparède invited him to participate in the work of the Institute Jean-Jacques Rousseau, the future faculty of psychology of the University of Geneva, where he was appointed as a professor. Switzerland also allowed him to get closer to Romain Rolland.

Baudouin had his first analysis with Dr. Carl Picht, a Jungian. After meeting with Sigmund Freud in Vienna in 1926, he began a second "didactic" analysis, from 1926 to 1928, with Dr. Charles Odier, a Freudian of the time. A few years later, he followed up with a new analytical experience with Tina Keller.

He did not neglect the historical foundations of psychoanalysis, particularly suggestion and hypnosis.

This experience and all his therapeutic practice, including the therapy of children and education led him to express the respective contributions of Freud and Jung with his own findings. "Freud or Jung's alternatives must be overcome, we must be in favor of psychoanalysis," he said and added, "It's like asking you: Are you for Newton or Einstein? To which there is only one answer: I am for physics".

He brought to psychoanalytic structure his personal contribution, reaching the conclusion of "De l'instinct à l'esprit." He also wrote the interesting term "Psychagogy" .

In 1924 he founded the International Institute of Psychagogy and Psychotherapy under the patronage of Adler, Allendy, Bachelard, Coue, Flournoy, Freud, Hesnard, Janet, Jung, Laforgue, etc. Later the institute was renamed as the International Institute for Psychoanalysis and Psychotherapy Charles Baudouin, headquartered in Geneva.

He published a pacifist journal, Le Carmel, published various articles mainly from 1933 to 1935 and, alternately, as of 1917 a monthly magazine Les Cahiers du Carmel. When these journals ceased publication, Baudouin replaced them with the Bulletin trimestriel de l'Institut international de psychagogie, which became in 1931 the Action et Pensée magazine. This is still published twice a year.

In the late 1920s and early 1930s, Baudouin taught French literature and philosophy at the International School of Geneva (the world's first international school, founded in 1924) .

Baudouin died, aged 70, in Geneva.

== International Institute for Psychoanalysis and Psychotherapy Charles Baudouin ==
The institute was officially founded in Geneva in 1924 by Charles Baudouin as the "Institute of Psychagogy and Psychotherapy". Its patronage committee over time included, Adler, Allendy, Bachelard Besse, Coué, Driesch, Durand, Eliade, Flournoy, Flugel, Freud, Guitton, Hesnard, Huyghe, Janet, Jung, Laforgue, Maeder and Meng. The first directors were Baudouin, Bovet and Claparède.

It is the oldest French institute of psychoanalysis.

The institute today has over a hundred practitioners in Europe and is represented in four countries: Belgium, France, Italy and Switzerland. It pursues a constant research on the theoretical and practical side, organizes conferences, seminars and symposiums open to the public and is always eager to train new members in the spirit of openness, which characterized its practice.

== Theoretical concepts of the founders ==
Baudouin supports his methodology on three levels (the Psychagogy), depending on the degree of contribution of the unconscious. It therefore has three kinds of methods used separately, sequentially or simultaneously as appropriate:

=== From the Conscious to the Conscious: "The educational methods" ===
- Work on the thought, the will, the action,
- Methods close to Psychotherapy of support and cognitive-behavioral.

=== From the Conscious to the Unconscious: "The suggestive methods" ===
- Effect of a spontaneous suggestion, or induced by a hypnotic process.

=== From the Unconscious to the Unconscious "The psychoanalytic methods" ===
Baudouin based the psychoanalytic synthesis primarily on Freudian, Jungian and Adlerian based concepts, plus his own, clearing the vibrant and dynamic complementarity. Baudouin brings together in one representation the scheme of "the seven partners of the Ego", including:

- Three Freudian instances, Es, Ego and Super-ego,
- Three Jungian instances, Persona, Shadow and Self,
- One Baudouinienne instance, the Automatism.

Of their oppositions, agreements or complementarity, the always shifting balance of the psychic system will depend.

== Works ==
Through his numerous books and conferences, Baudouin promoted psychoanalysis not only in French-speaking countries but around the world. He is a precursor in a number of fields (art, education, suggestion, and hypnosis) and some books have been translated in German, English, Spanish, Italian, Norwegian and Swedish. A valuable collection of his essays, Contemporary Studies (1925) includes "The Linguistic International (Esperanto)." His speech in Esperanto given during the 'somera universitato' as part of an international Esperanto Congress in Geneva (1925), was published under the title La arto de memdisciplino.

=== Some books in English ===
- Suggestion and autosuggestion : a psychological and pedagogical study based upon the investigations made by the new Nancy school. Translated by Eden and Cedar Paul, 1920.
- Tolstoi: The Teacher. Translated by Cedar Paul, 1921.
- Studies in Psychoanalysis, An Account of Twenty-Seven Concrete Cases Preceded by a Theoretical Exposition. Translated by Eden and Cedar Paul, 1922.
- The power within us. Translated by Eden and Cedar Paul, 1923.
- The Birth Of Psyche. Translated by Fred Rothwell, 1923.
- Contemporary studies. Translated by Eden and Cedar Paul, 1924.
- Psychoanalysis and aesthetics. Translated by Eden and Cedar Paul, 1924.
- The Inner Life and Individualism. Translated by Cedar Paul, 1924.
- The Mind of the Child A Psychoanalytical Study. Translated by Eden and Cedar Paul, 1933.
- The Myth of Modernity. Translated by Bernard Miall, 1950.

=== Psychoanalytical books in French ===
- Suggestion et autosuggestion, Neuchâtel-Paris, Delachaux&Niestlé, 1919, 1922, 1938 et 1951.
- Études de psychanalyse, Neuchâtel-Paris, Delachaux&Niestlé, 1922.
- La Force en nous, Nancy-Genève, Ed. de la Société lorraine de Psychologie Appliqué – Ed. du Carmel, 1923, 1950.
- Psychologie de la suggestion et autosuggestion, Neuchâtel-Paris, Delachaux&Niestlé, 1924.
- Qu'est-ce que la suggestion ?, Neuchâtel-Paris, Delachaux&Niestlé, 1924. Paris, Ed. Le Hameau, 1982.
- Psychanalyse de l'art, Paris, Alcan, 1929.
- Mobilisation de l'énergie. Éléments de psychagogie théorique et pratique, Ed. Pelman, Paris, 1931.
- L'Âme enfantine et la psychanalyse, Neuchâtel-Paris, Delachaux&Niestlé, 1931. Deuxième édition augmentée 1951, 1964.
- La psychanalyse, Paris, Hermann, 1939.
- Découverte de la Personne. Esquisse d'un personnalisme analytique, Paris, Alcan, 1940.
- L'Âme et l'action. Prémisses d'une philosophie de la psychanalyse, Genève, Mont-Blanc, 1944, 1969. Paris, Ed. Imago, 2006. (Prix Amiel)
- Introduction à l'analyse des rêves, Genève, Mont-Blanc, 1942. Ed. l'Arche, 1950.
- De l'instinct à l'esprit, Paris, Desclée de Brouwer, 1950. Neuchâtel-Paris, Delachaux&Niestlé, 1970. Paris, Ed. Imago, 2007.
- Y a-t-il une science de l'âme ?, Paris, Fayard, 1957.
- Psychanalyse du symbole religieux, Paris, Fayard, 1961. Paris, Ed. Imago, 2006.
- L'œuvre de Jung et la psychologie complexe, Paris, Payot, 1963.
- Christophe le Passeur, Paris, La Colombe, 1964. Paris, Le courrier du livre, 1984.

=== Other books in French ===
- Culture de la force morale, Société lorraine de psychologie appliquée, 1917.
- Romain Rolland calomnié, Genève, Le Carmel, 1918.
- Tolstoi éducateur, Neuchâtel-Paris, Delachaux&Niestlé, 1921.
- Le Symbole chez Verhaeren, Genève, Ed. Mongenet, 1924.
- La Discipline intérieure, (avec Dr Laestchinski) Genève, Forum, 1924.
- Émile Coué, Lausanne, La Concorde, 1927.
- Carl Spitteler, Bruxelles, Les Cahiers du journal de poètes, 1938.
- Jean-Louis Claparède, Neuchâtel-Paris, Delachaux&Niestlé, 1939.
- Douceur de France, Lausanne, L'Abbaye du Livre, 1941.
- Tenir, Causeries sur le courage quotidien, Neuchâtel-Paris, Delachaux&Niestlé, 1942.
- James Vibert, La Chaux-de-Fonds, Nouveaux Cahiers, 1943.
- Psychanalyse de Victor Hugo, Genève, Éditions du Mont-Blanc, 1943. Paris, Armand Colin, 1972. Paris, Ed. Imago, 2008.
- Éclaircie sur l'Europe, Lausanne, L'Abbaye du Livre, 1944.
- Hommage à Romain Rolland, Genève, Mont-Blanc, 1945.
- René Allendy. 1889-1942, Genève, Mont-Blanc, 1945.
- Le Mythe du moderne, Genève, Mont-Blanc, 1946.
- Reconnaissances lorraines, Genève, Mont-Blanc, 1946.
- Alexandre Mairet, Genève, Cahiers du Carmel, 1947.
- Le Triomphe du héros, Paris, Plon, 1950.
- Blaise Pascal ou l'ordre du cœur, Paris, Plon, 1962.
- Jean Racine, l'enfant du désert, Paris, Plon, 1963.

=== Novels in French ===
- La Loge de la rue du vieux muy, Paris, Grasset, 1928.
- Générations, Paris, Grasset, 1928.
- Printemps anxieux, Paris, Grasset, 1929.
- L'Éveil de Psyché, 1928, Paris, Psyché, 1947.

=== Poetry in French ===
- En sourdine, Paris, Paris-Revue, 1915.
- Éclats d'obus, Genève-Paris, Cahiers du Carmel, 1917.
- L'Arche flottante, Genève, Le Carmel, 1919.
- Baptismales, Genève, Le Carmel, 1919.
- Ecce Homo, Genève, Le Carmel, 1921.
- Le miracle de vivre, Anvers, Ed. Lumière, 1922.
- La jeunesse éternelle, Paris, Images de Paris, 1924.
- Le feu de hommes, Paris, Images de Paris, 1926.
- Cimes, Paris, La Jeune Parque, 1930.
- Stigmates, Genève, Le livre de dix, 1940.
- Le voile de la danse, Vésenaz, P. Cailler, 1945.
- Rose des ruines, Genève, Cahier du Carmel, 1945.
- Livres d'images, Lyon, Henneuse, 1953.
- Il libro delle ore, Siena, Casa Editrice Maia, 1959.
- Paroles sur des vieux airs, Genève, Éditions Perret-Gentil, 1960.
- Deux rondeaux pour chant et piano, Genève, 1960.
- Trois rondels pour quatre voix mixte, Genève, 1960.
- Florilège poétique, Blainville-sur-Mer, L'amitié par le livre, 1964.

=== Translation in French ===
- Werfel F., L'Ami du monde, Paris, Stock, 1924.
- Blok A., Elégies, Bruxelles, Les cahiers du journal des poètes, 1935.
- Spitteler C., Prométhée et Epiméthée, Neuchâtel-Paris, Delachaux & Niestlé, 1940.
- Goethe, Iphigénie en Tauride, Genève, Cahiers du Carmel, 1950.
- Spitteler C., Printemps olympien, Genève, Ed. Pierre Cailler, 1950.
- Castellion S., De l'art de douter et de croire, d'ignorer et de savoir, Genève, Jeheber, 1953.
- Spitteler C., Le Second Prométhée, Neuchâtel, Delachaux & Niestlé, 1959.

== Charles Baudouin Fund ==
Charles Baudouin archives can be consulted in the following locations:

- The Bibliothèque de Genève
- The Carouge Museum in Carouge (Geneva),
- The Jean-Jacques Rousseau Institute in Geneva,
- The Archives of the International Institute of Psychoanalysis and psychotherapy Charles Baudouin in Geneva,
- The Swiss Literary Archives in Bern,
- The Bibliothèque nationale de France in Paris.
