= Vis medicatrix naturae =

Latin phrase affirming the body's self-healing nature

Vis medicatrix naturae (lit. 'the healing power of nature'; also known as natura medica) is the Latin rendering of the Greek Νόσων φύσεις ἰητροί ('Nature is the physician of diseases'), a phrase attributed to Hippocrates. While the phrase is not actually attested in his corpus, it nevertheless sums up one of the guiding principles of Hippocratic medicine, which is that organisms left alone can often heal themselves (cf. the Hippocratic primum non nocere).

== Hippocrates ==
Hippocrates believed that an organism is not passive to injuries or disease, but rebalances itself to counteract them. The state of illness, therefore, is not a malady but an effort of the body to overcome a disturbed equilibrium. It is this capacity of organisms to correct imbalances that distinguishes them from non-living matter.

From this follows the medical approach that “nature is the best physician” or “nature is the healer of disease”. To do this Hippocrates considered a doctor's chief aim was to help this natural tendency of the body by observing its action, removing obstacles to its action, and thus allow an organism to recover its own health. This underlies such Hippocratic practices as blood letting in which a perceived excess of a humors is removed, and thus was taken to help the rebalancing of the body's humor.

== Renaissance and modern history ==
After Hippocrates, the idea of vis medicatrix naturae continued to play a key role in medicine. In the early Renaissance, the physician and early scientist Paracelsus had the idea of “inherent balsam”. Thomas Sydenham, in the 18th century considered fever as a healing force of nature.

In the nineteenth-century, vis medicatrix naturae came to be interpreted as vitalism, and in this form it came to underlie the philosophical framework of homeopathy, chiropractic, hydropathy, osteopathy, and naturopathy.

== Relation to homeostasis ==
Walter Cannon's notion of homeostasis also has its origins in vis medicatrix naturae. "All that I have done thus far in reviewing the various protective and stabilizing devices of the body is to present a modern interpretation of the natural vis medicatrix.". In this, Cannon stands in contrast to Claude Bernard (the father of modern physiology), and his earlier idea of milieu interieur that he proposed to replace vitalistic ideas about the body. However, both the notions of homeostasis and milieu interieur are ones concerned with how the body's physiology regulates itself through multiple mechanical equilibrium adjustment feedbacks rather than nonmechanistic life forces.

== Relation to evolutionary medicine ==
More recently, evolutionary medicine has identified many medical symptoms such as fever, inflammation, sickness behavior, and morning sickness as evolved adaptations that function as darwinian medicatrix naturae due to their selection as means to protect, heal, or restore the injured, infected or physiologically disrupted body.

== In popular culture ==
In the novel The House of God, the protagonist cynically concludes that much of the practice of medicine is unnecessary and even harmful, and that patients tend to heal best when left alone. This leads him to develop the last of his Laws of the House of God: "The delivery of good medical care is to do as much nothing as possible."

== See also ==
- Appeal to nature – Rhetorical tactic and potential fallacy
- Élan vital – Hypothetical explanation for evolution and development of organisms
- Medicus curat, natura sanat – Medical aphorism ("the physician treats, nature heals")
- Royal Commission on Animal Magnetism – 1784 French scientific bodies' investigations involving systematic controlled trials
- Vitalism – Belief about living organisms
