= Mastermind group =

Peer-to-peer mentoring concept

A mastermind group is a peer-to-peer mentoring group used to help members solve their problems with input and advice from the other group members. The concept was coined in 1925 by author Napoleon Hill in his book The Law of Success, and described in more detail in his 1937 book Think and Grow Rich. In his books, Hill discussed the idea of the Master Mind, which referred to two or more people coming together in harmony to solve problems.

Cooperation through the use of mastermind groups was one of the "laws of success" which Hill allegedly studied from successful Americans including Henry Ford, Thomas Edison, Alexander Graham Bell, Theodore Roosevelt, Andrew Carnegie, John D. Rockefeller and Charles M. Schwab.

Several companies offer mastermind group environments to members and guidance in planning effective groups.

== Organization ==
There are two types of mastermind groups: one is focused on an individual's success, and the other is focused on the success of everyone in the group. Research suggests that optimal groups limit their size to 8 to 10 participants that meet regularly with rotating leadership.

== See also ==
- Leadership
- E-leadership
- Vienna Circle
