= Outwitting the Devil =

1938 self-help book by Napoleon Hill

- Cover of the 2011 Sterling Adult edition
- Author: Napoleon Hill
- Publisher: Sterling Publishing
- Publication date: Written in 1938, first published in 2011

Outwitting the Devil is a self-help book written in 1938 by Napoleon Hill, which was considered too controversial to be published in its era. The book is written as an interview between Hill (Mr. Earthbound) and the Devil (our inner dark self), wherein Hill attempts to uncover the secrets to freedom and success by evaluating the greatest obstacles that humans face in order to attain their personal goals in life. Outwitting the Devil was released by Sterling Publishing in June, 2011, with annotations by Sharon Lechter.

== Summary ==
Throughout the story, "Mr. Earthbound" interrogates "Your Majesty", to find out how people limit their success and how Satan achieves his manipulation.

Topics discussed in Outwitting the Devil include:

- The difference between drifters and non-drifters
- Maintaining a definiteness of purpose
- Finding one’s other self
- Hill’s seven principles
- The law of hypnotic rhythm

== History ==
After the release of Think and Grow Rich, Hill began writing Outwitting the Devil as an explanation of why some were still seeing failure after following all of the steps in Think and Grow Rich. His wife, Annie Lou, did not want the book published because of the role the Devil played in it. When Hill died in 1970, the manuscript went into the possession of Annie Lou, who died in 1984. After her death, the manuscript went into the hands of Dr. Charles Johnson, who was Annie Lou’s nephew and president of the Napoleon Hill Foundation. While Dr. Johnson believed the book’s message to be powerful, his wife, Frankie Johnson, shared Annie Lou’s feelings and told Dr. Johnson that she did not want the manuscript published while she was alive. After Frankie’s death, Dr. Johnson passed the manuscript to Don Green, CEO of the Napoleon Hill Foundation. Sharon Lechter was then asked to edit the manuscript, and after several years of annotations and reviews, it was released in June, 2011.

== Bibliography ==
- Outwitting the Devil: the Secret to Freedom and Success, by Napoleon Hill and Sharon L. Lechter. New York: Sterling Publishing, 2011. ISBN 1-4027-8453-8
- JM Emmert. Rich Man, Poor Man in SUCCESS, January 11, 2010.
- Douglas Paul Alp. Napoleon Hill - Outwitting the Devil on It's About Your Success, June 18, 2011.
- A Brief Essay by Dr. Hill About Life on The Napoleon Hill Foundation.
- Kimberley Mosher. Book Review: 'Outwitting the Devil', after over 70 years on TNGG // The Next Generation, June 18, 2011.
