= Frank Almonte =

American writer (born 1958)

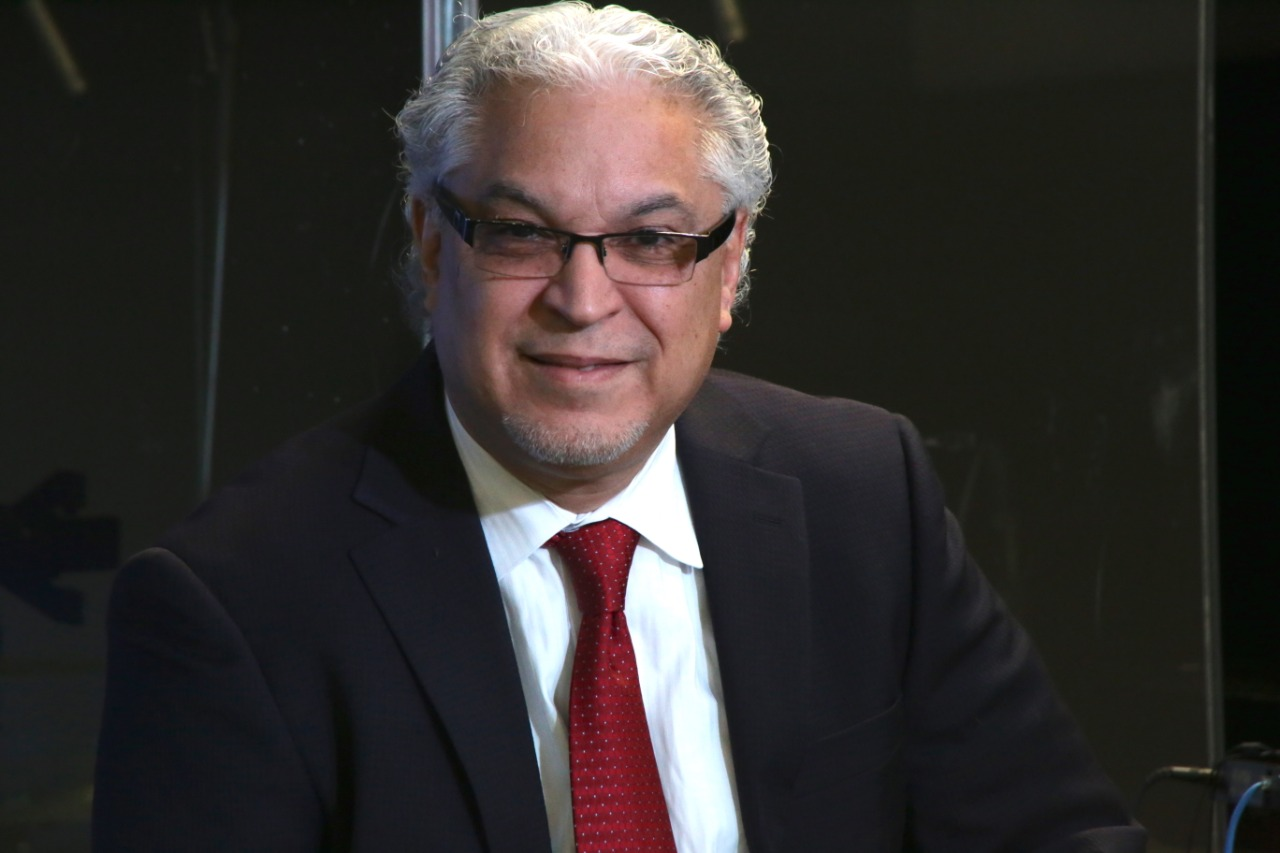

Personal life
- Born: Manuel Frank Almonte; May 6, 1958 (age 68) Santiago, Dominican Republic
- Spouse: Rosemary Almonte
- Children: 3

Religious life
- Religion: Non-denominational Christianity
- Church: Centro Cristiano Adonai

Senior posting
- Post: Senior pastor (1988–present)

Frank Almonte (born May 6, 1958) is the senior pastor of Centro Cristiano Adonai, in Corona, Queens in New York City. He is also the founder and president of Frank Almonte Ministries, Caring Foundation, the president of Facultad de Formación Teológica, and the director of the Texas University of Theology campus in Corona, New York. Almonte has published two books: Gobierno Apostólico (2010) and Riquezas de las Naciones (2012). Almonte also served as a radio host at Radio Visión Cristiana from 1989 to 1998.

== Early life and education ==
Manuel Frank Almonte was born in the Santiago Province of the Dominican Republic to Manuel F. Almonte and Luz Mercedes Sánchez. He earned his doctorate (Ph.D.) in theological studies from Texas University of Theology in 2017. In 2006, Almonte obtained an honorary degree in divinity from Logos Christian University in Jacksonville, Florida.

== Career ==
In 1978, Almonte earned a certificate as a radio host from International Academy of Locution, a division of the Cambridge University. He served as a host on Radio Visión Cristiana from 1989 to 1998. Almonte produced a weekly television show called Palabra Viva (English: Living Word), which was recorded during Sunday worship services at Centro Cristiano Adonai, and was transmitted in Queens and Brooklyn through Channel 66.

Almonte joined the staff of Centro Cristiano Adonai in 1986. He became senior pastor in 1988, at the age of 30, along with his wife Rosemary Almonte. As such, he oversees the church in Corona, New York, as well as churches in Massachusetts, New Jersey, Dominican Republic, and Argentina. Almonte is part of the Presbytery of Alberto Mottesi Evangelistic Association.

Almonte has been the director of Super Cadena Cristiana since 1997, a radio station that focuses on multi-media Bible instruction and worship music. Some of their shows like El Maná del Día and Palabra del Reino are transmitted to Argentina, Venezuela, and Spain. Almonte is also the founder and president of Katedras, a Christian ministry dedicated to training entrepreneurs and professionals through lectures, seminars, and workshops. He also successfully completed the John C. Maxwell Certification Program and is recognized as a John C. Maxwell Coach, Teacher, and Speaker.

Almonte currently serves as director of the Texas University of Theology campus in Corona, New York.

== Books ==
Almonte's first book, Gobierno Apostólico, was released in 2010. The book is about applying the principles of God in terms of government and leadership. His second book, Riquezas de las Naciones: El Deseo de Dios para tu Empresa, was released in 2012. It is about financial education within the Christian environment. Both books were released through God Reader Editorial.

== Honors ==
Through his career, Almonte has received several awards and recognitions:

- In 2001, he was honored with a Certificate of Consecration and Affirmation as an Apostle of the Church of Jesus Christ, by Reverend Angel M. Torres, Jr. from the American Ministerial Association.
- In 2003, he was recognized by José R. Peralta, a member of the New York State Assembly, District 39, for his contribution to the Queens community, as well as the city of Bayaguana in the Dominican Republic. Almonte had contributed to build a church and a school in the community.
- That same year, he was honored by the New York City Council for the social services and programs offered by Centro Cristiano Adonai, which include a free, monthly food pantry to residents, educational programs, and civic accountability.
- In 2010, Almonte received a Certificate of Achievement from the New York State Senate Puerto Rican and Latino Caucus for his commitment and contribution to the Latino community in New York City.

== Legal issues ==
In January 1999, Almonte was detained at John F. Kennedy International Airport when returning from a mission trip in Bayaguana, Dominican Republic. Authorities claimed that Almonte was trying to bring 300 steroid pills into the country, while he said he believed the pills were "appetite enhances". According to Almonte, the pills were prescribed by a doctor in Dominican Republic for his underweight 12-year-old son, Joel. As a result, Almonte spent 10 days in a federal prison in Pennsylvania. If convicted, he faced seven years in prison and possibly deportation. In March 1999, prosecutors moved to drop the charges against Almonte. When the dismissal was announced, a crowd of 3,000 supporters gathered outside Queens County Courthouse to show their support.
