= James Schafer =

James Schafer, James Schaffer or James Sahefer may refer to:

- James Bernard Schafer, American cult leader
- James Schaefer, American politician
- James Shaffer, American musician
- James Shaffer (pastor), American religious leader
