= The 21 Irrefutable Laws of Leadership =

1998 book by John C. Maxwell

- First edition cover
- Author: John C. Maxwell
- Language: English
- Subject: Leadership
- Genre: Self-help book
- Published: 1998 (Thomas Nelson)
- Publication place: United States
- Pages: 256
- ISBN: 978-0-785-27431-5
- OCLC: 124074806
- Dewey Decimal: 658.4/092
- LC Class: HD57.7.M3937 2007

The 21 Irrefutable Laws of Leadership: Follow Them and People Will Follow You is a 1998 book written by John C. Maxwell and published by Thomas Nelson. It is one of several books by Maxwell on the subject of leadership. It is the book for which he is best-known. The book was listed on The New York Times Best Seller list in April 1999 after marketing company ResultSource manipulated the list by making it look like copies of The 21 Irrefutable Laws of Leadership had been purchased by thousands of individuals when, in actuality, ResultSource had simply made a bulk order of the book. Christian businessperson John Faulkner was inspired to found Christian business magazine TwoTen when he read The 21 Irrefutable Laws of Leadership. Professional basketball player Harrison Barnes read and spoke positively of the book. US swimmer Annie Chandler Grevers wrote of Maxwell's book, "it's cheesy, but ... it did me some good". Columnist Michael Hiltzik of the Los Angeles Times criticized Maxwell for including in the book "the insidious subtext ... that externalities have nothing to do with your failure", an assertion that Hiltzik argues research studies have demonstrated to be false. John Maxwell Team mastermind groups have developed from the principles in this book.

== See also ==
- Autonomy
- Determination
- Empowerment
- Like attracts like
- Intuition
- Journalism
- Mastermind inner circle
- Moral character
- Openness
- Praise
- Positive psychology
- Power
- Reading body language
- Rapport
- Respect
- Trust
- Trends
- Investment
- Wu wei

== Bibliography ==
- Maxwell, John C. (1998). The 21 Irrefutable Laws of Leadership: Follow Them and People Will Follow You. ISBN 9780785274315.
