= John C. Maxwell bibliography =

List of books by John C. Maxwell

The following is a list of books by John C. Maxwell. His books have sold more than twenty million copies, with some on the New York Times Best Seller list. Some of his works have been translated into fifty languages. By 2012, he has sold more than 20 million books.

In his book, Sometimes You Win, Sometimes You Learn, Maxwell claims that he has published seventy-one different books.

== List of books by John C. Maxwell ==
Title	Publisher	Year	ISBN	Notes
Think on These Things	Beacon Hill Press	1979	ISBN 9780834106000	Re-released in 1999 (20th anniversary edition)
Tough Questions, Honest Answers	Here's Life Publishers	1985		Out of print
Be All You Can Be	Cook Communications	1987	ISBN 9780781448444	
Be a People Person	Cook Communications	1989	ISBN 9780781448437	
The Winning Attitude	Thomas Nelson	1990		Originally titled Your Attitude: Key to Success (Here's Life Publishers, 1984)
Developing the Leader Within You	Thomas Nelson	1993	ISBN 978-0-8407-6744-8	
Developing the Leader Within You Workbook	Thomas Nelson	1993		
The Time Crunch (contributor)	Multnomah Books	1993		
Your Family Time with God	Christian Parenting Books	1995		Out of print
Developing the Leaders Around You	Thomas Nelson	1995	ISBN 978-0-8407-6747-9	
Developing the Leaders Around You Workbook	Thomas Nelson	1995		
Partners in Prayer	Thomas Nelson	1996		
Living at the Next Level	Thomas Nelson	1996		
Breakthrough Parenting	Focus on the Family	1996		
Your Bridge to a Better Future	Thomas Nelson	1997		
Becoming a Person of Influence	Thomas Nelson	1997	ISBN 978-0-7852-7100-0	Co-authored with Jim Dornan
Becoming a Person of Influence Workbook	Thomas Nelson	1997		
The Heart of Christmas	Thomas Nelson	1998		Contributor
Destiny & Deliverance	Thomas Nelson	1998		Contributor
21 Irrefutable Laws of Leadership	Thomas Nelson	1998	ISBN 978-0-7852-7431-5	
21 Irrefutable Laws of Leadership Workbook	Thomas Nelson	1998		
The Power of Partnership	J Countryman	1999		
The 21 Indispensable Qualities of a Leader	Thomas Nelson	1999		
The 21 Indispensable Qualities of a Leader Workbook	Thomas Nelson	1999		
The Treasure of a Friend	J. Countryman	1999		
Failing Forward – Turning Your Mistakes into Stepping Stones for Success	Thomas Nelson	2000	ISBN 9780785274308	
Success, One Day at a Time	J. Countryman	2000		
The 21 Most Powerful Minutes in a Leader's Day	Thomas Nelson	2000	ISBN 978-0-7852-7432-2	
The Power of Leadership	Cook Communications	2001		Originally titled Leadership 101
The Power of Attitude	Cook Communications	2001		Originally titled You Can't Be a Smart Cookie if You Have a Crummy Attitude
The Right to Lead	J. Countryman	2001		
The Desert Experience	Thomas Nelson	2001		Contributor
Leading from the Lockers	Thomas Nelson	2001		
The 17 Indisputable Laws of Teamwork	Thomas Nelson	2001	ISBN 978-0-7852-7434-6	
The 17 Essential Qualities of a Team Player	Thomas Nelson	2002		
The 17 Essential Qualities of a Team Player Workbook	Thomas Nelson	2002		
Teamwork Makes the Dream Work	J. Countryman	2002		
Your Road Map for Success	Thomas Nelson	2002		Originally titled The Success Journey (Thomas Nelson, 1997)
Your Road Map for Success Workbook	Thomas Nelson	2002		
The Maxwell Leadership Bible	Thomas Nelson	2002		
Leadership 101	Thomas Nelson	2002	ISBN 9780785264194	
Running With the Giants	Warner Books	2002		
The Power of Influence	Cook Communications	2002		Originally titled People Power
The Power of Thinking Big	Cook Communications	2002		Originally titled It's Just a Thought, But It Could Change Your Life
Attitude 101	Thomas Nelson	2003	ISBN 9780785263500	
Thinking For a Change	Warner Business Books	2003	ISBN 978-0-446-52957-0	
Leadership Promises for Every Day	J Countryman	2003		
There's No Such Thing as "Business" Ethics	Warner Business Books	2003		Retitled Ethics 101 (August 2005)
Equipping 101	Thomas Nelson	2003	ISBN 9780785263524	
Relationships 101	Thomas Nelson	2003	ISBN 9780785263517	
The Journey From Success to Significance	J. Countryman	2004		
Today Matters	Warner Books	2004	ISBN 978-0-446-52958-7	
The Preacher's Commentary-Deuteronomy	Thomas Nelson Publishers	2004		Originally titled Deuteronomy Commentary (Word, 1987)
Winning With People	Thomas Nelson	2004	ISBN 978-0-7852-6089-9	One of Executive Book Summaries 30 Best Business Books in 2005
Winning With People Workbook	Thomas Nelson	2004		
Make Today Count		2004		
The Choice Is Yours	J. Countryman	2005		
25 Ways to Win with People	Thomas Nelson	2005	ISBN 9780785260943	Co-authored with Les Parrott
Life@Work	Thomas Nelson	2005		Co-authored with Addington & Graves
Life@Work Workbook	Thomas Nelson	2005		
The 360° Leader	Thomas Nelson	2005	ISBN 978-0-7852-6092-9	One of Executive Book Summaries 30 Best Business Books in 2003
Ethics 101		2005		
Dare to Dream	J. Countryman	2006		
The Difference Maker	Thomas Nelson	2006	ISBN 9780785260981	
Talent Is Never Enough	Thomas Nelson	2007	ISBN 9780785214038	
Talent Is Never Enough Workbook	Thomas Nelson	2007		
Maxwell Daily Reader		2007		
21 Irrefutable Laws of Leadership Workbook		2007		10th anniversary edition
21 Laws of Leadership	Thomas Nelson	2007		10th anniversary edition – revised & updated
Encouragement Changes Everything	Thomas Nelson	2008		
Leadership Gold: Lessons I've Learned from a Lifetime of Leading	Thomas Nelson	2008	ISBN 9780785214113	
Leadership Handbook		2008		
Mentoring 101		2008		
Success 101		2008		
Go For Gold		2008		
My Dream Map		2009		
Put Your Dream to the Test	Thomas Nelson	2009	ISBN 9780785214120	
How Successful People Think		2009	ISBN 9781599951683	Originally titled Thinking For a Change
Self-Improvement 101		2009		
Teamwork 101		2009		
Everyone Communicates, Few Connect: What the Most Effective People Do Differently	Thomas Nelson	2010	ISBN 9780785214250	
The 5 Levels of Leadership	Center Street	2011	ISBN 9781599953656	
Sometimes You Win, Sometimes You Learn	Center Street	2012	ISBN 9781599953663	
15 Invaluable Laws of Growth		2014		
How Successful People Lead		2013		
Good Leaders Ask Great Questions		2014		
How Successful People Grow	Center Street	2014	ISBN 9781599953687	15 Invaluable Laws of Growth
Jumpstart Your Leadership		2014		
Leading With the Giants		2014		
Intentional Living	Center Street	2015	ISBN 1455548154	
Jumpstart Your Growth	Center Street	2015	ISBN 9781455588312	Adapted from 15 Invaluable Laws of Growth
Jumpstart Your Thinking	Center Street	2015	ISBN 9781455588343	Adapted from Thinking for a Change
How Successful People Win		2015		
Wisdom From Women in the Bible		2015		
Jumpstart Your Priorities	Center Street	2016	ISBN 9781455588367	Adapted from Today Matters
How Successful People Know About Leadership		2016		
No Limits	Center Street	2017	ISBN 9781455548286	
The Power of Your Potential		2018	ISBN 9781455548309	Adapted from No Limits
Developing The Leader Within You 2.0	HarperCollins Leadership	2018	ISBN 9781543638066	25th anniversary edition of Developing The Leader Within You and with over 80% of content rewritten/new
Developing The Leader Within You 2.0 Workbook		2018		
Leadershift	HarperCollins	2019	ISBN 9780718098506	
Leadershift Workbook		2019		
How to Lead When Your Boss Can't (or Won't)		2019		
21 Leadership Issues in the Bible		2019		
21 Qualities of Leaders in the Bible		2019		
Leader's Greatest Return	HarperCollins Focus	2020	ISBN 978-1-4002-1766-3	
Change Your World	HarperCollins Leadership	2021		Co-Author: Rob Hoskins
Success is a Choice		2021		
The 16 Undeniable Laws of Communication	Maxwell Leadership Publishing	2023		
High Road Leadership	Forefront Books	2024	ISBN 979-8-88710-034-0	
