= Elmer R. Gates =

American scientist

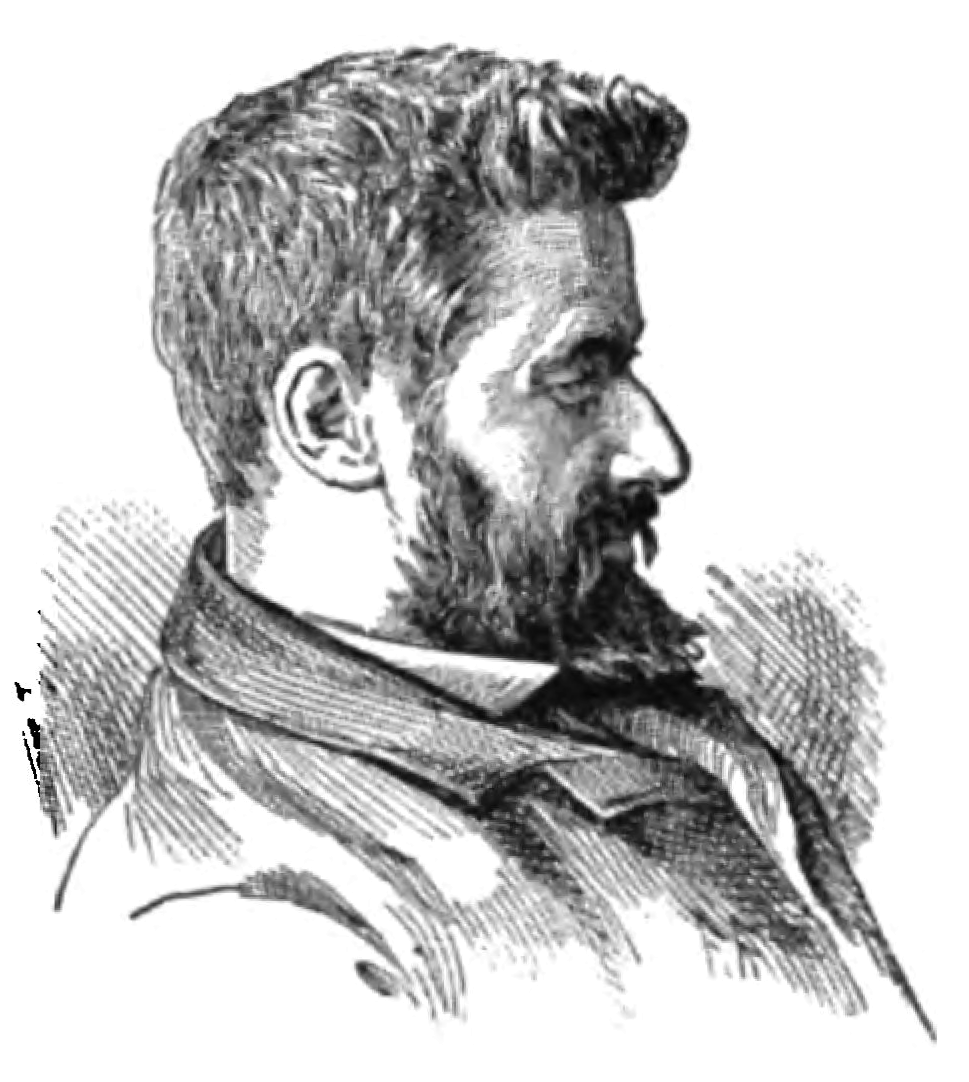
- Born: 1859; Dayton, Ohio
- Died: December 3, 1923 (aged 63–64); Washington, D.C.
- Occupations: Scientist, inventor
- Spouse: Phebe Edson (m. 1894)
- Children: 3

Signature
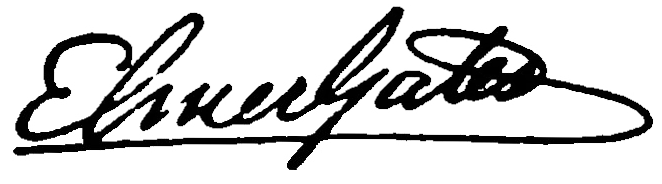

Elmer R. Gates (1859–1923) was an American scientist and inventor.

== Biography ==
Elmer R. Gates was born near Dayton, Ohio, in 1859, the son of Jacob and Phoebe Goetz. Most of his education took place with private tutors. He married Phebe Edson in 1894, and they had three children.

Gates's inventions include the foam fire extinguisher, an improved electric iron, an aseptic brewing and fermenting process, electric loom mechanisms, diamagnetic and magnetic separators for extracting gold from sand, an incandescent gas mantle furnace, the educational toy "Box and Block," and numerous other mechanical, scientific, psychological, and educational devices.

At the turn of the 20th century the Elmer Gates Laboratory in Chevy Chase, Maryland, was the largest private laboratory in the United States.

He died at his home in Washington, D.C., on December 3, 1923.

== Psychology ==
Although a prolific inventor, Gates considered himself to be a psychologist. He applied scientific experiment to introspection and used invention to examine the processes by which the mind discovers new knowledge. This study led him to "psychotaxis," the integrated hierarchy of sensory discriminations required to create a valid and complete mental representation of a given part of the physical world. Psychotaxis is a major component of "psychurgy," Gates's art of mind-using, which he regarded as an improved scientific method.

He conducted many animal experiments to ascertain the effects of refined sensory discriminations on the structure of the brain. He researched the chemistry and physiology of human emotions. For two years, four times daily, he kept three series of detailed records to determine the environmental and bodily conditions under which his own mentation was most successful.

The novel nature of his research caught the fancy of the popular press of his day. Misinterpretations and fabrications were common. Despite Gates's repeated clarifications and denials, the reports took on a life of their own; some persist today.

Gates and his system of generating ideas are mentioned in Napoleon Hill's popular book Think and Grow Rich. A rough description of the process is outlined in the "Genius Is Developed Through The Sixth Sense" section of Chapter 11.
