= Idle Hour =

Former Vanderbilt estate on Long Island, New York

Coordinates: 40.7426°N 73.1483°W

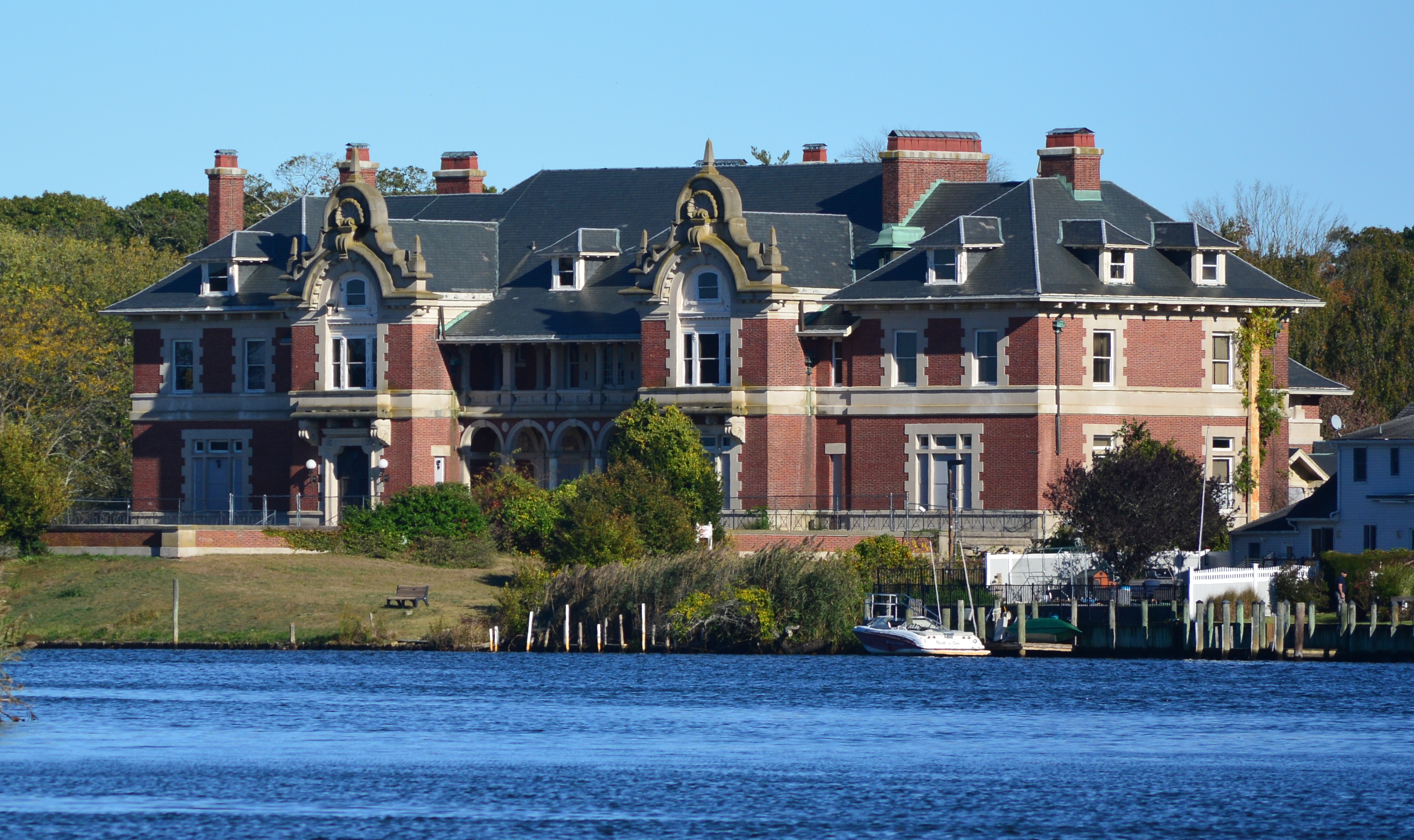
Idle Hour, October 2025, from the Bayard Cutting Arboretum across the Connetquot River

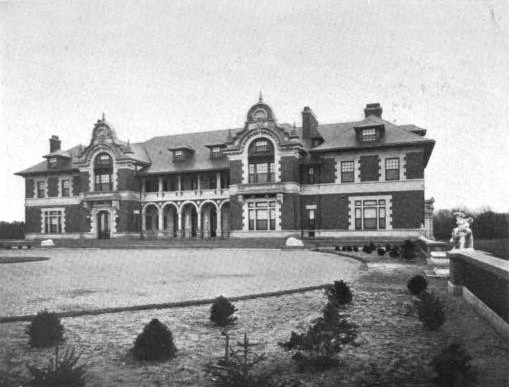
Photograph of Idle Hour from Architectural Record, c. 1903

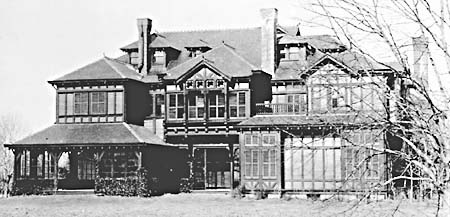
The original "Idle Hour", c. 1894

Idle Hour is a former Vanderbilt estate that is located in Oakdale on Long Island in Suffolk County, New York. It was completed in 1901 for William Kissam Vanderbilt. Once part of Dowling College, the mansion is one of the largest houses in the United States.

== History ==
In 1878, Alva and William Kissam Vanderbilt began building a lavish, wooden 110-room home known as Idle Hour, on a 900-acre (3.6 km^{2}) estate on the Connetquot River. The building, initially completed in 1882, was designed by Richard Morris Hunt of Hunt & Hunt (an American who studied at the École des Beaux-Arts in Paris), (Note: Richard Morris Hunt also designed Vanderbilt's Manhattan mansion, known as Petit Chateau (built between 1878 and 1882), and his wife's Newport, Rhode Island residence, known as Marble House (built between 1888 and 1892). Hunt's most famous design is arguably Biltmore Estate, which was built for Vanderbilt's younger brother, George Washington Vanderbilt II.) continuously added to until the home was destroyed by fire on April 15, 1899, while his son, Willie K. Vanderbilt, was honeymooning there. Willie and his new wife, Virginia Fair Vanderbilt, escaped the fire. His daughter Consuelo had also honeymooned there when she married Charles Spencer-Churchill, 9th Duke of Marlborough in 1895.

It was promptly rebuilt of red brick and gray stone in the English Country Style, with exquisite furnishings, for $3 million. The building was designed by Hunt's son, Richard Howland Hunt, and at the time was considered among the finest homes in America. The rebuilt estate "included nearly all of Oakdale, 290 or 300 buildings, a herd of steer and a paddlewheel steamer to ferry guests up and down the Connetquot River alongside the mansion." Around 1902, an addition was made to Idle Hour by the prominent architectural firm Warren & Wetmore.

=== Later ownership ===
William Kissam Vanderbilt died in 1920; in his will, he bequeathed Idle Hour and its contents to his younger son Harold Stirling Vanderbilt. The property was valued at $650,000 and the contents at $133,239 for probate purposes by William Vanderbilt's executors; Harold Vanderbilt had some difficulty finding a purchaser for the property, eventually selling Idle Hour for $460,521 in 1921.

The mansion went through several phases and visitors. In 1921, a syndicate headed by Frank Elbridge Webb agreed to purchase the estate and convert it to a country club, however they fell behind on payments and the deal was severed in 1923. Gangster Dutch Schultz had a brief stay in the 1930s. Around that time, cow stalls, pig pens and corn cribs on the farm portion of Idle Hour were converted into a short-lived bohemian artists' colony, known as the Royal Fraternity of Master Metaphysicians, that included figures such as George Elmer Browne and Roman (Bon) Bonet-Sintas as well as sculptor Catherine Lawson, costume designer Olga Meervold, pianist Claude Govier, Francis Gow-Smith, and his wife Carol.

In 1963, Adelphi College purchased the estate and, in 1968, spun the campus off as Dowling College (named after city planner and philanthropist Robert W. Dowling). In March 1974, the home sustained its second fire and required a $3 million renovation. The estate was home to Dowling College, a private co-educational college, until the college closed in August 2016.

In 2017, Idle Hour and the Dowling Campus were set to be auctioned off. In 2018, the U.S. Bankruptcy Court in Central Islip approved the $14 million purchase of the 105-acre (0.42 km^{2}) site. Mercury International LLC of Delaware, an affiliate of NCF Capital Ltd., owned it as of 2023.

=== Largest homes in the United States ===
The 70,000 sq ft (6,500 m^{2}) mansion ranks among the largest houses in the United States, tied with Woodlea in Briarcliff Manor, New York (built for his sister Margaret and brother-in-law Elliott Fitch Shepard in 1895).

== Gallery ==
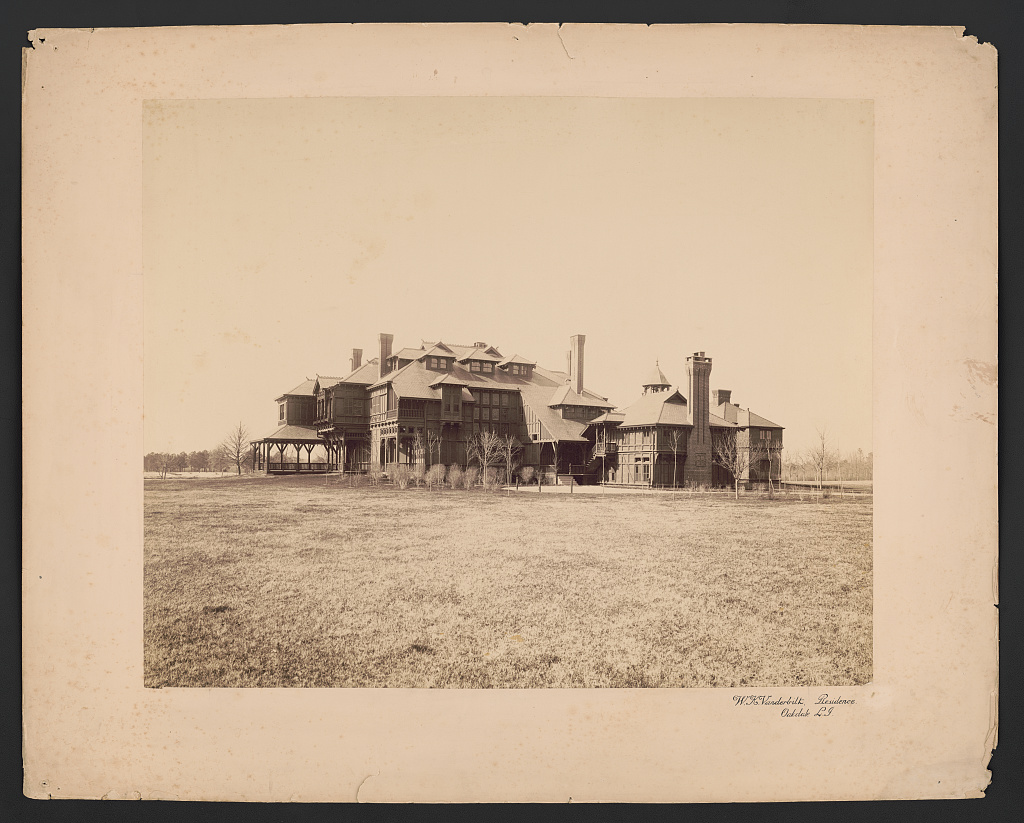
Photograph of Idle Hour, 1880

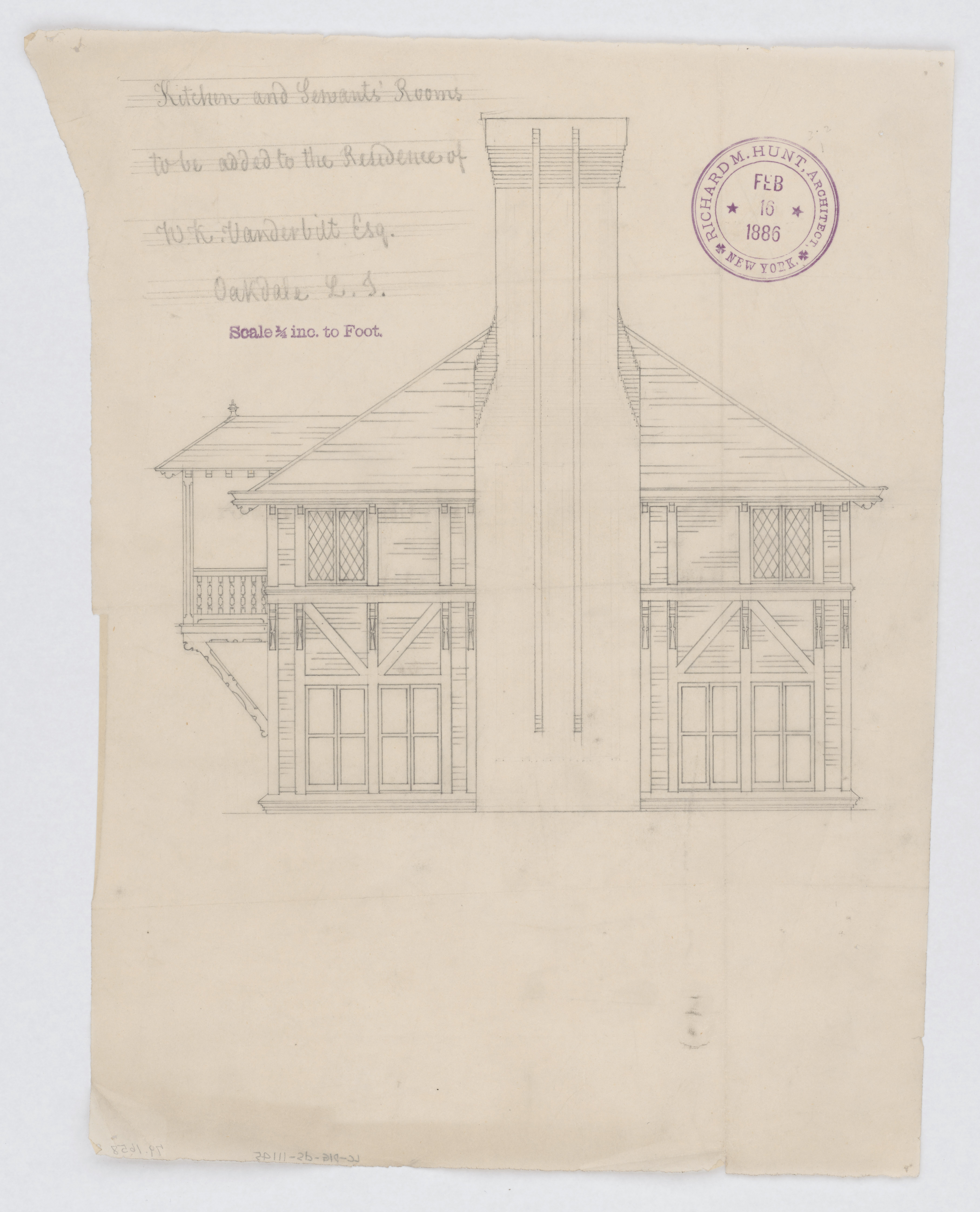
Kitchen and servants room' addition, 1886.

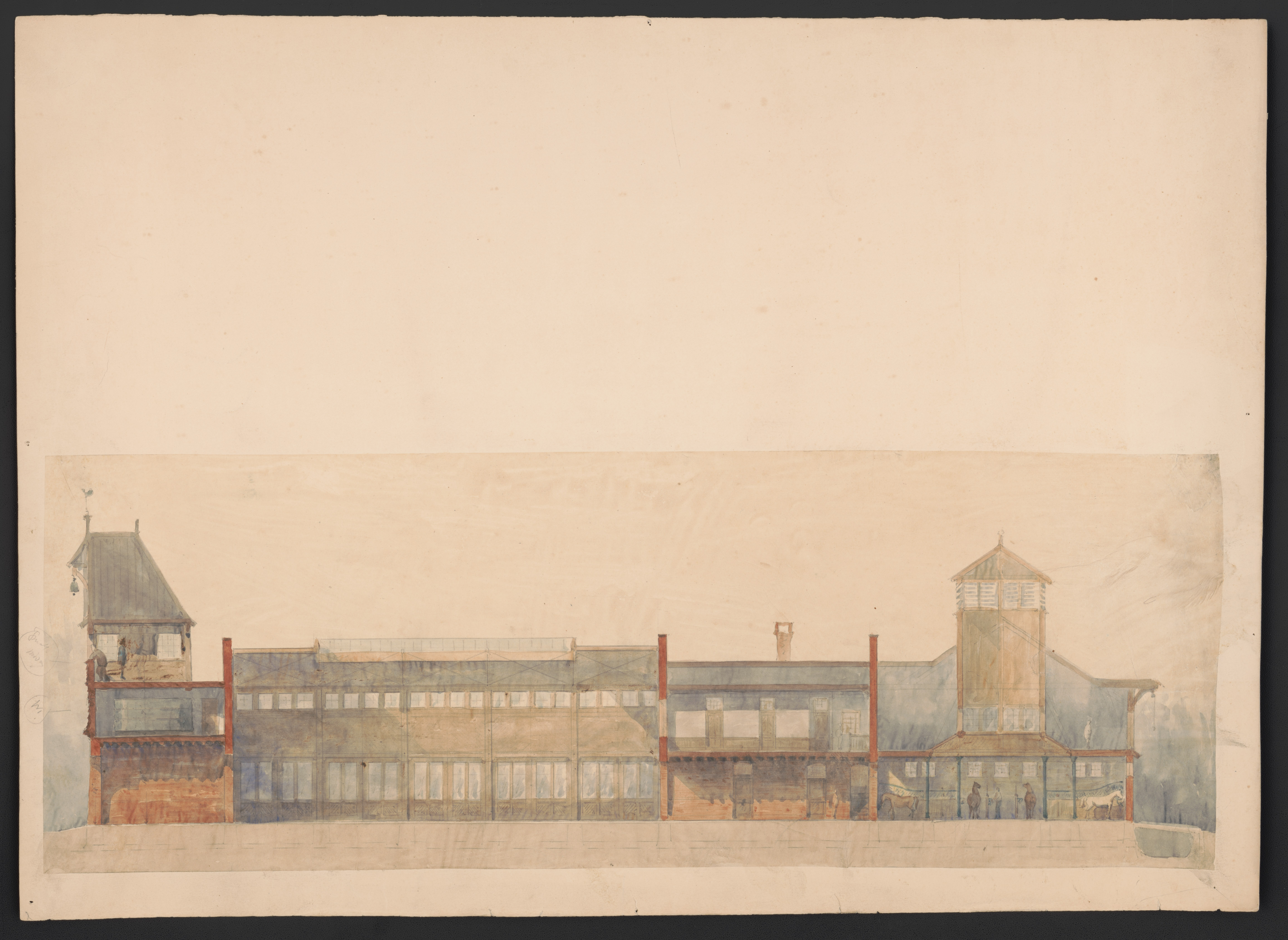
Architectural drawing of the stables, 1888.

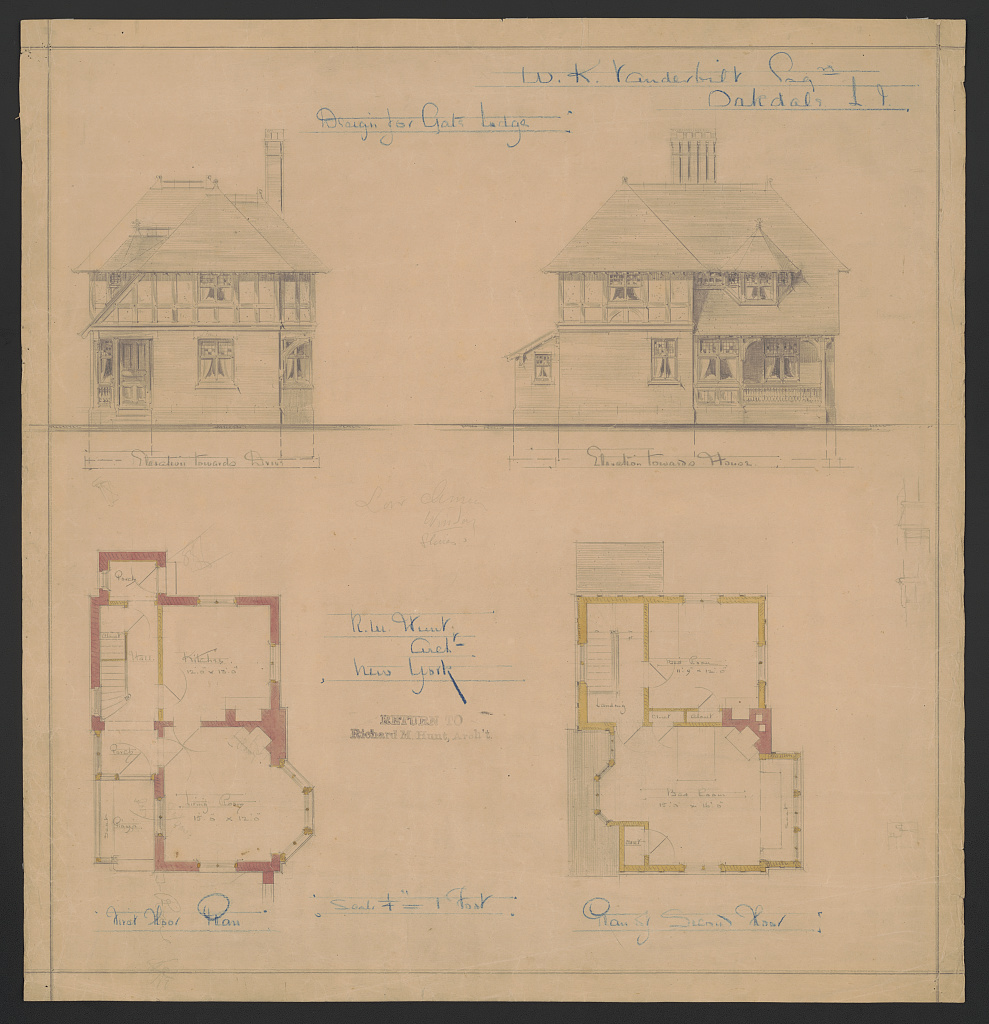
Architectural drawing, 1889

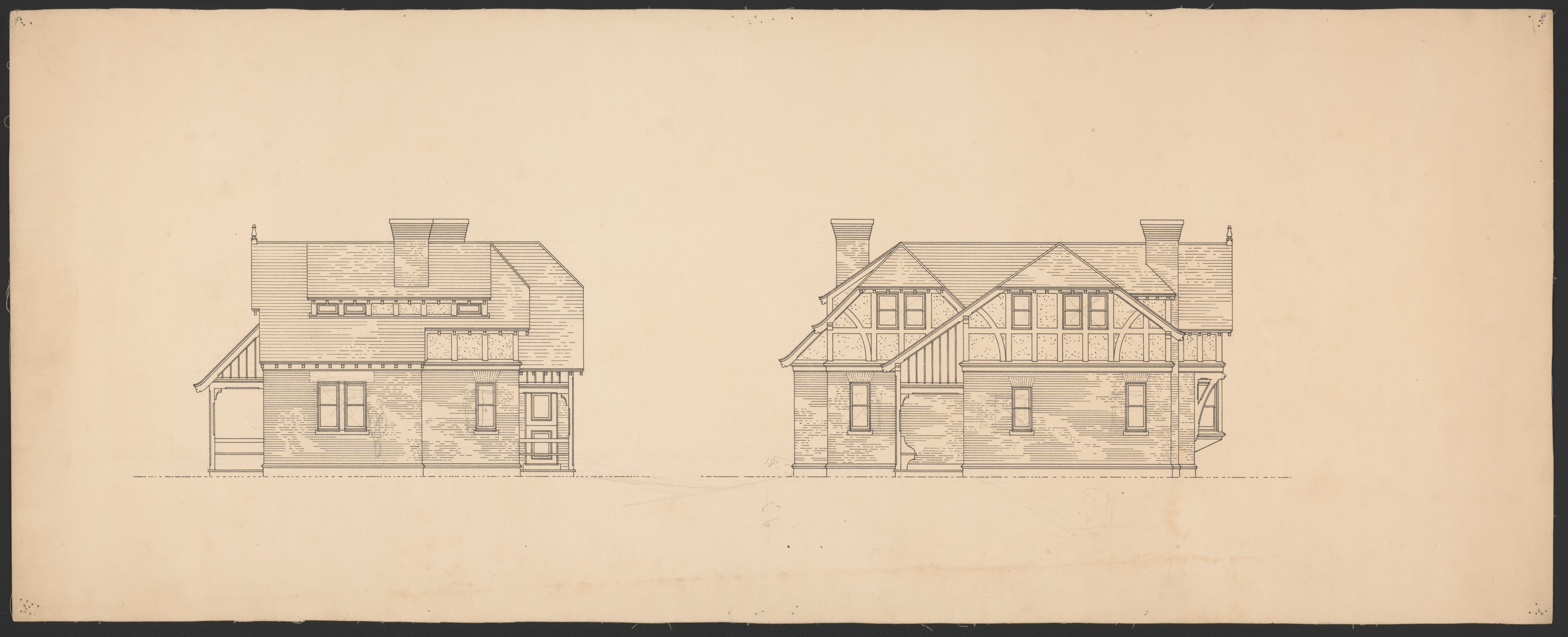
Architectural drawing, 1889

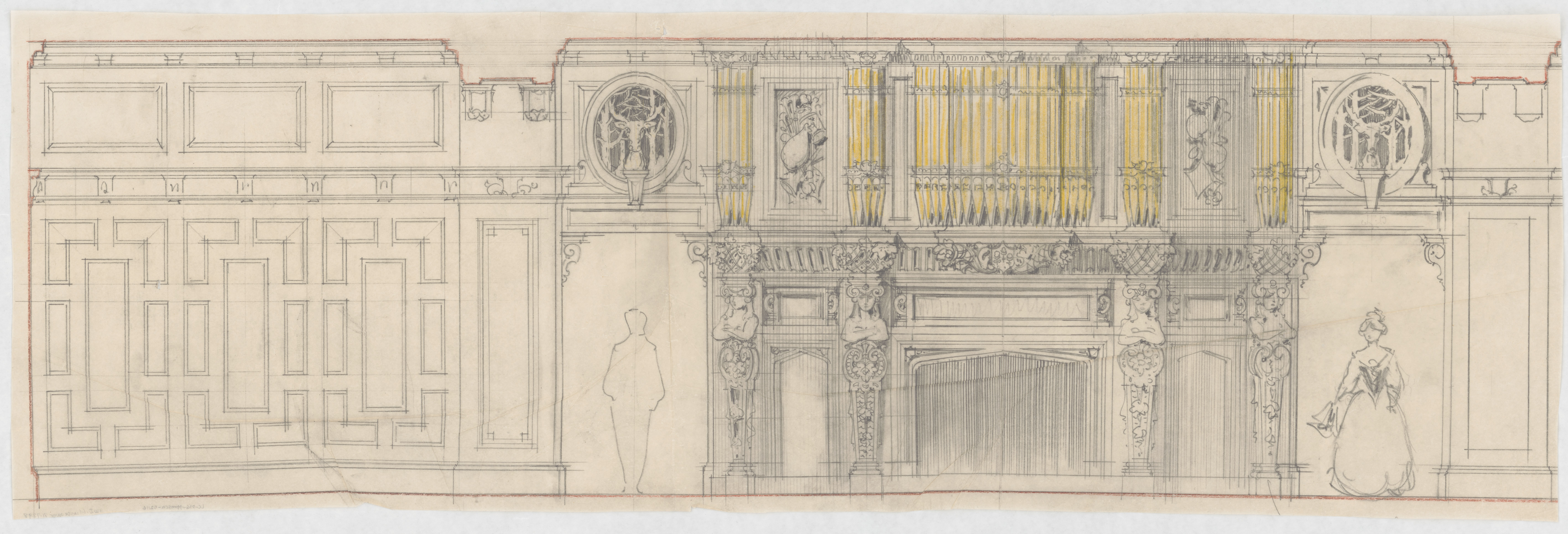
Architectural drawing of Idle Hour's interior, c. 1900-1901

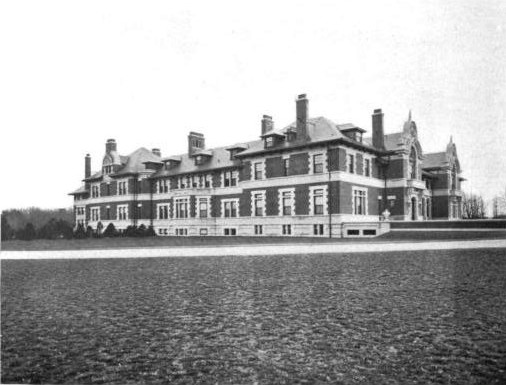
The north facade at Idle Hour, c. 1903

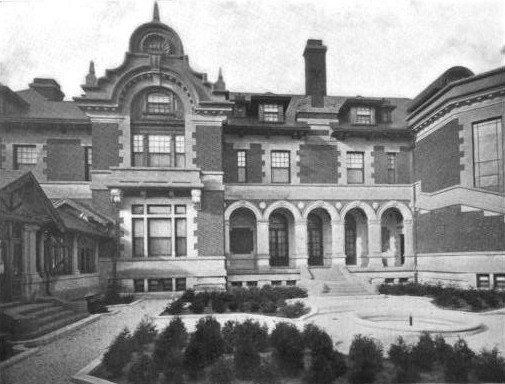
The inner courtyard at Idle Hour, c. 1903

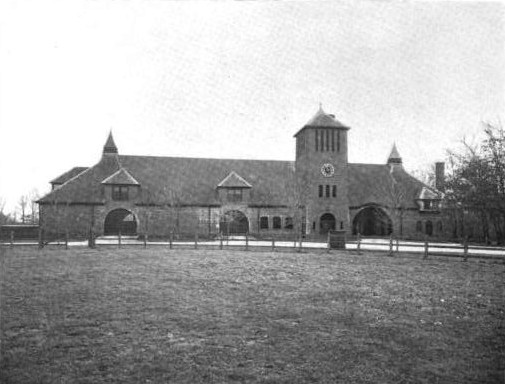
The stables at Idle Hour, c. 1903

== See also ==
- List of Gilded Age mansions
