= Napoleon Hill =

American author (1883–1970)

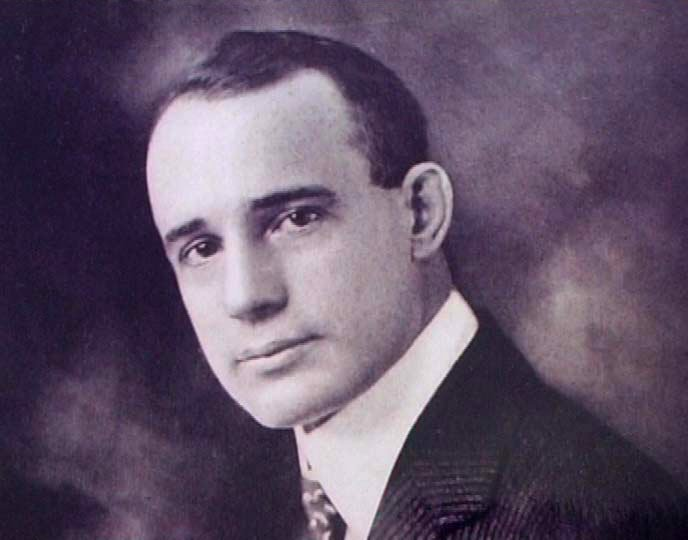
- Hill in 1904
- Born: Oliver Napoleon Hill; October 26, 1883; Pound, Virginia, U.S.
- Died: November 8, 1970 (aged 87); Greenville, South Carolina, U.S.
- Occupations: Author, journalist, salesman, lecturer
- Spouses: Unknown (m. 1899, annulled); Edith Whitman (m. 1903; div. 1908); Florence Elizabeth Horner (m. 1910; div. 1935); Rosa Lee Beeland (m. 1937; div. 1940); Annie Lou Norman (m. 1943–1970)
- Children: 4+
- Writing career
- Years active: 1928–1970
- Genres: Non-fiction, self-help
- Notable works: Think and Grow Rich (1937); The Law of Success (1928); Outwitting the Devil (1938)

Oliver Napoleon Hill (October 26, 1883 – November 8, 1970) was an American self-help author and con man who is best known for his book Think and Grow Rich (1937), which is among the best-selling self-help books of all time. Hill's works insisted that fervid expectations are essential to improving one's life. Most of his books are promoted as expounding principles to achieve "success".

Hill is a controversial figure. Having had a history of criminal charges and fraud accusations, historians also doubt many of his claims, such as that he met Andrew Carnegie and that he was an attorney.

== Life and career ==
=== Childhood ===
Hill was born in a one-room cabin near the Appalachian town of Pound in southwest Virginia. His parents were James Monroe Hill and Sarah Sylvania (Blair), and he was the grandson of James Madison Hill and Elizabeth (Jones). His grandfather came to the United States from England and settled in southwestern Virginia in 1847. His father was a dentist, at first unofficially and then with a license.

Hill's mother died when he was nine years old, and his father remarried two years later to Martha. According to Landers and Ritt, his stepmother was a good influence for him: "Hill's stepmother, the widow of a school principal, civilized the wild-child, Napoleon, making him go to school and attend church." At the age of 13, Hill began writing as a "mountain reporter", initially for his father's newspaper. At the age of fifteen, he married a local girl who had accused him of fathering her child; the girl later recanted the claim, and the marriage was annulled.

=== Early career ===
At the age of seventeen, Hill graduated from high school and moved to Tazewell, Virginia, to attend business school. In 1901, Hill accepted a job working for the lawyer Rufus A. Ayers, a coal magnate and former Virginia attorney general. Author Richard Lingeman wrote that Hill received this job after arranging to keep confidential the death of a black bellhop whom the previous manager of the mine had accidentally shot while drunk.

Hill left his coal mine management job soon afterward and enrolled in law school before withdrawing owing to a lack of funds. Later in life, Hill would use the title of "Attorney of Law", although Hill's official biography notes that "there is no record of his having actually performed legal services for anyone."

In 1903, Hill married for the second time to Edith Whitman; in 1905 their child Edith Whitman Hill was born. Their marriage was a fraught one due to Hill's alleged abuse of his wife and daughter in addition to his infidelity.

=== Failed business ventures and charges of fraud ===
Hill relocated to Mobile, Alabama, in 1907 and co-founded the Acree-Hill Lumber Company. In October 1908, the Pensacola Journal reported that the company was facing bankruptcy proceedings and charges of mail fraud for purchasing lumber on credit from outside Mobile, from other counties in Alabama and Florida, and selling it below cost, and failing to pay back the loan.

His wife Edith filed for divorce in 1908; at the proceedings Hill's friends and business partners testified to his affairs with prostitutes. It is sometime in 1908 that Hill claims his pivotal conversation with Andrew Carnegie happened; however, the existence of such a meeting is a point of contention amongst Hill biographers.

Following the exposure of his fraud in Alabama, Hill fled to Washington, DC, where he dropped Oliver as his first name and began going by Napoleon Hill. In 1909 he founded the Automobile College of Washington. The college assembled cars for the Carter Motor Corporation, which declared bankruptcy in early 1912; students were not paid for their labor. During April 1912, the automobile magazine Motor World accused Hill's college of being a scam and derided its marketing materials as "a joke to anyone of average intelligence". Following the bankruptcy of the Carter Motor Corporation, Hill pivoted the organization to teaching people how to sell cars rather than make them. Students were incentivized to themselves sell Automobile College of Washington courses on which they would earn a commission. In practice, the focus was on signing up more students, not in learning how to sell cars. In this form, it resembled a modern multi-level marketing company.

In June 1910, Hill married Florence Elizabeth Horner, with whom he had three sons: James, born in 1911; Napoleon Blair, born in 1912; and David, born in 1918. Hill would postpone their honeymoon until 1919. Horner was in high school when they met and was from a wealthy West Virginia family. Despite investment from her family, the Automobile College of Washington closed in 1912. He subsequently moved to Chicago and accepted a job with the La Salle Extension University, before co-founding the Betsy Ross Candy Shop. Hill was soon forced out of the candy shop by his partners and had left La Salle within a year of starting.

In September 1915, he established the George Washington Institute of Advertising (GWI), where he intended to teach principles of success and self-confidence. On June 4, 1918, the Chicago Tribune reported that the state of Illinois had issued two warrants for his arrest, charging him with violating blue sky laws by fraudulently attempting to sell shares of his school at a $100,000 capitalization, despite the school's possessing assets appraised only at $1,200.

In 1917, Hill threatened the Illinois Central Railroad with a lawsuit due to low lighting in their cars allegedly making him need glasses. The George Washington Institute was unaccredited and closed in 1918 following allegations of fraud made by students. During this time, Florence and their children were living with her family in West Virginia.

Following the closure of the George Washington Institute, Hill embarked on other business ventures, among them the personal magazines Hill's Golden Rule and Napoleon Hill's Magazine. In 1919 the Federal Trade Commission brought charges against Hill and Hill's Golden Rule for fraudulent advertising and laundering funds meant for a veteran's charity into a fraudulent oil stock scheme. Hill claimed that it was in 1918 following the collapse of GWI that Woodrow Wilson personally reached out to Hill for his help winning the First World War; Hill claimed that Wilson offered him large sums for his aid but that he did not accept any payment for his work because he was a patriot. He claimed that he was so important and involved in the war effort that he had the power to veto the President. Hill claimed to have participated intimately in the negotiation of the armistice with Germany. These claims are not believed to be true. White House records include no reference to his ever being there.

In 1922, he opened the Intra-Wall Correspondence School, a charitable foundation intended to provide educational materials to prisoners in Ohio. The foundation was directed by, among others, check forger and former convict Butler Storke, who would be sent back to prison only a year later. According to Hill's official biography, it was during this period that hundreds of documents proving Hill's association with various famous figures were destroyed in a Chicago storage fire. Intra-Wall Correspondence School primarily sold Hill's Golden Rule and correspondence courses. In 1923 it was exposed by local newspapers as a scam. Following the murder of Donald Mellett, he promoted a lecture tour based on their acquaintance, with Hill claiming to have been the target of the same assassins.

Hill lost control over Hill's Golden Rule to a group of disgruntled employees. Hill attempted to get revenge against one of the employees by reporting them to the FBI as a spy.

Hill founded the Peptomists and the Co-Operative Club which advertised themselves as business organizations in the style of the rotary club.

=== The Law of Success ===
During 1928, Hill relocated to Philadelphia and persuaded a Connecticut-based publisher to publish his eight-volume work The Law of Success (1925). The book was Hill's first major success, allowing Hill to adopt an opulent lifestyle. By 1929, he had already bought a Rolls-Royce and a 600-acre (240-hectare) property in the Catskill Mountains, with the aid of some lenders.

The beginning of the Great Depression, however, affected Hill's finances adversely, forcing his Catskills property into foreclosure before the end of 1929. He went broke, forcing his wife's family to pay for the expenses of Florence and her children.

Hill's next published work, The Magic Ladder to Success (1930), proved to be a commercial failure. During the next few years, Hill traveled through the country, returning to his habits from the prior decade of initiating various short-lived business ventures. He was involved in the production of one of the first Mormon films Corianton: A Story of Unholy Love, (Note: The Life of Nephi (1915) preceded Corianton: A Story of Unholy Love.) which collapsed after investors accused Hill of malfeasance. After the film's production, money from Corianton Corporation moved "freely into one of [Hill's] separate enterprises". Hill claimed to have been an advisor to President Franklin D. Roosevelt during this time, and to have coined Roosevelt's famous phrase "The only thing we have to fear is fear itself".

=== Think and Grow Rich ===
In 1937, Hill published the bestselling book Think and Grow Rich, which became Hill's best-known work. Hill's new wife Rosa Lee Beeland contributed substantially to the authoring and editing of Think and Grow Rich. Hill's biographers would later say this book sold 20 million copies over 50 years, although as Richard Lingeman remarks in his brief biography, "Alice Payne Hackett's 70 Years of Best Sellers suggests the number was considerably less."

Wealthy once more, Hill resumed his lavish lifestyle and purchased a new estate in Mount Dora, Florida. Napoleon and Rosa became involved with The Royal Fraternity of the Master Metaphysicians, a cult led by James Bernard Schafer, which regarded Think and Grow Rich as a religious text. Napoleon became the godfather of "Baby Jean", a child the cult had unofficially adopted and claimed to be raising in such a way that she would be immortal. In 1941 the child was returned to her biological mother. After being arrested and convicted in 1942, Schafer claimed that Napoleon had been to blame.

The couple divorced around 1940. With much of the wealth from the book going to Rosa, Napoleon returned to his pursuit of success. Rosa proceeded to marry her divorce lawyer. Rosa would later write a self-help book entitled How to Attract Men and Money.

=== Starting again ===
In 1941 Hill published Mental Dynamite, but it was a commercial failure.

Hill met Annie Lou Norman, who was 47 years old, when he rented a room from her. They married in 1943 and relocated to California. Hill went on the lecture circuit once again. In 1947 he briefly hosted a show on KFWB Radio in Los Angeles. In 1952 he launched a new scam selling courses about success in Missouri. The scam soon collapsed, and he set up a firm called Napoleon Hill Associates to sell courses with W. Clement Stone. In the 1960s Hill and Stone fell out. Hill turned to selling his course Science of Success through franchises. In 1963 he founded the Napoleon Hill Foundation.

== Philosophy of Achievement ==
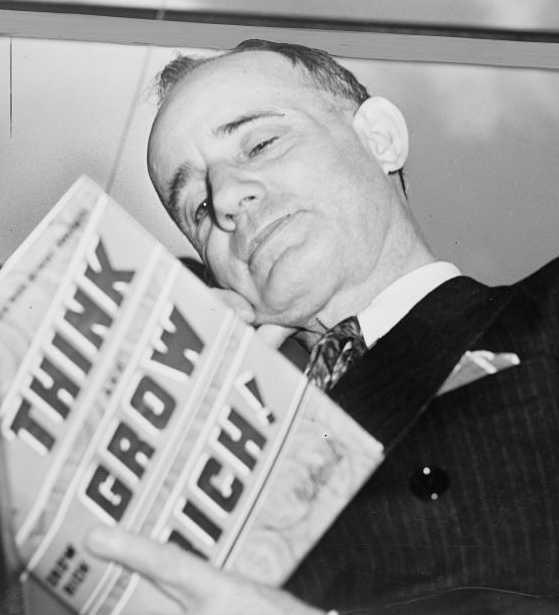
Napoleon Hill holding his book Think and Grow Rich, 1937.

Hill's "Philosophy of Achievement", offered as a formula for rags-to-riches success, was published initially in the 1928 multi-volume study course entitled The Law of Success, a rewrite of a 1925 manuscript. Hill identified freedom, democracy, capitalism, and harmony as being among the foundations to his "Philosophy of Achievement". He asserted that without these foundations, great personal achievements would not be possible.

Hill claimed his philosophy was superior to those of others and that its principles were responsible for the successes of Americans. Hill blamed failure on such emotions as fear and selfishness.

A "secret" of achievement was discussed in Think and Grow Rich, but Hill did not explicitly identify this secret in the book, insisting that readers would benefit most if they discovered it for themselves.

In the introduction, Hill states of the "secret" that Andrew Carnegie "carelessly tossed it into my mind" and that it inspired Manuel L. Quezon of the Philippine Islands to "gain freedom for his people". Although he mentions a "burning desire for money" repeatedly throughout the book, he suggests that avarice is not his "secret" at all.

Hill returned to the topic of a secret in a 1967 book, where he explicitly stated:

Anything the human mind can believe, the human mind can achieve. That is the Supreme Secret.... This is the secret known in bygone times; this is the secret which governs present-day accomplishment; this is the secret which will follow man to the stars. This is the secret of the ages.

— Napoleon Hill, Grow Rich!: With Peace of Mind, Chapter 14

He presents the notion of a "Definite Major Purpose" as a challenge to his readers to ask themselves: "In what do I truly believe?" According to Hill, "98%" of people have few or no strong beliefs, which made their achieving success unlikely.

Hill declares that the life story of his son Blair is an inspiration to him, claiming that despite being born without ears, Blair had grown up able to hear and speak almost normally. Hill reports that his son, during his last year of college, read chapter two of the manuscript of Think and Grow Rich, discovered Hill's secret "for himself", and then inspired "hundreds and thousands" of people who could neither hear nor speak.

From 1952 to 1962, Hill taught his Philosophy of Personal Achievement—Lectures on Science of Success in association with W. Clement Stone. During 1960, Hill and Stone co-authored the book Success Through A Positive Mental Attitude. Norman Vincent Peale is quoted saying that Hill and Stone "have the rare gift of inspiring and helping people" and that he owes "them both a personal debt of gratitude for the helpful guidance I have received from their writings."

The book is listed in John C. Maxwell's A Lifetime "Must Read" Books List.

Hill claimed insight into racism, slavery, oppression, failure, revolution, war, and poverty, asserting that overcoming these difficulties using his "Philosophy of Achievement" was the responsibility of every human.

=== Influence of famous people ===
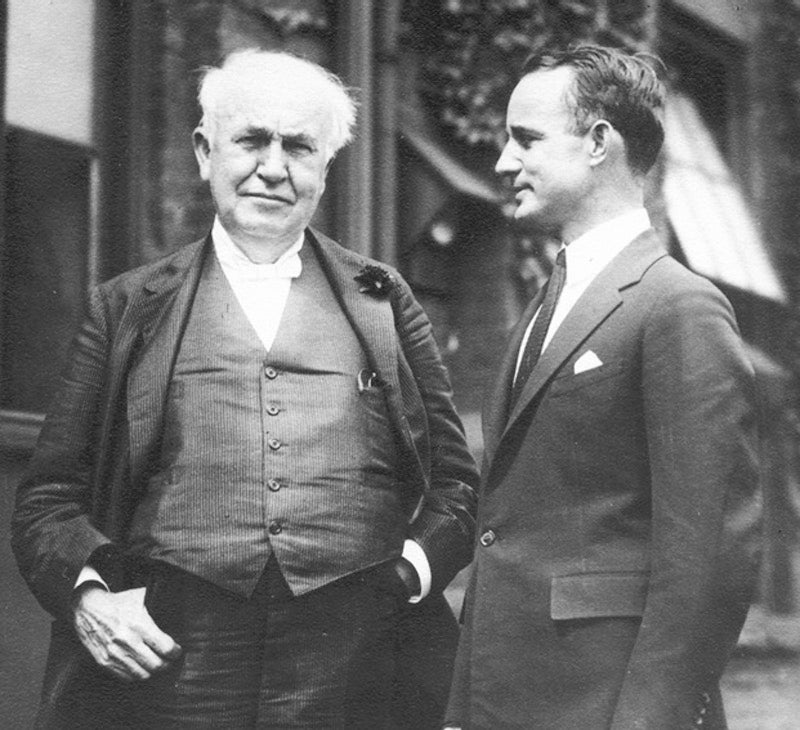
Thomas Edison (left) with Napoleon Hill after Hill presented Edison with an award that Edison returned (1923)

Later in life, Hill claimed that the turning point of his life had been a 1908 assignment to interview the industrialist and philanthropist Andrew Carnegie. At that time, Carnegie was among the most powerful men in the world. Hill wrote that Carnegie had actually met with him at that time and challenged him to interview wealthy people to discover a simple formula for success, and that he had then interviewed many successful people of the time. The authenticity of many of Hill's claims has been widely disputed. Napoleon Hill's collaboration with Andrew Carnegie has remained unsupported by any evidence.

The acknowledgments in his 1928 multi-volume work The Law of Success, listed forty-five of those he had studied, "the majority of these men at close range, in person", like those to whom the book set was dedicated: Andrew Carnegie, Henry Ford, and Edwin C. Barnes (an associate of Thomas Edison). Hill reported that Carnegie had given him a letter of introduction to Ford, who Hill said then introduced him to Alexander Graham Bell, Elmer R. Gates, Thomas Edison, and Luther Burbank.

Endorsements for The Law of Success were allegedly sent in by William H. Taft, Cyrus H. K. Curtis, Thomas Edison, Luther Burbank, E. M. Statler, Edward W. Bok, and John D. Rockefeller. The list in the acknowledgments includes, among those Hill wrote that he had personally interviewed, Rufus A. Ayers, John Burroughs, Harvey Samuel Firestone, Elbert H. Gary, James J. Hill, George Safford Parker, Theodore Roosevelt, Charles M. Schwab, Frank A. Vanderlip, John Wanamaker, F. W. Woolworth, Daniel Thew Wright, and William Wrigley Jr.

Aside from these, Hill's other claims have been called into question. There is little evidence that he aided President Wilson to negotiate Germany's surrender in World War I; that he helped President Roosevelt write his fireside chats; or that he was an attorney. There are no known records of Hill's meetings with the famous men he claimed to have interviewed apart from a brief photo op with Edison.

== Alleged spirit visitations ==
Hill openly described visits from spirits in chapter 12 of his book Grow Rich! With Peace of Mind (1967). He described them as unseen friends, unseen watchers, strange beings, and the Great School of Masters that had been guarding him, and who maintain a "school of wisdom". Hill states that the "Master" spoke to him audibly, revealing secret knowledge. Hill further insists that the Masters "can disembody themselves and travel instantly to any place they choose to acquire essential knowledge or to give knowledge directly, by voice, to anyone else."

Grow Rich! With Peace of Mind was allegedly influenced by Hill's spirit voices; Hill cites the "Master", writing: "Much of what he said already has been presented to you in the chapters of this book or will follow in other chapters." In Chapter 14 of his book Think and Grow Rich (1937), he openly talks about his "invisible counselors" with whom he discusses various areas of his life. Hill refers to these meetings with his counselors as being real because he consistently told himself they were real, a principle he refers to as "autosuggestion". Hill does admit the talks were only real to him because of his imagination but professes his belief that the "dominating thoughts and desires" of one's mind make those thoughts real.

== Death ==
Napoleon Hill died aged 87 on November 8, 1970. His estimated net worth at the time of his death was about $1 million ($8.29 million in 2025).

== Legacy ==
Hill's works were inspired by the philosophy of New Thought and the writings of Ralph Waldo Emerson, and are listed as New Thought reading. Author and historian Mitch Horowitz has noted Hill's popularization of a "Sixth Sense" as a creative faculty of the subconscious mind.

Hill has been seen as inspiring later self-help works, such as Rhonda Byrne's The Secret. Gizmodo has called him "the most famous conman you've probably never heard of".

=== Napoleon Hill Foundation ===
The Napoleon Hill Foundation is a nonprofit foundation that promotes the teachings of Napoleon Hill. Following the death of Napoleon in 1970, the foundation and his widow Annie Lou were embroiled in a protracted court battle over the estate, which lasted into the 1980s. The foundation maintains a private archive of Hill's papers. It awards the annual Napoleon Hill Award. The foundation continues to sell Hill's books, courses, and leadership certificates.

In 1995 the authorized biography of Hill's life, A Lifetime of Riches, was released by Michael J. Ritt Jr. (the executive director of the foundation) and Kirk Landers, which came to a number of controversial conclusions.

== Works ==
- The Law of Success (1928)
- The Magic Ladder to Success (1930)
- Think and Grow Rich (1937)
- Outwitting the Devil (1938, published 2011)
- How to Sell Your Way Through Life (1939)
- The Master-Key to Riches (1945)
- How to Raise Your Own Salary (1953)
- Success Through a Positive Mental Attitude (with W. Clement Stone) (1959)
- Grow Rich!: With Peace of Mind (1967)
- Succeed and Grow Rich Through Persuasion (with E. Harold Keown) (1970)
- You Can Work Your Own Miracles (1971)

== See also ==
- Dale Carnegie
- Law of Attraction
- Jack Canfield
