= Think and Grow Rich =

1937 book by Napoleon Hill

- Original Hardcover
- Author: Napoleon Hill and Rosa Lee Beeland
- Original title: Think and Grow Rich
- Language: English
- Subject: Personal-success; Self-help
- Genre: Non-fiction
- Publisher: The Ralston Society
- Publication date: 1937
- Publication place: United States
- Media type: Print (Hardcover, Paperback, E-Book)
- Pages: 238 pages
- ISBN: 978-1-78844-102-5
- OCLC: 156886959

Think and Grow Rich is a book written by Napoleon Hill and Rosa Lee Beeland released in 1937 and promoted as a personal development and self-improvement book. Hill claimed to be inspired by a suggestion from business magnate and later-philanthropist Andrew Carnegie, though historians doubt this claim.

The book is considered a classic in the personal development genre and has been widely influential in shaping the way people think about success and wealth.

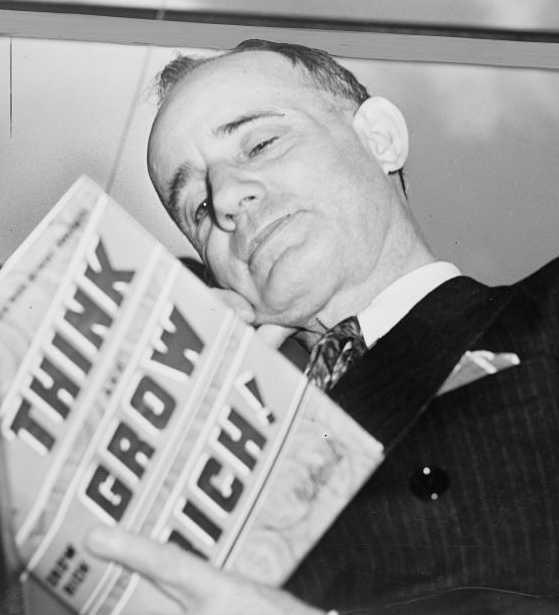
Napoleon Hill holding his book Think and Grow Rich

== History ==
In 1935, Napoleon Hill's second wife Florence filed for and received a divorce. In 1936, Napoleon met Rosa Lee Beeland when she attended one of his lectures. He proposed the next day and they were soon married. Unable to afford a place of their own, they moved in with Hill and Florence's son, Blair, in New York City. Following a few months of this living arrangement, Blair's wife, Vera, left due to Hill's harassment and abuse. Blair left shortly thereafter. Before leaving, however, Blair gave his father and Rosa a loan to continue work on their new book, Think and Grow Rich.

Think and Grow Rich was published in 1937 and became a major commercial success. Beeland contributed substantially to the authoring and editing of Think and Grow Rich. Hill and Beeland divorced in 1940, with the latter retaining the royalties from the book, given that they had been put in her name to protect them from any claims made by Hill's second wife, Florence, and her children. Hill and Beeland reportedly never repaid Blair for the $300 loan with Rosa taunting Blair about the matter.

== Summary ==
Think and Grow Rich is based on Hill's earlier work The Law of Success, claims to be the result of more than twenty years of study of many individuals who had amassed personal fortunes. Hill studied their habits and drew some 16 "laws" to be applied to achieve success. Think and Grow Rich condenses them, providing the reader with 14 principles in the form of a "Philosophy of Achievement".

The main theme of the book is that anyone can achieve success and wealth by following a certain set of principles. Hill identified these principles as the "13 Steps to Riches," which included developing a positive mental attitude, setting clear and specific goals, developing a plan to achieve those goals, taking action, and maintaining a strong belief in oneself and one's capabilities. The 13 "steps" were:

- 1. Desire: Start with a strong desire or burning ambition to achieve a specific goal or outcome.
- 2. Faith: Have unwavering faith in yourself and your ability to achieve your goal.
- 3. Autosuggestion: Use positive self-talk and affirmations to reinforce your beliefs and goals.
- 4. Specialized knowledge: Acquire the knowledge and skills needed to achieve your goal.
- 5. Imagination: Use your imagination to visualize your goal and see yourself achieving it.
- 6. Organized planning: Develop a detailed plan of action to achieve your goal.
- 7. Decision: Make a firm decision to follow through on your plan and never give up.
- 8. Persistence: Keep working towards your goal, even when faced with obstacles or setbacks.
- 9. Power of the Master Mind: Surround yourself with like-minded people who support and encourage you.
- 10. The Mystery of Sex Transmutation: Use the power of your sexual energy to fuel your desire and drive.
- 11. The Subconscious Mind: Tap into the power of your subconscious mind to help you achieve your goals.
- 12. The Brain: Use your brain to analyze and plan, and to make decisions and take action.
- 13. The Sixth Sense: Trust your intuition and inner guidance to help you make the right decisions and achieve your goals.
- 14. Thoughts are things
- 15. Six ghosts of fear

== Accuracy ==
Although Hill claims to have had a pivotal conversation with Andrew Carnegie in 1908, there is no record of the two having met. Hill spent much of the year on the run from the authorities for committing lumber fraud in Alabama. Hill did not claim to have met Carnegie until after Carnegie's death in 1919. Aside from Hill's writings, there are no accounts of the meeting taking place. Carnegie biographer David Nasaw stated that he "found no evidence of any sort that Carnegie and Hill ever met" or "that the book was authentic."

There are no known records of Hill meeting the famous men he claimed to have interviewed; that is, besides a brief encounter with Thomas Edison.

== Influence ==
First published during the Great Depression, it remains the biggest seller of Napoleon Hill's books. BusinessWeek magazine's Best-Seller List ranked it the sixth best-selling paperback business book 70 years after it was published. Think and Grow Rich is listed in John C. Maxwell's A Lifetime "Must Read" Books List.

Hill's biographers would later say this book sold 20 million copies over 50 years, although Richard Lingeman in his brief biography, "Alice Payne Hackett's '70 Years of Best Sellers' suggests the amount was considerably less."
