= E-leadership =

E-leadership is a social influence process, mediated by technology, to produce a change in attitudes, feelings, thinking, behavior, and performance with individuals, groups, or organizations to direct them toward achieving a specific goal. As stated by Avolio and Kahai (2002), this involves enhancing the relationships among organizational members in a context in which work is mediated by technology. According to Andreas Kaplan, e-leadership drives transformation through tech-savviness and people-centeredness. In this case, communication and the collection and dissemination of information occurs via information technology. Traditionally, leadership in organizations involves face-to-face interaction. Now, leaders may lead entire projects from a distance and interact with followers solely through information technology. Today, organizations are incorporating technology for workplace communication, creating a need for e-leadership. This wiring involves forms of technology such as videoconferencing, online collaboration software, cellphones, e-mail, and Wi-Fi. As a result, organizations are struggling with technological-integration issues while employees face a steep learning curve. However, our understanding of how information systems change human dynamics has lagged behind the introduction and use of new technology. Thus, technology is being used without knowing the full extent of its impact on human dynamics in organizations.

== The challenge of virtual leading ==
According to Cook (2010), leaders in a virtual environment have the same basic responsibilities as face-to-face leaders such as organizing and motivating teams, monitoring progress, and developing team members. especially since technology allows one to work from anywhere, However, e-leaders face added challenges such as monitoring from a distance, building teams drawn from different cultures, motivating followers, responding to questions, increasing flexibility to meet rapid technological changes, and developing technical skills like learning how to use technology to facilitate leadership. Additionally, enhanced communication skills are needed to establish trust, closeness and ensure messages aren't misinterpreted which requires more often communication and extra work. Finally, it is difficult to establish close bonds when separated by time and space; thus e-leaders have a significant role in the development of relationships in virtual teams.

== E-leadership research ==
Researchers have investigated e-leadership in both the organizational and laboratory setting. According to Avolio and Kahai (2002), field studies of virtual teams suggest that early interactions during the formation of the teams can predict subsequent trust, satisfaction, and performance. For example, teams who spent early meetings identifying team members and clarifying expectations were found to have higher performance several months later. Thus, in order to provide virtual teams with a reason to work together, e-leaders should promote interdependence and reliance on each other. Virtual teams may be geographically and culturally dispersed. Thus, in order to foster close relationships in geographically dispersed teams, leaders should encourage a variety of task-related communication. E-leadership has also been investigated in more controlled settings. According to Avolio and Kahai (2002), controlled experiments on e-leadership suggest that participative leadership may be more suitable for generating solutions for un- or semi-structured problems while directive leadership may be more suitable for generating solutions for structured problems. These studies also report that features of the groupware system that is used for communication may substitute for leadership. Finally, controlled experiments also report that motivation is enhanced by anonymity. Thus, e-leaders should probably consider using anonymous chat rooms and polls as mentioned previously.

== E-Leadership Approaches/Styles ==
E-leadership can involve the same style and content as traditional face-to-face leadership, especially as the advancement of technology enables more visual virtual interactions. Participative leadership involves creating opportunities for individuals to be more involved in decision-making. Considering the importance of having members involved in the decision-making process, participative e-leaders can use technology such as chat rooms with anonymous input and electronic polls as tools to inform both their followers and themselves. Like the more traditional transformational leadership, e-leadership can also be inspiring. To this end, e-leaders can use tools such as e-mail to communicate compelling visions, pride in the accomplishments of followers, or excitement about new ventures.

== Successful E-leadership ==
In the case of e-leadership, a successful leader may have the added challenge of building relationships and trust more rapidly. Close personal relationships are possible in virtual settings and leaders can aid in fostering them by considering factors of media richness. In choosing modes of communication, these leaders must consider its capacity to provide immediate feedback, availability of personalization, and language variety. To this end, leaders need to learn the vividness and interactivity of media to make their presence felt in a positive way. Avolio and Kahai (2002) mention that successful e-leadership involves an appropriate balance of traditional and new methods, avoiding misunderstandings by carefully and clearly communicating intent to followers, using technology to reach out to others in responsive ways, and using technology to deal with greater workforce diversity.

== See also ==
- Leadership
- Leadership style
- Business communication
- Virtual team
- Industrial and organizational psychology
