= James Bernard Schafer =

American conman

James Bernard Schafer Master Metaphysician
- Born: 1896; Fargo, North Dakota, US
- Died: April 26, 1955 (aged 59); West Nyack, New York, US
- Other name: The Messenger
- Education: University of Michigan Medical School
- Occupation: Cult leader
- Known for: Immortal Baby hoax
- Criminal charge: Grand larceny
- Criminal penalty: c. 5 years prison
- Spouse: Cecilia Lawrence Schafer
- Children: 1

James Bernard Schafer (1896 – April 26, 1955) was a man primarily known as the founder of a cult known as the Royal Fraternity of Master Metaphysicians and by an attempt to raise an "immortal baby".

== Early years ==
Press coverage of Schafer in connection with the Royal Fraternity of Master Metaphysicians mentions that he was born in Fargo, North Dakota, had a medical degree and that he had been a member of the Ku Klux Klan.

== Royal Fraternity of Master Metaphysicians ==
The origin of the organization is obscure. Its name doesn't appear in newspapers until 1938, when it made a noteworthy real estate purchase. In subsequent press accounts the origin is stated to be in "the 1920s" with a membership in "the thousands" by the 1930s. It is also stated that it attracted mostly middle-aged women. An inner circle of male members known as "The Storks" made layettes for "needy, expectant mothers".

On January 13, 1938, the group purchased the 24-acre Idle Hour estate of William Kissam Vanderbilt on Long Island. Schafer renamed it "Peace Haven", and opened it as a retreat for those who purchased a "fellowship", the price of which was initially $100 (equivalent to $2,315 in 2025 dollars) but ballooned to $500 by the end of 1940.

Pepperidge Hall, former mansion of Christopher R. Robert, was nearly purchased by the group in 1939. However, the sale later fell through.

A building at 217 W. 57th Street, built by Jay Gould as a stable, was purchased by the group in February 1940 as the location for an auditorium. The group also purchased the Adelphi Theatre, changed its name to the "Radiant Center", and put on metaphysical plays there.

=== The immortal baby ===
In November 1939, Schafer announced his intention to bring Baby Jean, whose mother, a waitress named Catherine Gauntt, was too poor to raise her, into the mansion and prepare her for everlasting life through metaphysics and a special vegetable diet. Members of the community believed that if the child never heard any words related to death or disease, her mind would be so conditioned as to preserve her from old age, sickness and death. Schafer referred to the Bible's 1 Corinthians 15:26 -- "The last enemy to be destroyed is death"—and Mary Baker Eddy's Christian Science philosophy "Death must be overcome, not submitted to" in explaining Jean's proposed education. It was intended that she eventually become the group's immortal leader. However, the experiment terminated early, in December 1940, when the group returned Baby Jean to her parents, citing both her parents' wishes and the cost. Later, her mother filed suit. Grand larceny charges were also filed by the New York Attorney General, John J. Bennett Jr.

Questions centered on various lawsuits filed by others against the group and also Baby Jean's property, which included a diamond ring supposedly valued at $50,000 (equivalent to $1,149,050 in 2025).

The group encountered financial difficulties during the trial and Peace Haven was foreclosed and auctioned off.

On March 24, 1942, Schafer pleaded guilty and was sent to Sing Sing on May 5 for a term of at least 5 years. During that time, he lost Peace Haven, which became part of now-defunct Dowling College. Upon his release, he opened a correspondence school in metaphysics in upstate New York and published a magazine devoted to metaphysical issues.

== Later years ==
On April 26, 1955, Schafer and his wife Cecilia were found dead in their car on the grounds of his school. There was a suicide note on the seat beside them, detailing instructions for their daughter on how to continue operating the school. It also stated that they had "no other way out." Schafer was 59. His wife was 55.

== Works ==
- Schafer, James B.; William M. Evers; Éliphas Lévi (1937). 20 Lectures on Truth.
- ———————— (1939). The Royal Fraternity of Master Metaphysicians: Student Class Work. Royal Fraternity of Master Metaphysicians. 720 pages.
- ————————. Mental Magic: The Miracle Power for Producing. Metaphysical Service Bureau.
- ———————— (1982). The Treasure Chest. 64 pages.

== See also ==
- Napoleon Hill
