= The Law of Success =

1925 book by Napoleon Hill

- Author: Napoleon Hill
- Language: English
- Subject: Personal-success; Self-help
- Publisher: Tribeca Books
- Publication date: 1928
- Publication place: United States
- Media type: Print (Hardcover, Paperback, E-Book)
- Pages: 1170
- ISBN: 978-1612930862; 978-1-61720-178-3
- OCLC: 230208806

The Law of Success is a book written by Napoleon Hill in 1925. It was originally released as a set of 15 separate booklets before being consolidated into a single-tome book. The Law of Success in 16 Lessons is an edited version of Napoleon Hill’s first manuscript, which was reworked under the advisement of several contributors. This version was initially published in 1928 as a multi-volume correspondence course. Later editions consolidated the material into a single book.

== Contents ==
Hill frequently refers to 'The Temple of Success', and cites the laws and their collective understanding to be the door to the Temple of Success. It is the author's stance that thinking is the most organized form of energy. The 16 lessons include The Law of the Mastermind, A Definite Chief Aim, Self-Confidence, Habit of Saving, Initiative and Leadership, Imagination, Enthusiasm, Self-Control, Doing More than Paid For, A Pleasing Personality, Accurate Thinking, Concentration, Cooperation, Profiting by Failure, Tolerance, and The Golden Rule.

== History ==
According to Hill, the work was commissioned at the request of Andrew Carnegie, at the conclusion of a multi-day interview with Hill. It was allegedly based upon interviews with over 100 American millionaires, including self-made industrial giants such as Henry Ford, J. P. Morgan, John D. Rockefeller, Alexander Graham Bell and Thomas Edison, across nearly 20 years. The Law of Success was first presented as a lecture, and was delivered by its author in many major cities and in many smaller localities throughout the United States over a period of more than seven years. One set of manuscripts Hill had set in leather covers and the pages embossed with gold.

== Publication ==
According to authors Michael J. Ritt Jr. and Kirk Landers, publishers were "aghast at the financial risks" involved in publishing the work, due to its extensive length and Hill's lack of experience in the book publishing business. It was originally released as a set of 15 separate booklets before being consolidated into a single-tome book. There were 118 limited edition copies, which were given to many of America's most successful individuals, all of whom had contributed to the content of the book. Orne Publishing used one of these original copies to create a reprinted version of The Law of Success in 2010.

The Law of Success in 16 Lessons is an edited version of Napoleon Hill’s first manuscript, which was reworked under the advisement of several contributors. This version was initially published in 1928 as an eight volume series. Later editions consolidated the material into a single hardcover book. It was republished by Penguin Books in 2009 as a single paperback edition.

== Reception ==
Reviewing an audiobook version, California Bookwatch stated that "Joel Fotinos provides a clear and solid reading of the fifteen principles to winning, written by a motivational leader who builds a lesson plan for achievement", praising the book as "an outstanding work stimulating the mind and offering a path for achievement for all kinds of people". Library Journal said, reviewing the book in 2008, that the work "may be as useful now as it was 80 years ago", but that the newer edition did not contextualize the dated mindset of the book. They described the work as a "fascinating amalgam of what has since become familiar [...] and what has not".

In a biography of Hill in 1995, Michael J. Ritt Jr. and Kirk Landers described the work as "a flawed, rambling, sometimes incomprehensible document that a skilled text editor with a strong sense of book market imperatives might have condensed to a slick, fast-reading, fifty-page chapter", but that "reduced to safe, conventional publishing practices. Law of Success would most likely have been a very ordinary book with a very temporary life. Its imperfect, unvarnished defiance of convention was part of its raw power and freshness."
