= John C. Maxwell =

American pastor and author

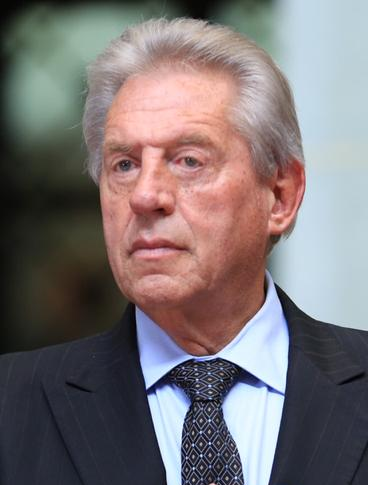
- Maxwell in 2018
- Born: John Calvin Maxwell; Garden City, Michigan
- Occupations: Author, pastor, professional speaker
- Relatives: Larry Maxwell (brother)
- Writing career
- Period: 1979–present
- Subject: Leadership
- Movement: Personal Development
- Website: www.maxwellleadership.com

John C. Maxwell is an American author, speaker, and pastor who has written books primarily focused on leadership. Titles include The 21 Irrefutable Laws of Leadership and The 21 Indispensable Qualities of a Leader. Some of his books have been on the New York Times Best Seller list.

== Early life and education ==
John Calvin Maxwell was born in Garden City, Michigan, in 1947. His father was in ministry. Maxwell completed a bachelor's degree at Circleville Bible College in 1969, a Master of Divinity degree at Azusa Pacific University, and a Doctor of Ministry degree at Fuller Theological Seminary.

== Career ==
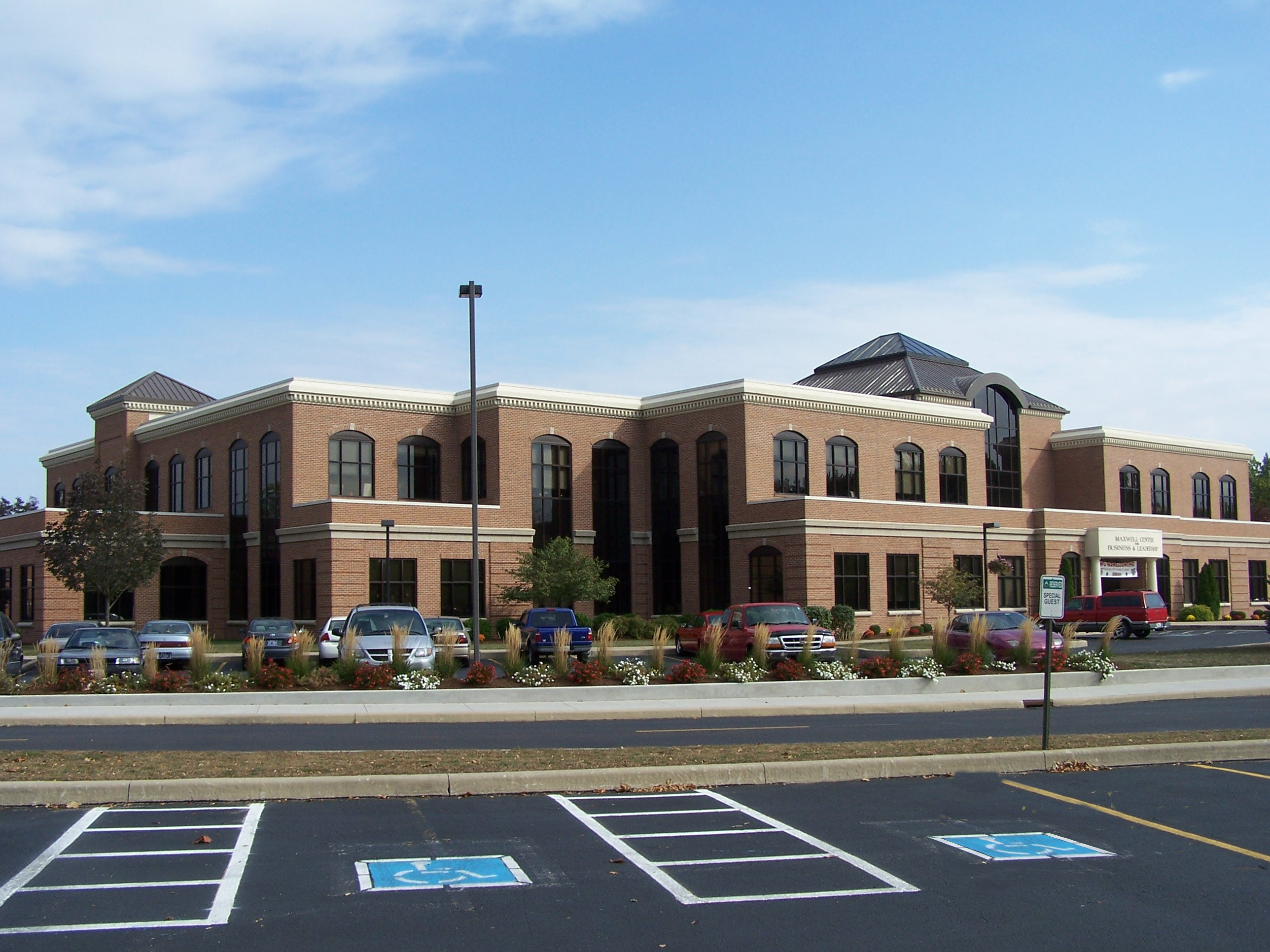
Indiana Wesleyan University's Maxwell Center

An evangelical Christian, Maxwell followed his father into ministry. He is an ordained minister in the Wesleyan Church.

Since the 1970s, Maxwell has led churches in Indiana, Ohio, California, and Florida.

He became senior pastor of the Skyline Church in 1981. He stayed for 14 years, leaving in 1995.

In 1992, he founded InJoy, a stewardship company which helped with the funding of churches and projects through consultancy and other plans for churches to have a "fully funded vision".

In 1998, he published the book The 21 Irrefutable Laws of Leadership which became a New York Times bestseller in April 1999. There was controversy over this when it turned out that rather than many people purchasing this book, marketing company ResultSource had made a bulk order of the book (more information in controversies section).

In 2004, he returned to congregational ministry at Christ Fellowship in Palm Beach Gardens, Florida, where he is currently a teaching pastor.

On November 16, 2008, he began working as a guest pastor at Crystal Cathedral in Orange County, California. His messages were shown on the Hour of Power television program.

In 2010, he was a keynote speaker for the National Agents Alliance conference.

In 2011, he founded the Maxwell Leadership Certified Team. He is one of the speakers for this organization. This organization is for the certification of coaches and speakers and trainers. The Maxwell Leadership Certified Team now states there are over 50,000 certified members. This certification gives people the resources and the rights to use the Maxwell library of leadership content.

In 2014 he was named in Inc.'s list of "Top 50 Leadership and Management Experts".

In 2025, he was at the top of the leadership gurus list on Global Gurus, a move up from position 3 the previous year. In 2026, he was off the list entirely.

== Published works ==
The following are some of the published works by the title subject:

- There's No Such Thing as Business Ethics (There's Only One Rule for Making Decisions), Warner Business Books 2003
- The 15 Invaluable Laws of Growth, Center Street – 2012
- The 5 Levels of Leadership, Center Street – 2011
- Everyone Communicates, Few Connect: What the Most Effective People Do Differently, Thomas Nelson –2010
- Put Your Dream to the Test, Thomas Nelson – March 2009
- Leadership Gold: Lessons I've Learned from a Lifetime of Leading, Thomas Nelson – March 2008
- The 360° Leader, Thomas Nelson, January 2006 – One of Executive Book Summaries 30 Best Business Books in 2003
- Winning With People, Thomas Nelson, December 2004 – One of Executive Book Summaries 30 Best Business Books in 2005
- 25 Ways to win with People companion to Winning with People
- Today Matters, Warner Books, April 2004
- Thinking For a Change, Warner Business Books, March 2003
- Your Road Map for Success, Thomas Nelson, March 2002 (Orig. titled: The Success Journey, Thomas Nelson, 1997)
- The 17 Indisputable Laws of Teamwork, Thomas Nelson, August 2001
- Failing Forward: Turning Your Mistakes into Stepping Stones for Success, Thomas Nelson, 2000
- The 21 Irrefutable Laws of Leadership, Thomas Nelson, 1998
- Developing the Leaders Around You, Thomas Nelson, 1995 (Repackaged 2003)
- Success One Day at a Time, Thomas Nelson, 2000 (Repackaged 2007)
- Developing the Leader Within You, Thomas Nelson, 1993 (Repackaged 2001)
- Be a People Person, Cook Communications (Originally Chariot-Victor Books, 1989)
- Be All You Can Be, Cook Communications (Originally Chariot-Victor Books, 1987)
- Make Today Count, Center Street, First Center Street Edition: June 2008
- How Successful People Think (originally published as Thinking for a Change), Center Street, First Center Street Edition: June 2009
- Intentional Living: Choosing a Life That Matters, Center Street, 2015
- Developing the Leader Within You 2.0, HarperCollins, 2018

== Controversies ==
In March 2022, Maxwell visited the anti-abortion "Conference for Life and Family" organized by Guatemalan president Alejandro Giammattei, accused of corruption and authoritarian policies. During his visit, Maxwell praised Guatemalan Attorney General Consuelo Porras, who had been criticized for her persecution of anti-corruption officials and named by the U.S. State Department on a list of corrupt and anti-democratic actors in the region. Maxwell called Porras "a rockstar" and "a leader amongst leaders".

In March 1999, his book, The 21 Irrefutable Laws of Leadership hit The New York Times Best Seller list. It then later turned out that a marketing company, ResultSource had in fact bulk ordered these books, in a move which was described as a manipulation of the list.

== Personal life ==
As of 2020, Maxwell resides in Palm Beach, South Florida, with his wife, Margaret.

On March 12, 2009, Maxwell was arrested at Palm Beach International Airport for trying to board a plane with a concealed weapon. According to the report, the TSA screener noticed a handgun displayed inside Maxwell's briefcase. Maxwell told TSA officials that the gun was recently given to him as a gift and that he had simply forgotten to take it out of the briefcase. He was charged with possession of a concealed weapon while attempting to board an airplane and was released from jail on bond, while awaiting trial. Maxwell addressed the incident on his personal website, calling it "one of the stupidest things" he has ever done.

== See also ==
- Leadership studies
- Transformational leadership
- Servant leadership
- The 21 Irrefutable Laws of Leadership
