= Emerald Tablet =

Hermetic text

- Smaragdine Table; Tabula Smaragdina
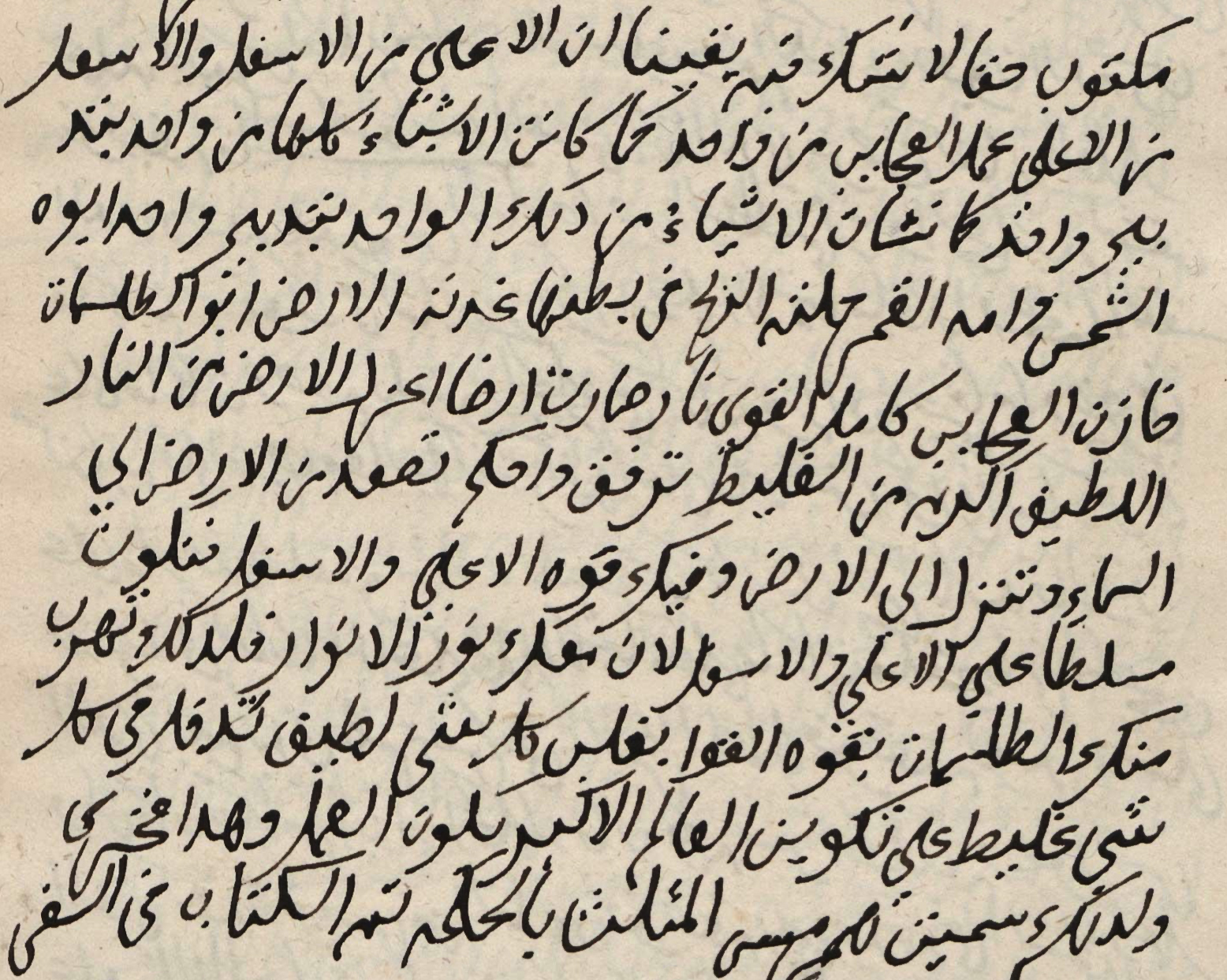
- Manuscript of the oldest recension of the Emerald Tablet, recension A of the Book of the Secret of Creation. (Leipzig, Vollers 832).
- Ascribed to: Hermes Trismegistus
- Compiled by: pseudo-Apollonius of Tyana; pseudo-Aristotle; Jabir ibn Hayyan
- Language: Arabic; possibly from earlier Greek or Syriac
- Date: late 8th or early 9th century CE (earliest Arabic recension)
- Provenance: Islamicate world
- State of existence: extant in various medieval manuscripts
- Authenticity: pseudepigraphical
- Genre: Hermetica
- Subject: cosmogony; possibly alchemy or talismanic magic
- Sources: Book of the Secret of Creation; Secret of Secrets; Second Book of the Element of the Foundation; Book of the Silvery Water and the Starry Earth vulgate

The Emerald Tablet, also known as the Smaragdine Table or the Tabula Smaragdina, (Note: Latin paraphrase of an Arabic expression like لوح الزمرد (lawḥ al-zumurrudh, lit. 'the tablet of emerald', Arabic pronunciation: [lawħ az.zu.mur.ruð]).) is a compact and cryptic text traditionally attributed to the legendary Hellenistic figure Hermes Trismegistus. The earliest known versions are four Arabic recensions preserved in mystical and alchemical treatises between the 8th and 10th centuries CE—chiefly the Secret of Creation (Arabic: سر الخليقة, romanized: Sirr al-Khalīqa) and the Secret of Secrets (سرّ الأسرار, Sirr al-Asrār). It was often accompanied by a frame story about the discovery of an emerald tablet in Hermes' tomb.

From the 12th century onward, Latin translations—most notably the widespread so-called vulgate—introduced the text to Europe, where it attracted great scholarly interest. Medieval commentators such as Hortulanus interpreted it as a "foundational text" of alchemical instructions for producing the philosopher's stone and making gold. During the Renaissance, interpreters increasingly read the text through Neoplatonic, allegorical, and Christian lenses; and printers often paired it with an emblem that came to be regarded as a visual representation of the Tablet itself. Vernacular translations of the Latin vulgate also started to appear, such as an English translation prepared by Isaac Newton. (Note: Newton's translation reads as follows: "Tis true without lying, certain and most true. That which is below is like that which is above and that which is above is like that which is below to do the miracle of one only thing. And as all things have been and arose from one by the mediation of one: so all things have their birth from this one thing by adaptation. The Sun is its father, the moon its mother, the wind hath carried it in its belly, the earth is its nurse. The father of all perfection in the whole world is here. Its force or power is entire if it be converted into earth. Separate thou the earth from the fire, the subtle from the gross sweetly with great industry. It ascends from the earth to the heaven and again it descends to the earth and receives the force of things superior and inferior. By this means you shall have the glory of the whole world and thereby all obscurity shall fly from you. Its force is above all force, for it vanquishes every subtle thing and penetrates every solid thing. So was the world created. From this are and do come admirable adaptations where of the means is here in this. Hence I am called Hermes Trismegist, having the three parts of the philosophy of the whole world. That which I have said of the operation of the Sun is accomplished and ended." (Newton 2010).)

Following the 20th-century rediscovery of Arabic sources by Eric Holmyard and Julius Ruska, modern scholars continue to debate its origins. They agree that the Secret of Creation, the Tablet's earliest source and its likely original context, was either wholly or at least partly compiled from earlier Greek or Syriac materials. The Tablet remains influential in esotericism and occultism, where the phrase as above, so below (a paraphrase of its second verse) has become a popular maxim. It has also been taken up by Jungian psychologists, artists, and figures of pop culture, cementing its status as one of the best-known Hermetica.

== Background and early Arabic versions ==
Beginning from the first century BCE onwards, (Note: The earliest unambiguous evidence dates from the first century BCE, but some texts may go back as far as the second or third century BCE.) Greek texts attributed to Hermes Trismegistus, a syncretic combination of the Greek god Hermes and the Egyptian god Thoth, appeared in Greco-Roman Egypt. These texts, known as the Hermetica, are a heterogeneous collection of works that in the modern day are commonly subdivided into two groups: the technical Hermetica, comprising astrological, medico-botanical, alchemical, and magical writings; and the religio-philosophical Hermetica, comprising mystical-philosophical writings.

These Greek pseudepigraphal texts found receptions, translations, and imitations in Latin, Syriac, Coptic, Armenian, and Middle Persian prior to the emergence of Islam and the Arab conquests in the 630s. These conquests brought about various empires in which a new group of Arabic-speaking intellectuals emerged. These scholars received and translated the aforementioned wealth of texts and also began producing Hermetica of their own. By the tenth century, some Arabic-speaking Muslims had come to identify Hermes with the prophet Idris, thereby elevating the Hermetica to the level of other Islamic prophetic revelations. Until the early twentieth century, only Latin versions of the Emerald Tablet were known in the Western world, with the oldest dating back to the twelfth century. The older (eighth-/ninth-century and later) Arabic versions were rediscovered by Eric John Holmyard and Julius Ruska.

=== Secret of Creation ===
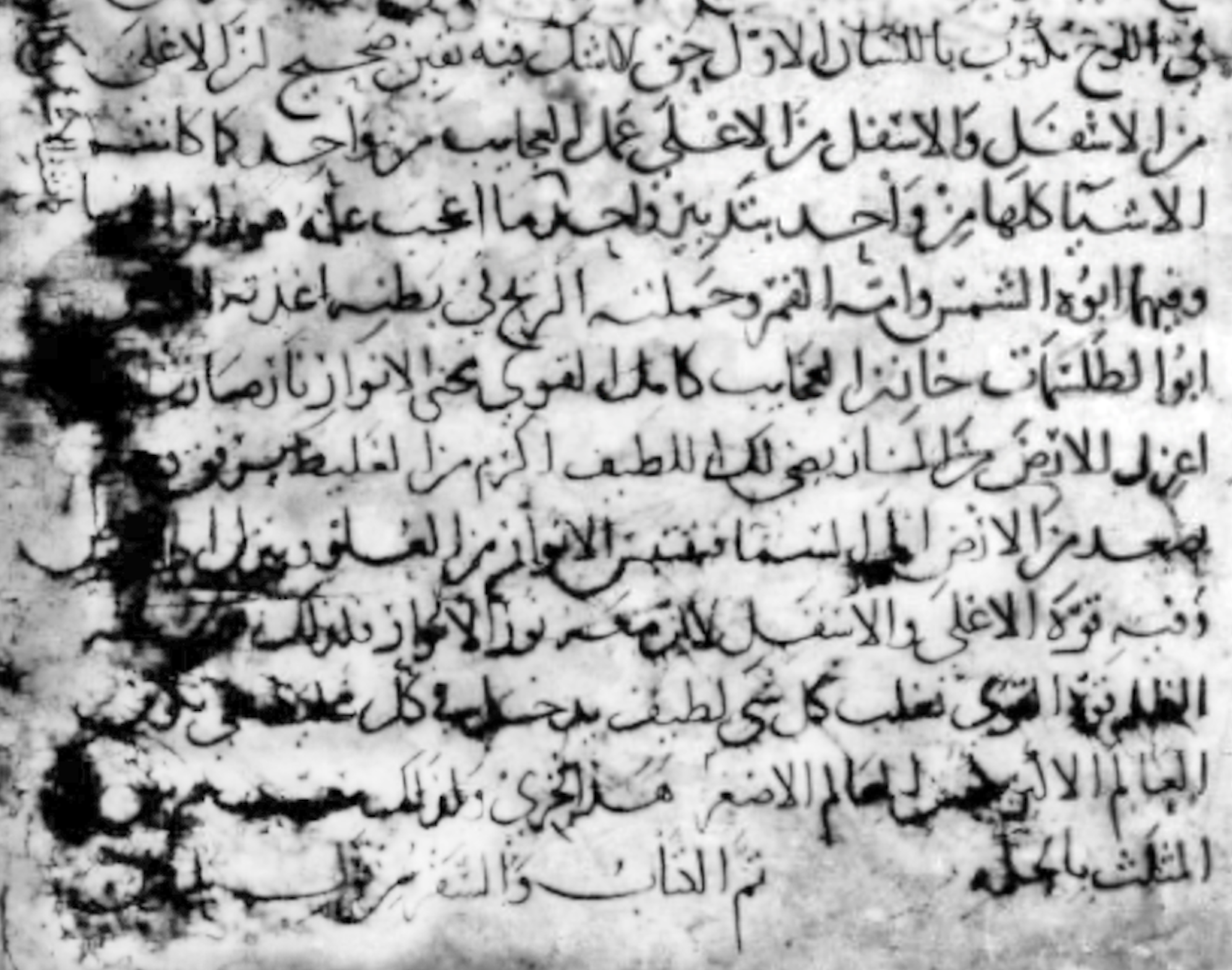
Arabic text of the Emerald Tablet from the younger recension B of Book of the Secret of Creation (man. Paris, Arabe 2300).

The oldest version of the Emerald Tablet is found as an appendix in an encyclopaedic treatise on natural philosophy meant as a cosmogony. It is believed to have been compiled in Arabic in the late eighth or early ninth century. (Note: Kraus 1943 dates this text to c. 813–833. Weisser 1980 dates it to c. 750–800. An earlier dating attempt by Ruska 1926 placed it between the sixth and eighth centuries CE.) The treatise bears the title Book of the Secret of Creation and the Craft of Nature. (Note: Arabic: كتاب سر الخليقة وصنعة الطبيعة, romanized: Kitāb Sirr al-Khalīqa wa-Ṣanʿat al-Ṭabīʿa also known as the كتاب العلل, Kitāb al-ʿilal, 'Book of Causes'.) Some scholars consider it plausible that this work is a translation of a much older Greek or Syriac original, although no such manuscript is known. At the same time others think it is more likely that it was an original Arabic composition based on older materials. The Arabic text presents itself as a translation of a work by Apollonius of Tyana. (Note: Arabised name Balīnūs (بلينوس) or Balīnās (بليناس). In some manuscripts of the Emerald Tablet he is confused with Sājiyūs (ساجيوس), a Nablusi priest who appears in the Secret of Creation as the supposed translator and commentator of Apollonius' book. Sājiyūs has sometimes been identified with the Christian Greco-Syriac translator Sergius of Reshaina (died 536 CE), but this identification is uncertain.) Pseudepigraphal attributions to Apollonius were common in medieval Arabic texts on magic, astrology, and alchemy. (Note: A list of other Arabic texts attributed to Apollonius with brief discussions may be found in Weisser 1980, pp. 28–39.) If the Tablet originally hailed from a pseudo-Apollonian context, it could be considered a text of late antiquity, like other such works.

This earliest known version reads as follows:

حقٌّ لا شكَّ فيه صَحيح،
إنّ الأعلى من الأسفل والأسفل من الأعلى،
عمل العجائب من واحد كما كانت الأشياء كلّها من واحد بتدبير واحد،
أبوه الشمس، أُمّه القمر،
حملته الريح في بطنها، غذته الأرض،
أبو الطِّلسمات، خازن العجائب، كامل القوى،
نار صارت أرضاً ٱعزِل الأرض من النار،
اللطيف أكرم من الغليظ،
برِفق وحُكم يصعد من الأرض إلى السماء وينزل إلى الأرض من السماء،
وفيه قُوّة الأعلى والأسفل،
لأنّ معه نور الأنوار فلذلك تهرب منه الظُّلمة،
قُوّة القوى
يغلب كلّ شيء لطيف، يدخل في كلّ شيء غليظ،
على تكوين العالَم الأكبر تكوّن العمل،
فهذا فَخْرِي ولذلك سُمّيتُ هرمس المثلَّث بالحكمة.

— Weisser 1979, pp. 524–525.
Translation:

(a) truth; no doubt [it] is true
indeed, the uppermost is from the lowermost and the lowermost is from the uppermost,
[it] worked the wonders from one, (just) as all things come from one by means of one plan/with one considered act,
[its] father is the sun, [its] mother is the moon,
the wind carried [it] in her womb, the earth fed [it],
father of talismans, keeper of wonders, perfect in power,
fire became earth, separate (Note: Imperative directed at a male recipient.) the earth from the fire,
the soft/delicate/gentle/subtle is more noble than the crude/rough/unintelligent/gross,
with gentle-being and wisdom [it] ascends from the earth to the heaven and descends to the earth from the heaven,
and in [it] is the power of the uppermost and the lowermost,
since with [it] is the light of lights therefore the darkness escapes (away) from [it],
power of powers
it prevails over everything soft/delicate/gentle/subtle, enters into everything crude/rough/unintelligent/gross,
against the creation of the macrocosm the work was created,
this is my renown and therefore I am named Hermes the threefold with the wisdom.

— literal translation; multiple possible meanings have been given in italics; since Arabic only has two grammatical genders and the translated pronoun is grammatically male, [it/its] can also be translated as [he/his/him]. (Note: This translation was prepared by Wikipedia editors. A translation based on the superseded edition of Ruska 1926, pp. 158–159 may also be found in Rosenthal 1975.)

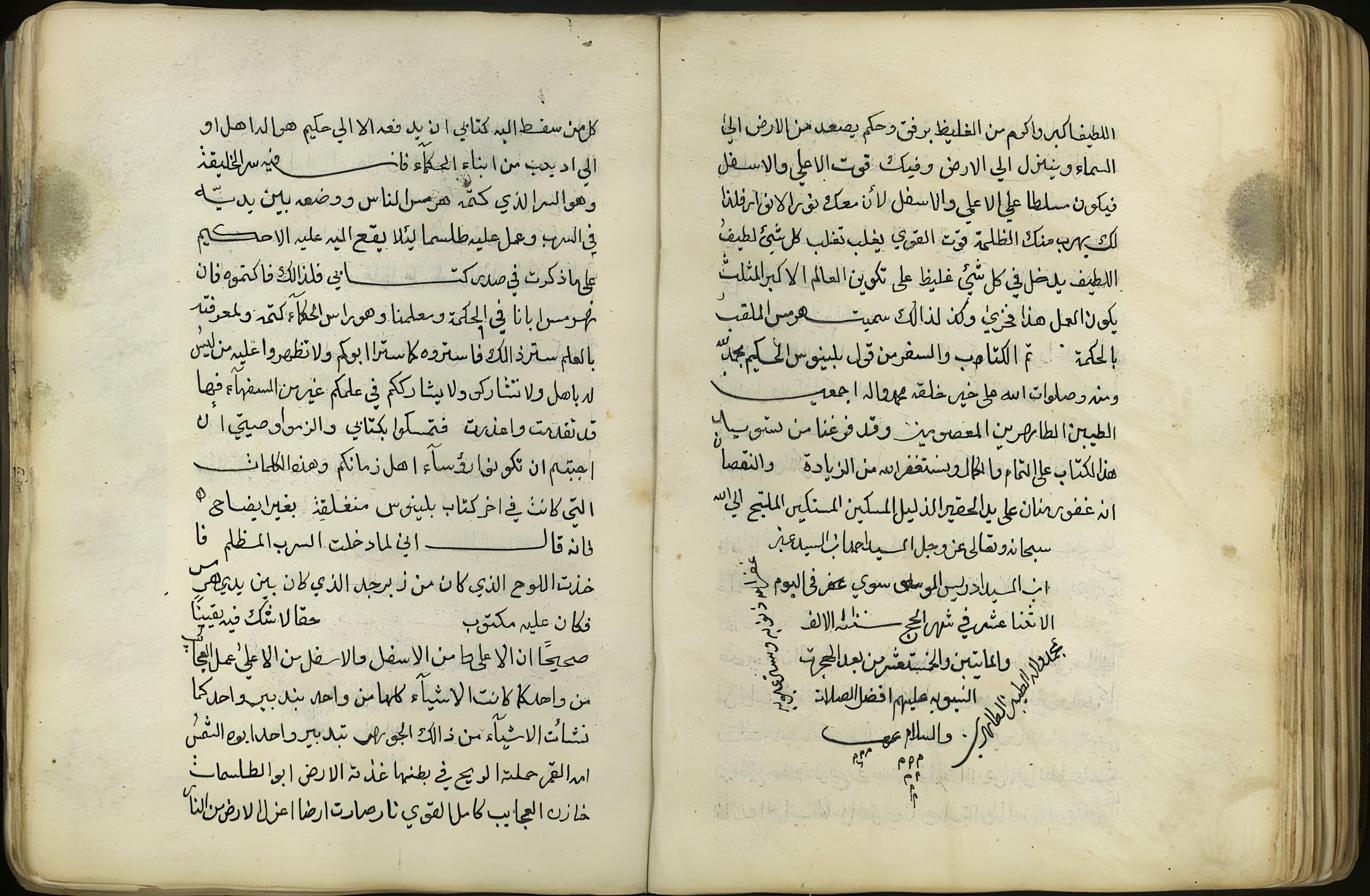
Nineteenth-century Arabic text of the Emerald Tablet and part of its frame story in the Book of the Secret of Creation. (man. Tehran, Majles Library, 14456/IR1526).

The introduction to the Book of the Secret of Creation presents a narrative that outlines key philosophical and alchemical ideas. It explains that all things are composed of four elemental qualities—heat, cold, moisture, and dryness—drawn from Aristotelian theory. These elements and their combinations are said to determine the sympathetic or antagonistic relationships between beings. In the frame story, Balīnūs, a legendary figure known as the Master of Talismans, (Note: Arabic: صاحب الطلسمات, romanized: sāḥib al-ṭilasmāt.) discovers a crypt beneath a statue of Hermes Trismegistus. Inside, he finds a tablet made of emerald, held by an old man seated with a book. (Note: "The Lineage and Cause of the Wisdom of Balīnūs Now I shall inform you of my origin and the cause of my wisdom. I was an orphan from among the people of Ṭuwāna (Arabic: طوانة), possessing nothing. In my city stood a statue of Hermes, erected upon a column of glass. Upon it was inscribed in the primordial tongue: "I am Hermes Trismegistus (Arabic: هرمس المثلث بالحكمة, romanized: Hirmis al-Muthallath bi-'l-Ḥikma). I manifested this sign openly, and veiled it through my wisdom, so that none may reach it except a sage like myself." And upon the front of the column was written: "Whosoever desires to know the Secret of Creation (Arabic: سر الخليقة, romanized: sirr al-khalīqa) and the Craft of Nature (Arabic: صنعة الطبيعة, romanized: ṣanʿa al-ṭabīʿa), let him look beneath my feet." The people paid no attention to these words and merely gazed beneath the statue's feet, yet they saw nothing. As for me, I was weak in nature, but when I grew and my nature matured, and I read the inscription on the column, I grasped its meaning. I went and stood beneath the column, and behold—I discovered a dark subterranean passage, a lair (Arabic: سرب, romanized: sarab), into which no sunlight penetrated. When I attempted to enter it, turbulent winds arose within, unceasing, so that I could not enter due to the darkness, and my flame would not remain lit because of the force of the wind. This troubled me deeply, and sorrow filled my heart. Overcome by fatigue and reflection upon my hardship, I fell asleep, burdened and distressed. Then, in my dream, I saw an old man resembling me in form and appearance. He said to me: "O Balīnūs, arise and enter this lair, that you may reach the knowledge of the Secret of Creation and perceive the Craft of Nature." I said: "I cannot see in its darkness, and my fire does not remain lit because of the wind." He replied: "O Balīnūs, place your light in a clear vessel (Arabic: إناء صاف, romanized: ināʾ ṣāfin), so that the wind may not reach it. Thus, you will see by it in the darkness." This delighted me, and I realised that I had attained my goal. I asked him: "Who are you, that you have bestowed this grace upon me?" He said: "I am your Perfect Nature (Arabic: طبيعتك التامة, romanized: ṭabīʿatuka al-tāmma)." I awoke full of joy, placed my flame in a clear vessel as instructed, and entered the passage. There I saw an old man seated upon a throne of gold. In his hand was a tablet of green emerald (Arabic: زبرجد أخضر, romanized: zabarjad akhḍar or Arabic: زمرذ أخضر, romanized: zumurrudh akhḍar), upon which was written: "This is the Craft of Nature." And in front of him lay a book bearing the inscription: "This is the Secret of Creation (Arabic: سر الخليقة, romanized: sirr al-khalīqa) and the Knowledge of the Causes of Things (Arabic: علم علل الأشياء, romanized: ʿilm ʿilal al-ashyāʾ)." I took the book and the tablet with a tranquil heart and departed from the passage. From the book, I learned the Secret of Creation, and from the tablet, I comprehended the Craft of Nature. I acquired the Science of the Causes of Things (Arabic: علم علل الأشياء, romanized: ʿilm ʿilal al-ashyāʾ), and my name rose to prominence through wisdom. I created talismans and marvels, and came to understand the temperaments of the four natures (Arabic: الطبائع الأربع, romanized: al-ṭabāʾiʿ al-arbaʿ), their compositions, their oppositions, and their harmonies.") The central part of the text is an alchemical treatise, notable for introducing—for the first time—the theory that all metals are formed from two basic substances: sulphur and mercury. This concept later became a foundational idea in medieval alchemy. Emerald was the stone traditionally associated with Hermes, while quicksilver was his metal and Mercury his planet. Mars was associated with red stones and iron, and Saturn with black stones and lead. People in antiquity thought of various green-coloured minerals—such as green jasper and even green granite—as emerald.

The text of the Emerald Tablet appears in the Book of the Secret of Creation as an appendix. It has long been debated whether it is an extraneous piece, solely cosmogonic in nature, or whether it is an integral part of the rest of the work, in which case it could have had an alchemical significance from the outset. It has been suggested that the Emerald Tablet was originally a text of talismanic magic that was only later understood as being alchemical in nature. This may have been due to it having been divorced from its original context in the Book of the Secret of Creation; and instead having been commonly transmitted through the alchemical treatise containing the vulgate.

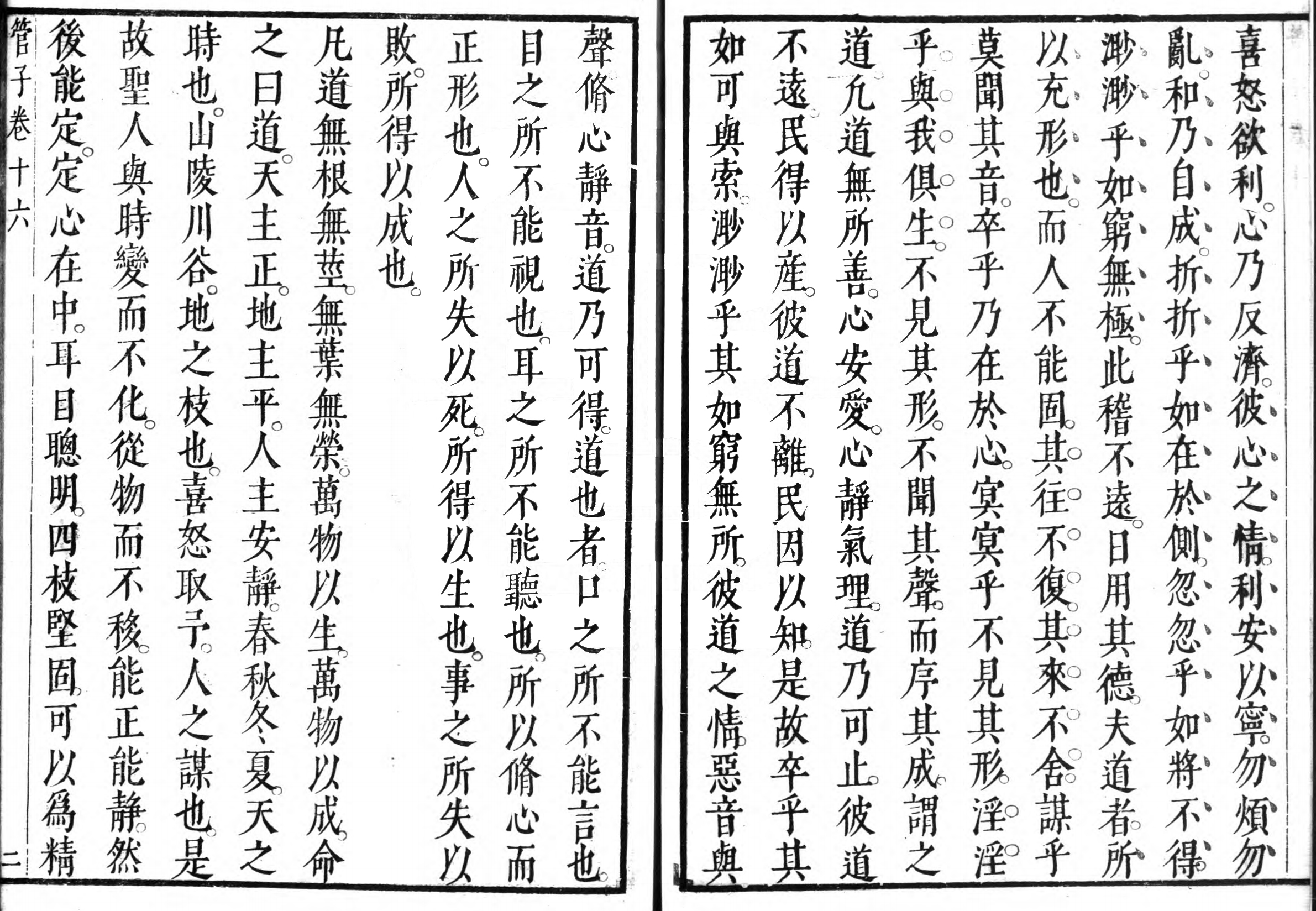
1620 woodblock print of the beginning of the Guanzi section Tzu-Kung hypothesised to be the origin of the Emerald Tablet.

Julius Ruska observed that the Tablet's cosmogony in the Book of the Secret of Creation seemed neither Islamic, Iranian, nor Christian. He speculated that it might reflect Chaldean, Harranian, or gnostic ideas from the regions northeast of Iran, along the Silk Road. (Note: Along similar lines, Wilhelm Ganzenmüller had argued that all of Arab alchemy was built on a mix of pre-Islamic traditions from north-eastern Iran and the land route to India, with other influences from gnostic Christians and ancient Egypt.) Chang Tzu-Kung proposed an origin further east—as he believed Hermes Trismegistus to have been Chinese. He noted that Chinese aphorisms commonly hailed from legendary slabs and steles in caves and temples. Tzu-Kung produced a speculative Chinese rendition of the Tablet, (Note: The crux of which is reproduced by Needham et al. 1980 using Ruska's translation.) which he based on John Read's vulgate translation. He then claimed the Tablet's origin to be a Han dynasty (202 BCE – 220 CE) Taoist text known as the Guanzi. (Note: Chinese: 管子, romanized: Guǎn Zǐ More specifically, Tzu-Kung believed to have found the origin of the Tablet in chapter 49, called 'Inward Training' (內業, Nèiyè). This section is a text of rhymed prose on ataraxy, cosmic harmony, and breathing aspects of internal alchemy. There are, however, no direct parallelisms between this text and the Tablet.) Joseph Needham rejected this theory as not yet having been sufficiently proved. (Note: However, he fundamentally agreed with the idea that the Tablet could have some relation to Chinese thought. Additionally, he suggested that other parts of the Secret of Creation might have Chinese origins, but he lacked access to the Arabic text to explore this further.)

=== Jabir ibn Hayyan ===
Another early version of the Emerald Tablet is found in the Second Book of the Element of the Foundation (Arabic: كتاب أسطقس الأسّ الثاني, romanized: Kitāb Usṭuqus al-Uss al-Thānī) attributed to the eighth-century alchemist Jabir ibn Hayyan. (Note: Commonly known in Europe by the latinised name Geber. On the dating of the texts attributed to Jābir, see Kraus 1943.) In this somewhat shorter version, lines 6, 8, and 11–15 as found in the Secret of Creation are missing. Other parts appear to be corrupt. It reads:

حقا يقينا لا شك فيه
إن الأعلى من الأسفل والأسفل من الأعلى
عمل العجائب من واحد كما كانت الأشياء كلها من واحد
وأبوه الشمس وأمه القمر
حملته الأرض في بطنها وغذته الريح في بطنها
نار صارت أرضا
اغذوا الأرض من اللطيف
بقوة القوى يصعد من الأرض إلى السماء
فيكون مسلطا على الأعلى والأسفل

— Zirnis 1979, p. 64.
Translation:

Truth! Certainty! That in which there is no doubt!
That which is above is from that which is below, and that which is below is from that which is above,
working the miracles of one [thing]. As all things were from One.
Its father is the Sun and its mother the Moon.
The Earth carried it in her belly, and the Wind nourished it in her belly,
as Earth which shall become Fire.
Feed the Earth from that which is subtle,
with the greatest power. It ascends from the earth to the heaven
and becomes ruler over that which is above and that which is below.

— Holmyard 1923.

=== Secret of Secrets ===
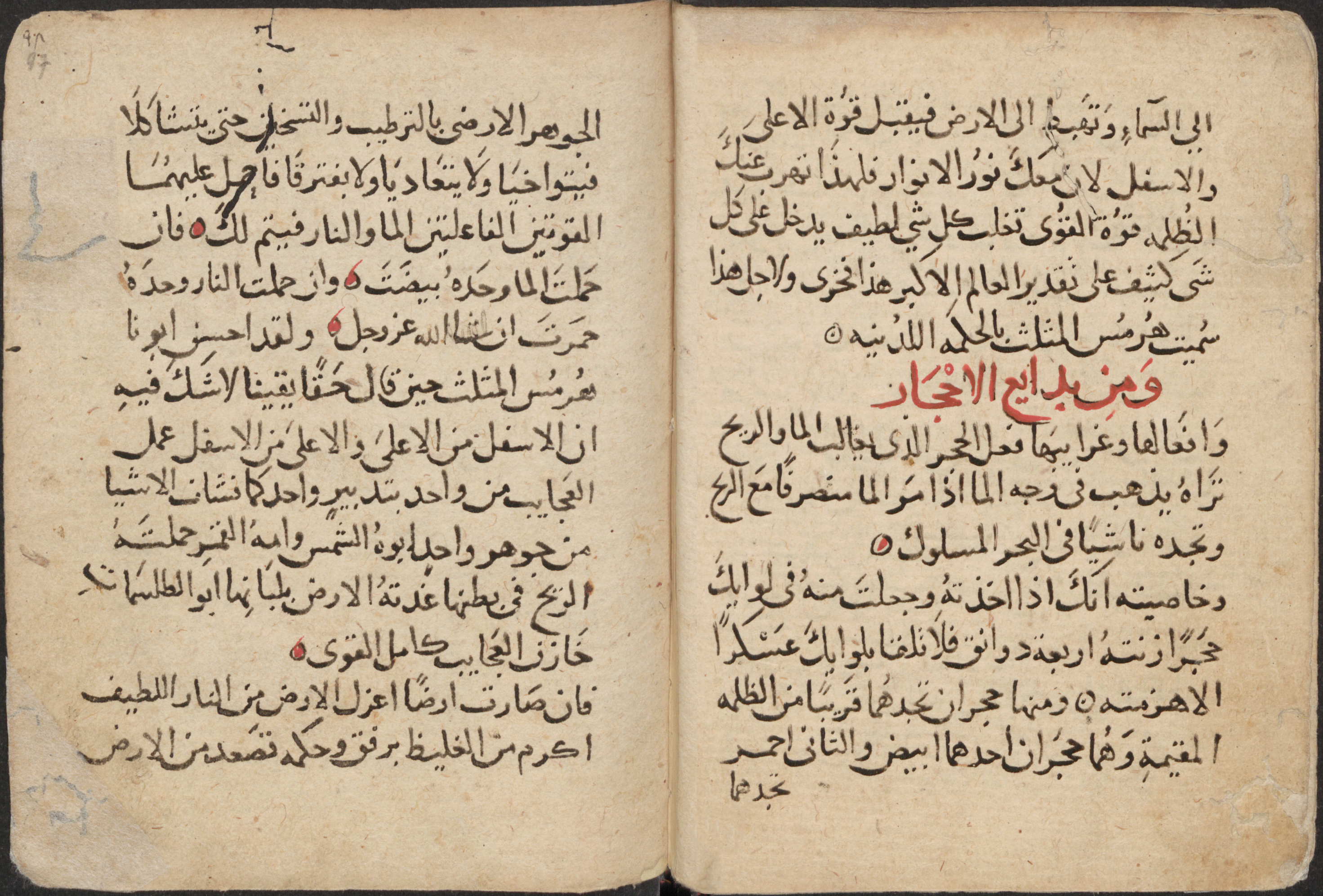
Fourteenth-century Arabic text of the Emerald Tablet from the Secret of Secrets (man. Berlin, Landberg 121).

Another text of the Emerald Tablet is found towards the end of the tenth-century pseudo-Aristotelian work known as the Secret of Secrets. (Note: Latin: Secretum Secretorum; Arabic: سرّ الأسرار, romanized: Sirr al-Asrār. Arabic text edited by Badawi 1954.) (Note: On the dating of this work, see Manzalaoui 1974.) This entire treatise is framed as a pseudepigraphical letter from Aristotle to Alexander the Great during the latter's conquest of Persia and is introduced via a number of letters between the two. (Note: Though the wording by Ibn Juljul could suggest this framing was a non-essential addition to the treatise.) It discusses politics, morality, physiognomy, astrology, alchemy, medicine, and more.

It reads:

حقا يقينا لا شك فيه
أن الأسفل من الأعلى والأعلى من الأسفل
عمل العجائب من واحد بتدبير واحد كما نشأت الأشياء من جوهر واحد
أبوه الشمس وأمه القمر
حملته الريح في بطنها، وغذته الأرض بلبانها
أبو الطلسمات، خازن العجائب، كامل القوى
فان صارت أرضا اعزل الأرض من النار اللطيف
أكرم من الغليظ
برفق وحكمة تصعد من الأرض إلى السماء وتهبط إلى الأرض
فتقبل قوة الأعلى والأسفل
لأن معك نور الأنوار فلهذا تهرب عنك الظلمة
قوة القوى
تغلب كل شيء لطيف يدخل على كل شيء كثيف
على تقدير العالم الأكبر
هذا فخري ولهذا سمّيت هرمس المثلّث بالحكمة اللدنية

=== Ibn Umayl ===
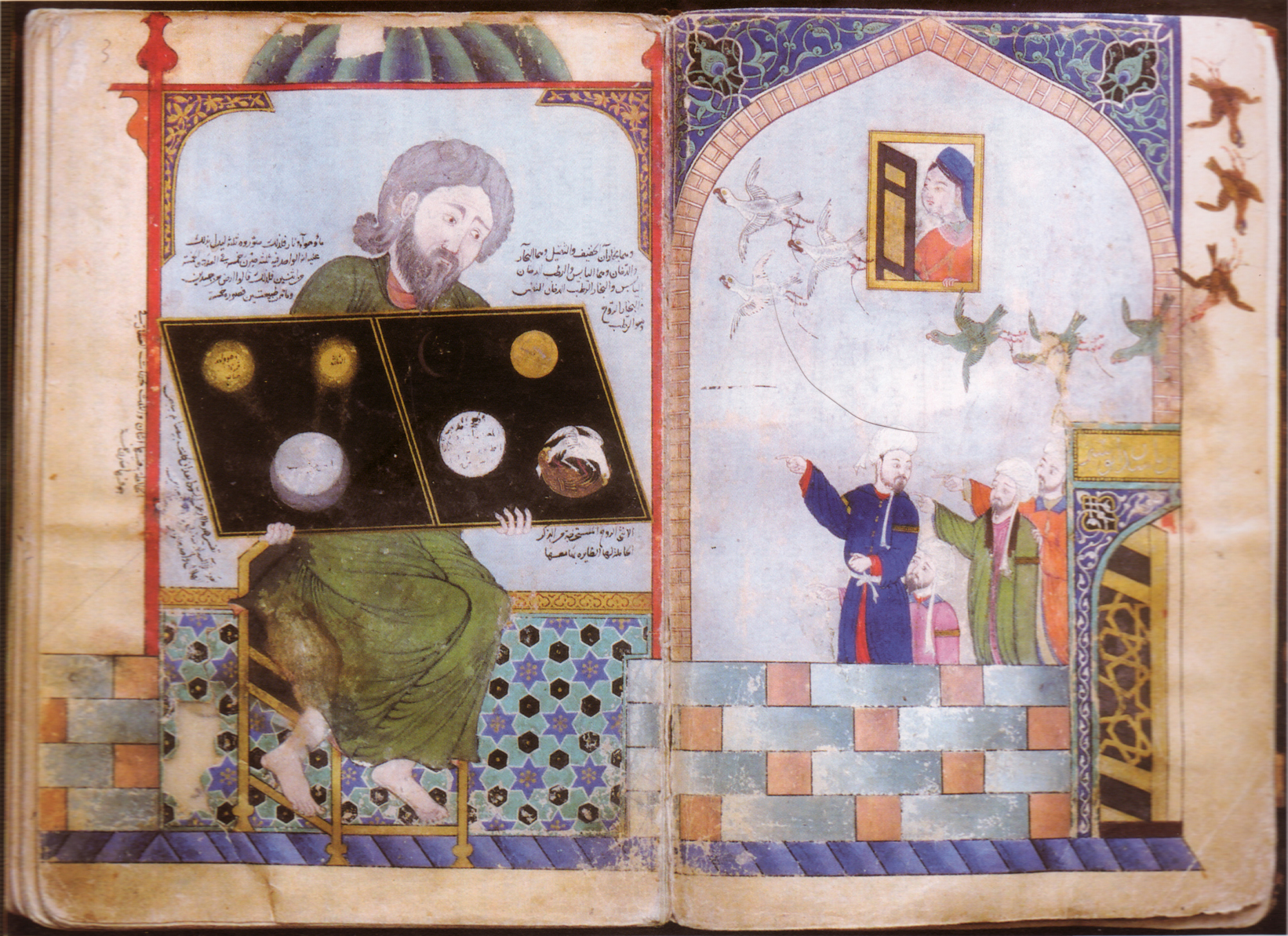
Fourteenth-century depiction of Ibn Umayl's discovery story in a pyramid from manuscript Book of the Silvery Water and the Starry Earth. (man. Topkapı Palace Library, man. Ahmet III 2075).

Similarly, an Arabic treatise called the Book of the Silvery Water and the Starry Earth (Note: Arabic: كتاب الماء الورقي والأرض النجمية, romanized: Kitāb al-Māʾ al-Waraqī wa-'l-Arḍ al-Najmiyya.) by Ibn Umayl (Note: Whose name is at time latinised to Senior Zadith.) reproduces a version of the Tablet. This treatise was translated as Latin: Tabula Chemica, lit. 'Chemical Tablet'. In this version of the frame story, an alchemical stone table is discovered, resting on the knees of Hermes Trismegistus (Note: The introduction merely calls him "the sage" but it is later stated that Hermes has many names, a few of which are listed, the first being "the sage", the same identification is made again later in the text.) in the secret chamber of a pyramid. However, this table does not contain the Tablet text which is repeated later in the treatise. It is instead inscribed with writing described as Arabic: بيرباوي, romanized: bīrbāwī, lit. 'hieroglyphic; of the pyramid'. (Note: "We went towards the Pyramid (Birbāʾ) which the keepers opened, and I saw on the roof of the galleries^{1} of the Pyramid a picture of Nine Eagles with out-spread wings, as if they were flying, and with outstretched and open claws. In the claw of each of the eagles was a thing like the fully-drawn bow which is used by soldiers (Jund: MSS. P. and L. Ḵẖail 'cavalry'). On the wall of the gallery on the right side of any one entering the Pyramid, and on the left side, were pictures of people standing, most perfect in shape and beauty, wearing clothes of various colours and having their hands stretched out towards a figure seated inside the Pyramid, near the pillar of the gate of the Hall. The image was situated to the left hand of whoever desired to enter into the Hall, facing the person who entered from the gallery. The image was (seated) in a chair, like those used by physicians, the chair being separate from the figure. In its lap, resting on the arms—the two hands of the figure being stretched out on its knees—was a stone slab (balāṭah)—also separate—the length of which was about 1 cubit, and the breadth about 1 span. The fingers of both its hands were bent behind the slab, as if holding it. The slab was like an open book, exhibited to all who entered as if to suggest that they should look at it. On the side, viz., in the Hall (riwāq) where the image was situated, were different pictures, and inscriptions in hieroglyphic (bīrbāwī) writing. The tablet which was in the lap of the image was divided into two halves by a line down the middle: and on one half of it towards the bottom, was a picture of two birds having their breasts (contiguous) to one another. One of them had both wings cut off, and the other had both wings (intact). Each of them held fast the tail of the other by its beak as if the flying bird wished to fly with the mutilated bird, and the mutilated bird wished to keep the flying bird with itself. These two linked birds that were holding one another appeared like a circle, a symbol of 'Two in One'. Above the head of the one that was flying was a circle and, above these two birds, at the top of the tablet close to the fingers of the image (sic!), was the representation of the crescent moon (hilāl). At the side of the Moon was a circle, similar to the circle near the two birds at the bottom. The total (of these symbols) is Five—3 at the bottom, viz., two birds and the circle: and, above, the figure of the Crescent Moon and another circle.") Its "hieroglyphic" contents are then visually depicted together with an alchemical exegesis thereof.

The literary theme of the discovery of Hermes' hidden wisdom can be found in other Arabic texts from around the tenth century. The introduction of the Book of Crates provides one such example. In the narrative a Greek philosopher named Crates (Note: Arabic: قراطس, romanized: Qarāṭas. Possibly a corrupted Arabic version of the name Democritus.) is praying in the temple Sarapieion. (Note: Arabic: ساراوندين, romanized: Sārāwandīn. Faivre 1988 and Houdas 1893 merely translate this to mean the Temple of Serapis. But Ruska points out that Sārāwandīn is the Arabised version of Sarapieion and that Arabic: سَرافِيل, romanized: Sarāfīl is the Arabised version of Serapis—with the particle īl being reminiscent of the Arabisation of Hebrew angel names like Arabic: جبريل, romanized: Jibrīl, lit. 'Gabriel'.) While in prayer he has a vision of the ancient sage. It reads:

"Then I saw an old man, the most beautiful of men, seated on a chair. He was dressed in white garments and held in his hand a board attached to the chair, upon which rested a book. Before him were wondrous vessels, the most marvellous I had ever seen. When I asked who this old man was, I was told: He is Hermes Trismegistus, and the book before him is one of those that contain the explanation of the secrets he concealed from humankind."

== European medieval period ==
=== On the Secrets of Nature ===
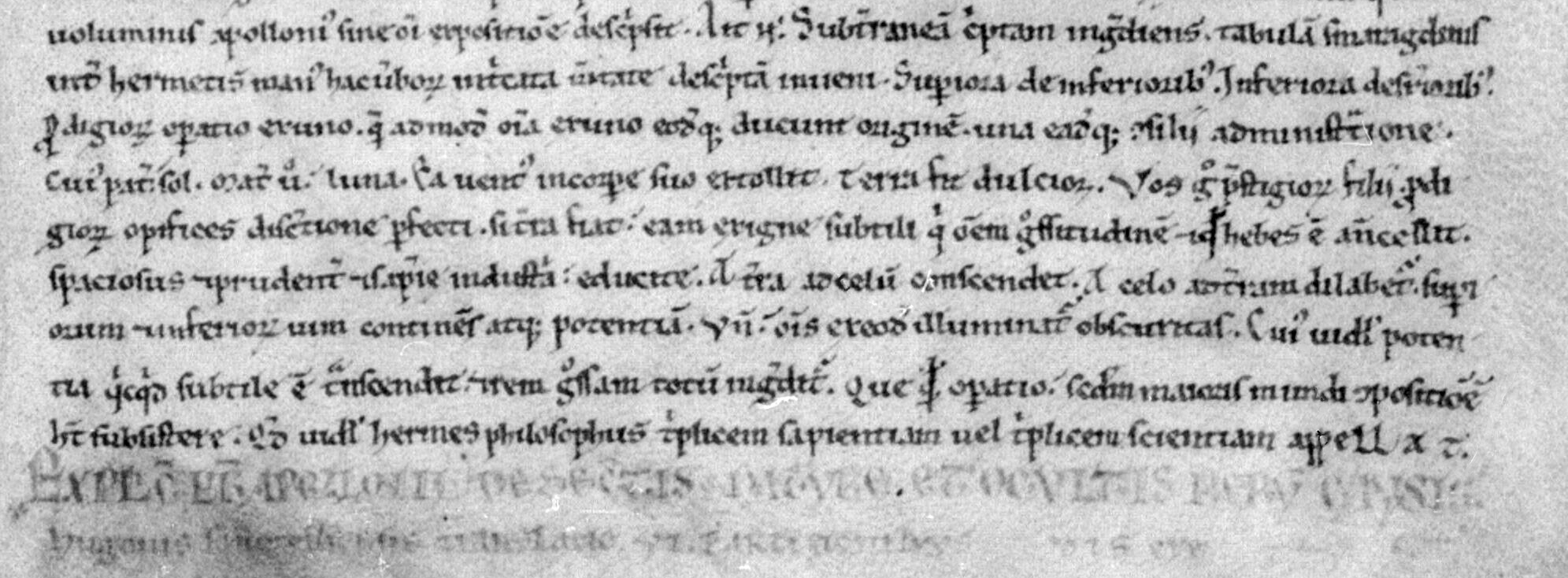
Text of the Emerald Tablet in its Latin translation by Hugo of Santalla (man. Paris, Latin 13951).

The Book of the Secret of Creation was translated into Latin (Note: Titled Latin: Liber de secretis naturae, lit. 'Book of the Secrets of Nature'; An edition of the text was published by Françoise Hudry.) in c. 1145–1151 by Hugo of Santalla. (Note: A Latin edition of this text can be found in Hudry 1997–1999 (review by Mandosio 2004a). Hudry's version of the Tablet is reproduced in Mandosio 2004b. An English translation of this text may be found in Litwa 2018.) This text does not appear to have been widely circulated. Its translation of the Tablet reads as follows:

Superiora de inferioribus, inferiora de superioribus,
prodigiorum operatio ex uno, quemadmodum omnia ex uno eodemque ducunt originem, una eademque consilii administratione.
Cuius pater Sol, mater vero Luna,
eam ventus in corpore suo extollit: Terra fit dulcior.
Vos ergo, prestigiorum filii, prodigiorum opifices, discretione perfecti,
si terra fiat, eam ex igne subtili, qui omnem grossitudinem et quod hebes est antecellit, spatiosibus, et prudenter et sapientie industria, educite.
A terra ad celum conscendet, a celo ad terram dilabetur,
superiorum et inferiorum vim continens atque potentiam.
Unde omnis ex eodem illuminatur obscuritas,
cuius videlicet potentia quicquid subtile est transcendit et rem grossam, totum, ingreditur.
Que quidem operatio secundum maioris mundi compositionem habet subsistere.
Quod videlicet Hermes philosophus triplicem sapientiam vel triplicem scientiam appellat. (Note: Hudry's edition is reproduced in Mandosio 2004b, pp. 690–691. An English translation may be found in Litwa 2018.)

=== Secret of Secrets ===
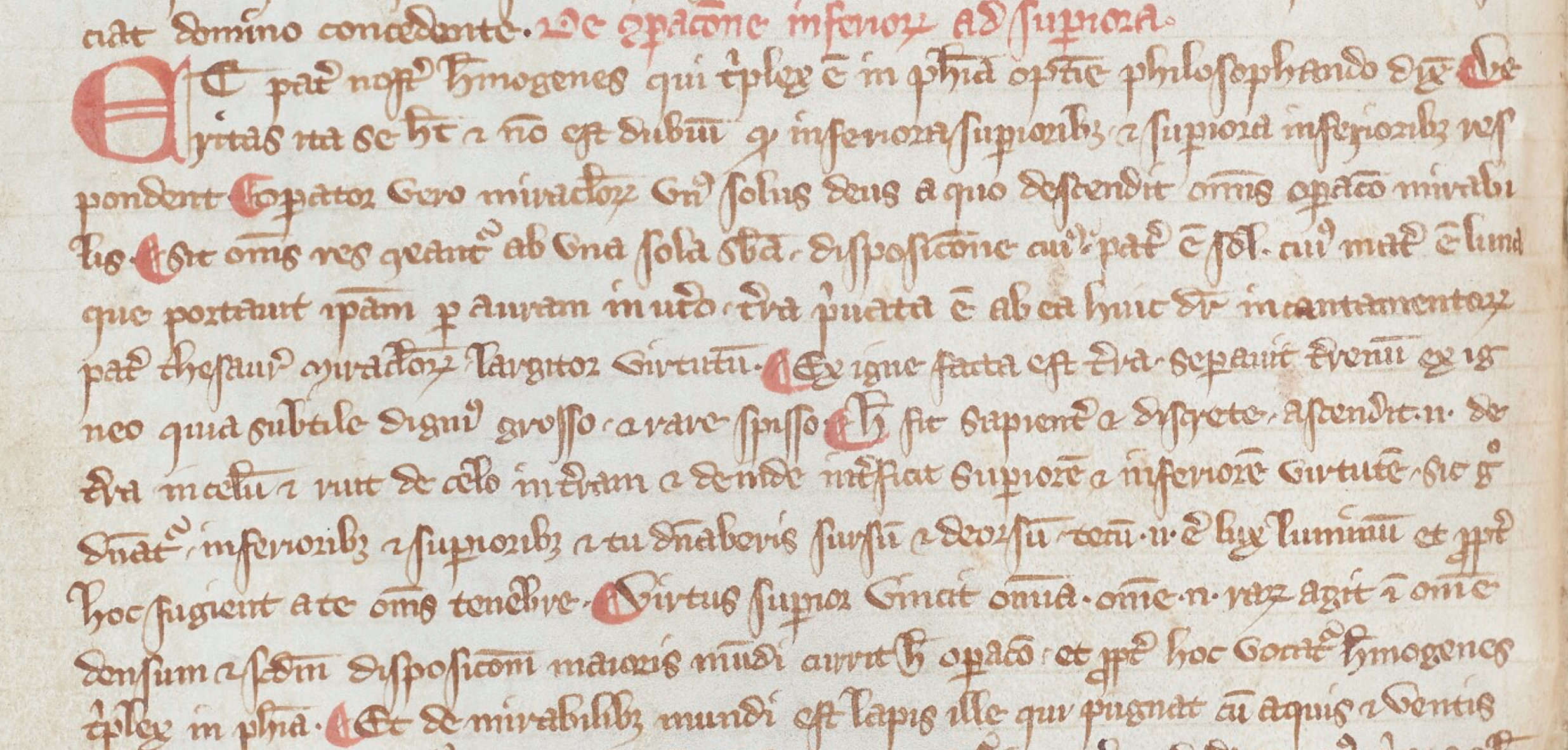
Latin text of the Tablet in the Secret of Secrets from c. 1290–1320 (man. Oxford, Christ Church 99).

The Tablet was also translated into Latin as part of the thirteenth-century translation of the Secret of Secrets (Latin: Secretum Secretorum) by Philip of Tripoli. This entire treatise has been called "the most popular book of the Latin Middle Ages". (Note: A Latin edition of the text can be found in Steele 1920. Steele's edition is reproduced in Mandosio 2004b.) Its translation of the Tablet differs significantly from both Hugo of Santalla's version and the vulgate translation. In Roger Bacon's 1255 edition it reads:

Veritas ita se habet et non est dubium,
quod inferiora superioribus et superiora inferioribus respondent.
Operator miraculorum unus solus est Deus, a quo descendit omnis operacio mirabilis.
Sic omnes res generantur ab una sola substancia, una sua sola disposicione.
Quarum pater est Sol, quarum mater est Luna.
Que portavit ipsam naturam per auram in utero, terra impregnata est ab ea.
Hinc dicitur Sol causatorum pater, thesaurus miraculorum, largitor virtutum.
Ex igne facta est terra.
Separa terrenum ab igneo, quia subtile dignius est grosso, et rarum spisso.
Hoc fit sapienter et discrete. Ascendit enim de terra in celum, et ruit de celo in terram.
Et inde interficit superiorem et inferiorem virtutem.
Sic ergo dominatur inferioribus et superioribus et tu dominaberis sursum et deorsum,
tecum enim est lux luminum, et propter hoc fugient a te omnes tenebre.
Virtus superior vincit omnia.
Omne enim rarum agit in omne densum.
Et secundum disposicionem majoris mundi currit hec operacio,
et propter hoc vocatur Hermogenes triplex in philosophia.

=== Vulgate ===
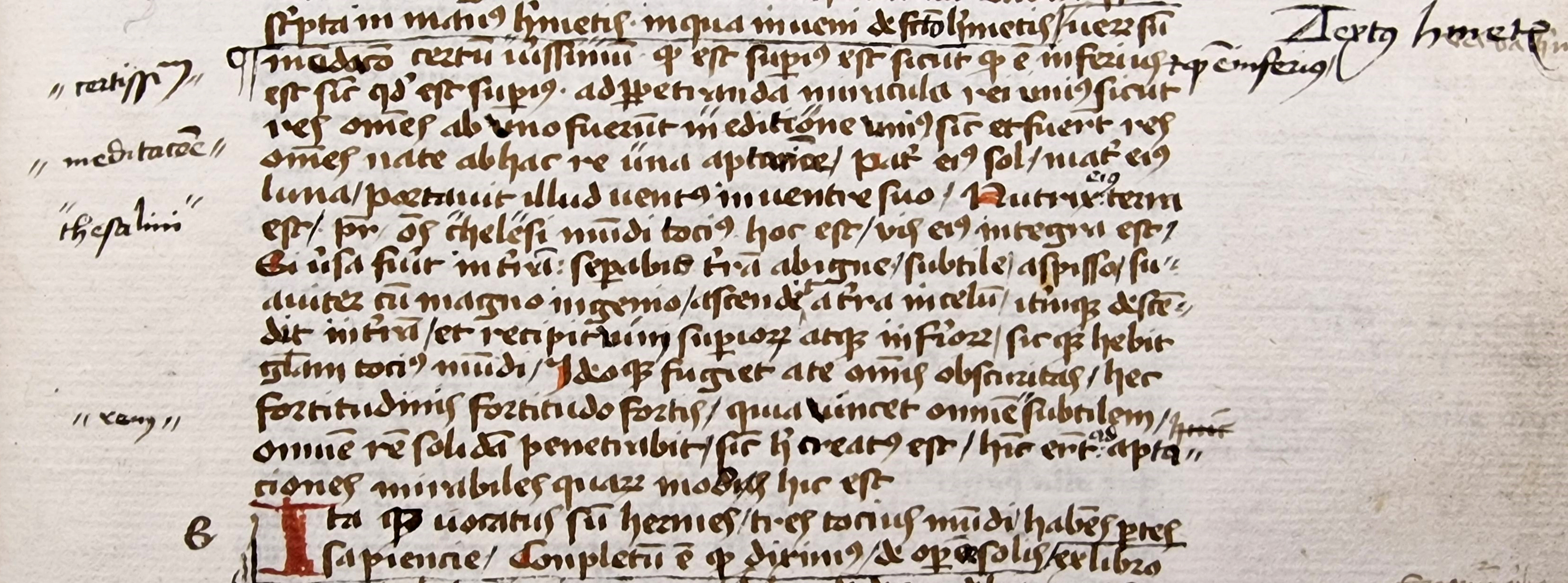
Fifteenth-century Latin text of the vulgate Emerald Tablet (man. British Library, Arundel 164, folio 155r).

A third Latin version can be found in an alchemical treatise likely from the twelfth century. (Note: Although there are no extant manuscripts before the thirteenth or fourteenth century.) This latter, most circulated version is called the vulgate, as it was widespread and formed the subsequent basis for all later editions and translations into European vernacular languages. (Note: Or in Latin: vulgata.) It is found in an anonymous compilation of commentaries on the Emerald Tablet, translated from a lost Arabic text–variously called the Book of Hermes on Alchemy, (Note: Latin: Liber Hermetis de alchimia.) the Book of Dabessus, (Note: Latin: Liber dabessi.) or the Book of the Rebis. (Note: Latin: Liber rebis.) Its translator has been tentatively identified as Plato of Tivoli, who was active in c. 1134–1145. (Note: Plato of Tivoli collaborated with Abraham bar Ḥiyya. One reason given for this speculative identification by Steele & Singer 1927 is the presence of Hebraised names in the text.) However, this is merely conjecture, and although it can be deduced from other indices that the text dates to the first half of the twelfth century, its translator remains unknown. (Note: For further information about this text see Colinet 1995 and Caiazzo 2004, pp. 700–703.)

Its translation of the Tablet reads: (Note: Extant manuscripts are listed in Steele & Singer 1927. Their edition of the Tablet itself is reproduced in Mandosio 2004b. A transcription of the Tablet from the manuscript Arundel 164 is given by Selwood 2023—who erroneously believes Steele & Singer 1927's edition to be a mere transcript of a singular manuscript; his attribution of the text's origin to the Secret of Secrets is likewise incorrect.)

Verum sine mendacio, certum, certissimum.
Quod est superius est sicut quod inferius, et quod inferius est sicut quod est superius.
Ad preparanda miracula rei unius.
Sicut res omnes ab una fuerunt meditatione unius, et sic sunt nate res omnes ab hac re una aptatione.
Pater ejus sol, mater ejus luna.
Portavit illuc ventus in ventre suo. Nutrix ejus terra est.
Pater omnis Telesmi tocius mundi hic est.
Vis ejus integra est.
Si versa fuerit in terram separabit terram ab igne, subtile a spisso.
Suaviter cum magno ingenio ascendit a terra in celum. Iterum descendit in terram,
et recipit vim superiorem atque inferiorem.
Sicque habebis gloriam claritatis mundi. Ideo fugiet a te omnis obscuritas.
Hic est tocius fortitudinis fortitudo fortis,
quia vincet omnem rem subtilem, omnemque rem solidam penetrabit.
Sicut hic mundus creatus est.
Hinc erunt aptationes mirabiles quarum mos hic est.
Itaque vocatus sum Hermes, tres tocius mundi partes habens sapientie.
Et completum est quod diximus de opere solis ex libro Galieni Alfachimi.

— Steele & Singer 1927, p. 48/492.
Translation:

True it is, without falsehood, certain and most true.
That which is above is like to that which is below, and that which is below is like to that which is above,
to accomplish the miracles of one thing.
And as all things were by contemplation of one, so all things arose from this one thing by a single act of adaptation.
The father thereof is the Sun, the mother the Moon.
The wind carried it in its womb, the earth is the nurse thereof.
It is the father of all works of wonder throughout the whole world.
The power thereof is perfect.
If it be cast on to earth, it will separate the element of earth from that of fire, the subtle from the gross.
With great sagacity it doth ascend gently from earth to heaven. Again it doth descend to earth,
and uniteth in itself the force from things superior and things inferior.
Thus thou wilt possess the glory of the brightness of the whole world, and all obscurity will fly far from thee.
This thing is the strong fortitude of all strength,
for it overcometh every subtle thing and doth penetrate every solid substance.
Thus was this world created.
Hence will there be marvellous adaptations achieved, of which the manner is this.
For this reason I am called Hermes Trismegistus, because I hold three parts of the wisdom of the whole world.
That which I had to say about the operation of Sol is completed.

— Steele & Singer 1927, p. 42/486.

The translator of this version did not understand the Arabic: طلسم, romanized: ṭilasm, lit. 'enigma; talisman' and therefore merely transcribed it into Latin as telesmus or telesmum. This accidental neologism was variously interpreted by commentators, thereby becoming one of the most distinctive, yet ambiguous, terms of alchemy. The word is of Greek origin, from Ancient Greek: τελεσμός, romanized: telesmos. (Note: Itself from Ancient Greek: τελέω, romanized: teleō, lit. 'to perform; accomplish; consecrate; initiate'.) The obscurity of this word's meaning brought forth many interpretations. In the Book of Hermes on Alchemy the cryptic telesmus line was left out entirely. The vulgate's final line referring to the operation of Sol is commonly interpreted as a reference to the alchemical Great Work. The Emerald Tablet was seen as a summary of alchemical principles, wherein the secrets of the philosopher's stone were thought to have been described. This belief led to its consequent popularity and the wide array of European translations of and commentaries on the text, beginning in the High Middle Ages and persisting to the present.

=== Commentaries ===
Herman of Carinthia was one of a few European twelfth-century scholars to cite the Emerald Tablet. He did so in his 1143 treatise On Essences, (Note: Latin: De essentiis.) where he also recalled the frame story of the tablet's discovery under a statue of Hermes in a cave, from the Book of the Secret of Creation. Carinthia was a friend of Robert of Chester, who in 1144 translated the Book on the Composition of Alchemy, which is generally considered to be the first Latin translation of an Arabic treatise on alchemy. An anonymous twelfth-century commentator tried to explain the aforementioned neologism telesmus in the phrase Latin: Pater omnis telesmi, lit. 'Father of all telesms' by claiming it is synonymous with Latin: Pater omnis secreti, lit. 'Father of everything secret'. The translator followed this claim with the assertion that a kind of divination, which is "superior to all others" among the Arabs is called Latin: Thelesmus. (Note: "Th"-initial spellings represent a corruption.) In subsequent commentaries on the Emerald Tablet only the meaning of secret was retained. On Minerals (Note: Latin: De mineralibus.) written around 1250 by Albertus Magnus comments on the vulgate (Note: Which he mistakenly identifies as from the Latin: secretum secrelissimorum ie the Secret of Secrets.) Tablet. Roger Bacon translated and annotated the Secret of Secrets around 1275–1280. He thought it an authentic work of Aristotle and it greatly influenced his thought. (Note: Particularly his belief in astrology and natural magic.) He cited it constantly, from his earliest writings to his last. The most widespread commentary accompanying the text of the Emerald Tablet is that of Hortulanus. He was an alchemist, who was likely active in the first half of the fourteenth century, about whom very little is known except for what he states about himself in the introduction of the text. (Note: "I, called Hortulanus, named from the horti maritimi [incomprehensible term, later variants change it to named from the garden or from the seaside field], wrapped in Jacobin skin, unworthy to be called a disciple of philosophy. Moved by the love of my dear one. The most certain declaration of the speech of the father of philosophers, Hermes, I intend to speak. Which speech, although it may be hidden, nevertheless the exercise of the true work, in the fatigue of my fingers, has most truly declared the whole exposition. For the concealment of the philosophers in speeches profits nothing, where the doctrine of the Holy Spirit operates.") Hortulanus, like Albertus Magnus before him, saw the tablet as a cryptic recipe that described laboratory processes using "deck names". This was the dominant view held by Europeans until the fifteenth century. In his commentary, Hortulanus, again like Albertus Magnus, interpreted the sun and moon to represent alchemical gold and silver. (Note: Ruska 1926 points out that this passage and interpretation bear great resemblance to a much earlier Hermetic work transmitted in Greek by Zosimos of Panopolis.) Hortulanus translated "telesma" as "secret" or "treasure". (Note: "It is written afterward: Pater omnis telesmi totius mundi est hic — that is to say, in the work of the Stone is found the final path. And note that the Philosopher calls the operation "father of all telesma," that is to say, of every secret or of all the treasure of the entire world — that is, of every stone discovered in this world. It is here. As if he were saying: behold, I show it to you.")

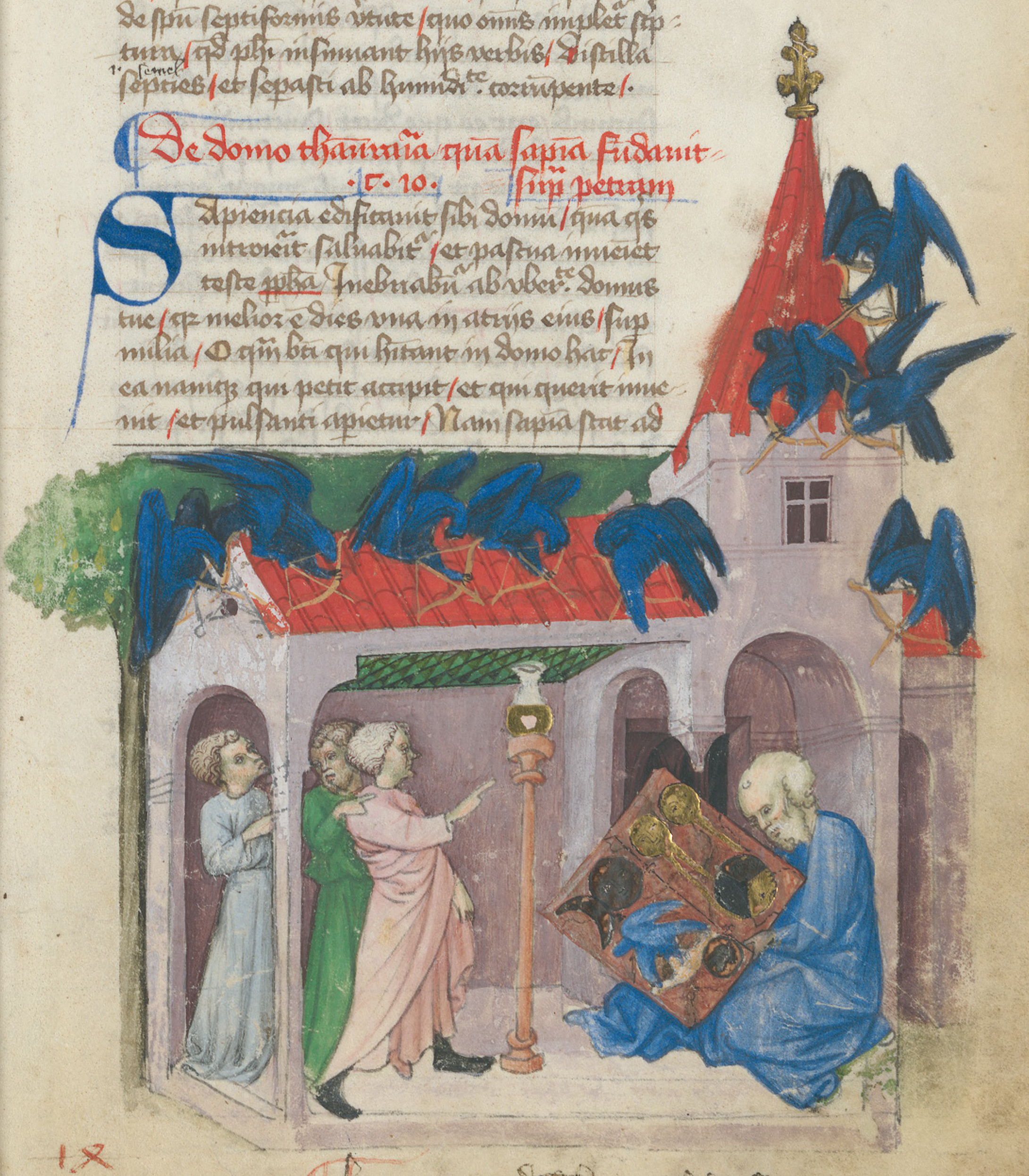
Discovery of the Emerald Tablet in a Pyramid shown in the Rising Dawn.

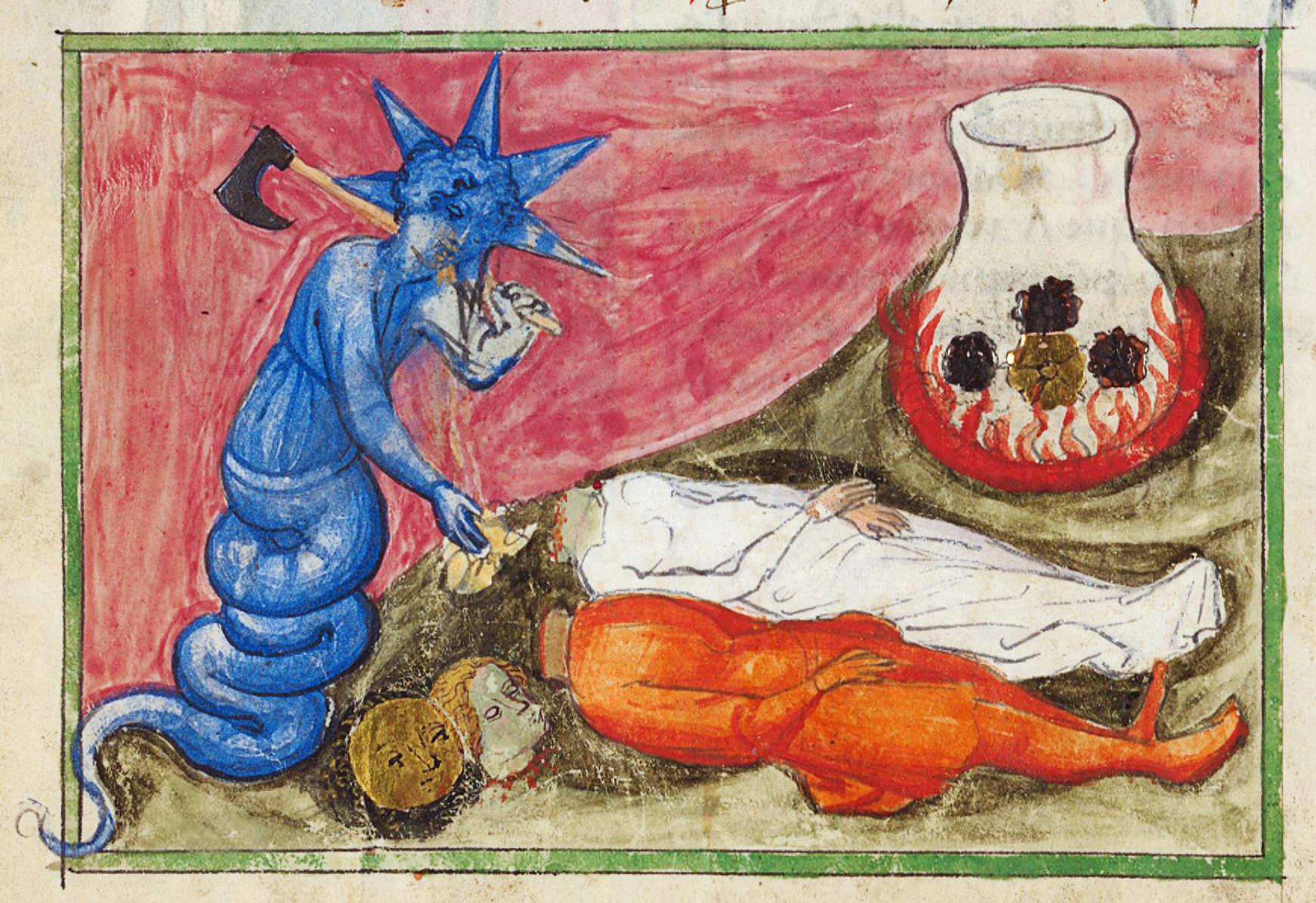
A serpentine Mercury beheads the Sun and Moon; golden and silver blossoms sit in a glass vessel over a flame. From the same manuscript (Zurich, Rheinau 172).

From around 1420, the Rising Dawn (Note: Latin: Aurora consurgens.) introduced one of the earliest European cycles of alchemical imagery, combining complex metaphors with the motif of glass vessels. Its illustrations depict symbolic operations such as putrefaction, sublimation, and the union of opposites through figures like Mercury, the sun and moon, dragons, and eagles. These images reflect philosophical principles including "two are one" and "nature vanquishes nature". Drawing on late antique traditions preserved in Ibn Umayl's Book of the Silvery Water and the Starry Earth, the manuscript visualises the myth of the rediscovery of Hermetic knowledge, portraying hieroglyphic signs as divinely instituted symbols immune to verbal distortion. The Rising Dawn thus helped establish the Renaissance notion of alchemical imagery as a medium for transmitting original wisdom through visual, rather than textual, means.

== Renaissance and early modernity ==
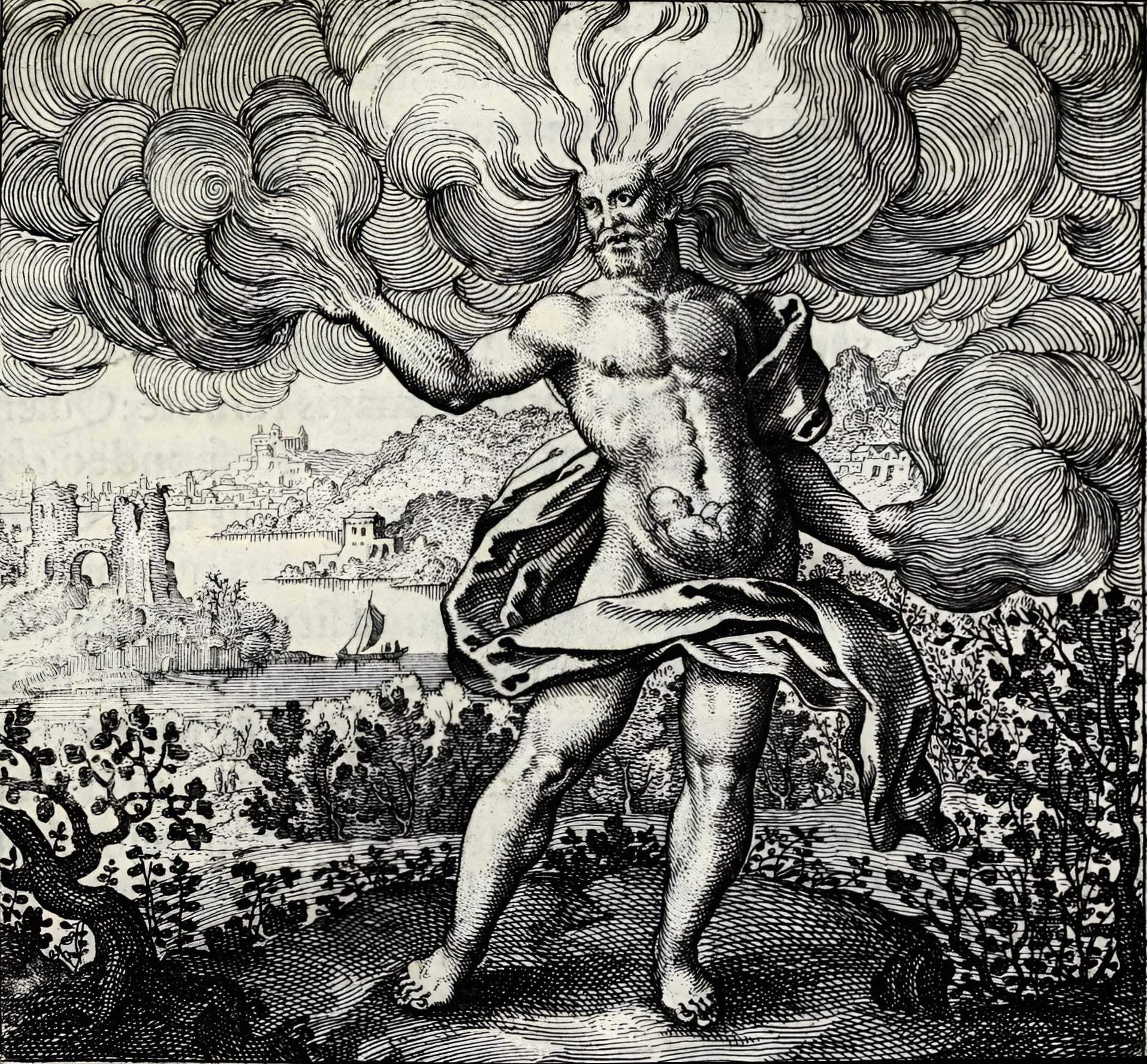
First alchemical emblem from Fleeing Atalanta: the wind hath carried it in its belly.

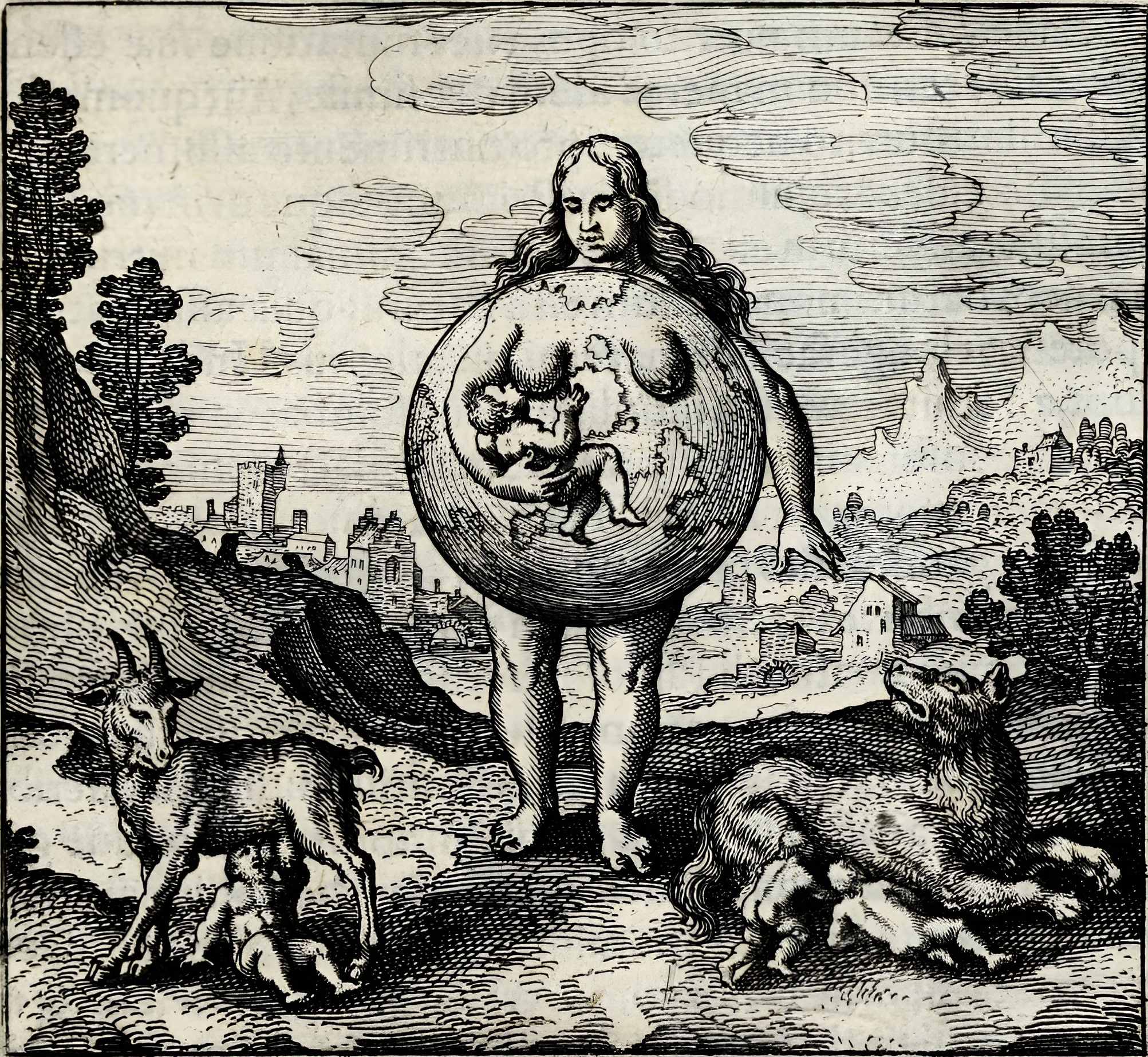
Second alchemical emblem: the earth is its nurse.

During the Renaissance, Hermes Trismegistus was widely regarded as the founder of alchemy and native to Babylon. He was thought to be a contemporary of Noah or Moses and his legend became intertwined with biblical narratives. One illustrative example of the belief that Hermes invented alchemy is found in the anonymous text Who Were the First Inventors of this Art, (Note: Latin: Qui fuerint primi inventores hujus artis.) extracted from a gloss of the fourteenth-century Textus Alkimie. (Note: "Now the very first inventor of this science—or of the mechanical alchemical art, as one reads in several of his own books—was HERMES, who was surnamed Triplex. And this was so because in the threefold philosophy—namely in the mineral, the vegetable, and the animal—he was highest and most perfect in this art of archimia, whether conjointly or separately in the Operation of the Sun. Who, under another name and according to some, is called HERMES TRISMEGISTUS. And therefore he is called Trismegistus, because among these three—namely fluency (Latin: facundia), eloquence (Latin: eloquentia), and knowledge (Latin: scientia)—he was above all others in his day most eminent and perfect. And this same one—because he was the very first inventor of this alchemical art—is continually called Latin: PATER NOSTER, lit. 'OUR FATHER'.") This text or a later French one, incorporating much of its narrative, influenced another discovery legend claiming the tablet (and its emblem) to have been discovered after the Biblical Flood in Hebron Valley.

The narrative further evolved via Hieronymus Torrella's 1496 Splendid Work of Astrological Images. (Note: Latin: Opus praeclarum de imaginibus astrologicis.) In it, Alexander the Great discovers a Latin: tabula zaradi, lit. 'zaradi tablet' (Note: Or in the work attributed to Albertus Magnus Latin: tabula zatadi, lit. 'zatadi tablet'. Meaning a tablet made of emerald but merely transliterating the Arabic: زبرجدي, romanized: zabarjadī, lit. '(made of) emerald; peridot'.) in Hermes' tomb while travelling to the Oracle of Amun in Egypt. This story is repeated in 1617 by Michael Maier in Symbols of the Golden Table, (Note: Latin: Symbola Aureae Mensae.) referencing a Book of Chymical Secrets (Note: Latin: Liber de secretis chymicis.) attributed to, but likely not written by, Albertus Magnus. That same year, he published Fleeing Atalanta. (Note: Latin: Atalanta Fugiens.) It was illustrated by Matthaeus Merian the Elder, possibly with cooperation from his cousin Theodor de Bry, (Note: The current scientific consensus favours Matthaeus Merian as the sole author. A seventeenth-century text by Stanislas Klossowski de Rola asserts de Bry however, leading Godwin 2007 to suggest that, if the busy de Bry had any role to play in the creation of the engravings, it most likely would have been the figures.) with fifty alchemical emblems, each accompanied by a poem, the score of a fugue, and alchemical and mythological explanations. Among them were ones depicting verses from the Tablet.

The first printed edition of the Emerald Tablet appeared in 1541, in Of Alchemy. (Note: Latin: De alchemia.) It was published in Nuremberg by Johann Petreius and edited by a certain Chrysogonus Polydorus. Polydorus likely is a pseudonym used by the Lutheran theologian Andreas Osiander, who edited Copernicus' On the Revolutions of the Heavenly Spheres in 1543, also published by Petreius. This edition, which is similar to the vulgate version, is accompanied by Hortulanus' commentary.

By the early sixteenth century, the writings of Johannes Trithemius marked a shift away from a laboratory interpretation of the Emerald Tablet, to a metaphysical approach. Trithemius equated Hermes' "one thing" with the monad of Pythagorean philosophy and the anima mundi. This interpretation of the Hermetic text was adopted by alchemists such as John Dee, Heinrich Cornelius Agrippa, and Gerhard Dorn. In 1583, Dorn published On the Light of Physical Nature (Note: Latin: De luce naturae physica.) by Christoph Corvinus. This Paracelsian treatise drew up a detailed parallel between the Emerald Tablet and the Genesis creation narrative.

=== Emblem ===
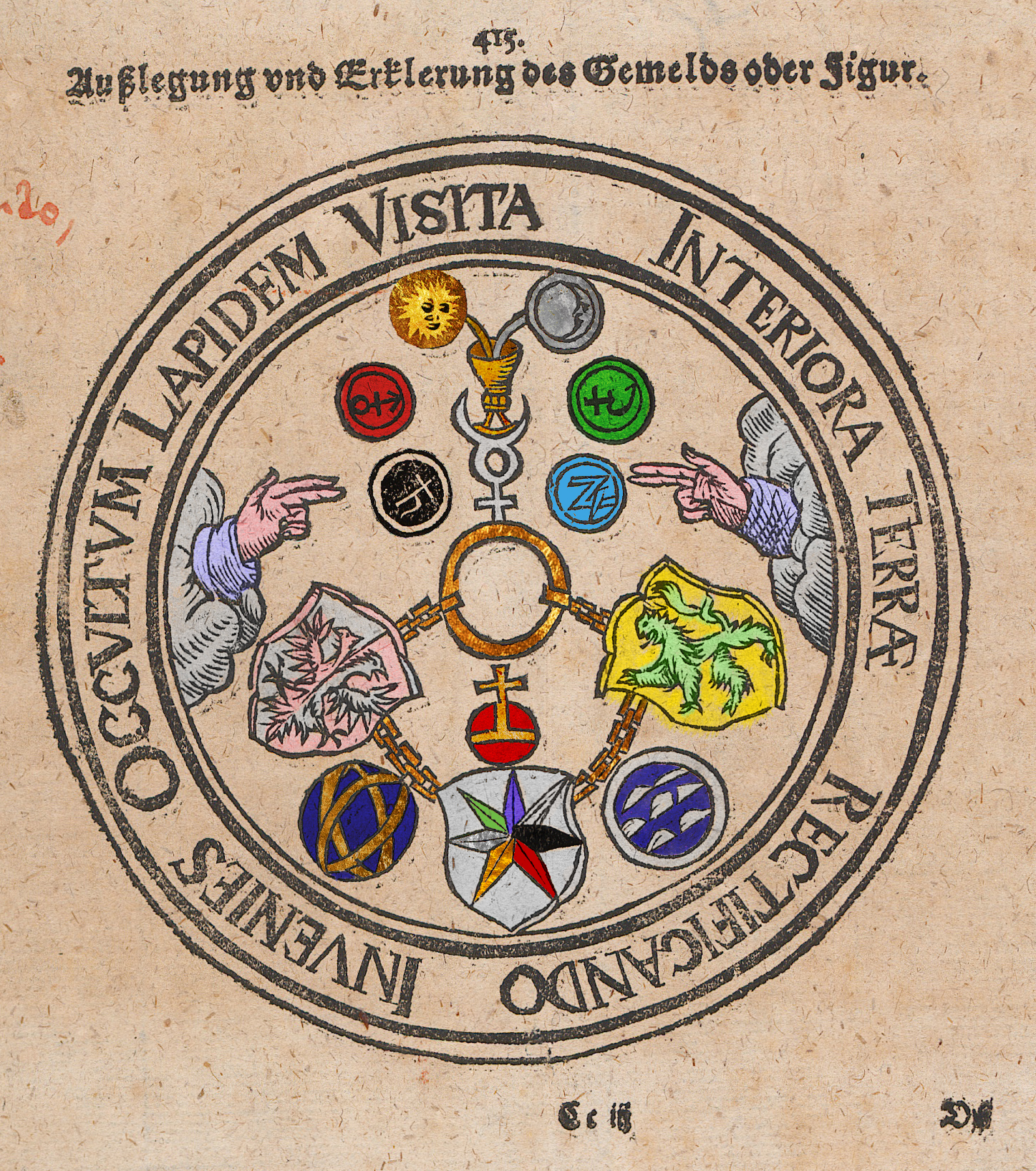
Emblem of the Emerald Tablet from a 1600 edition of the Golden Fleece. Colour restored per Telle 1984's description.

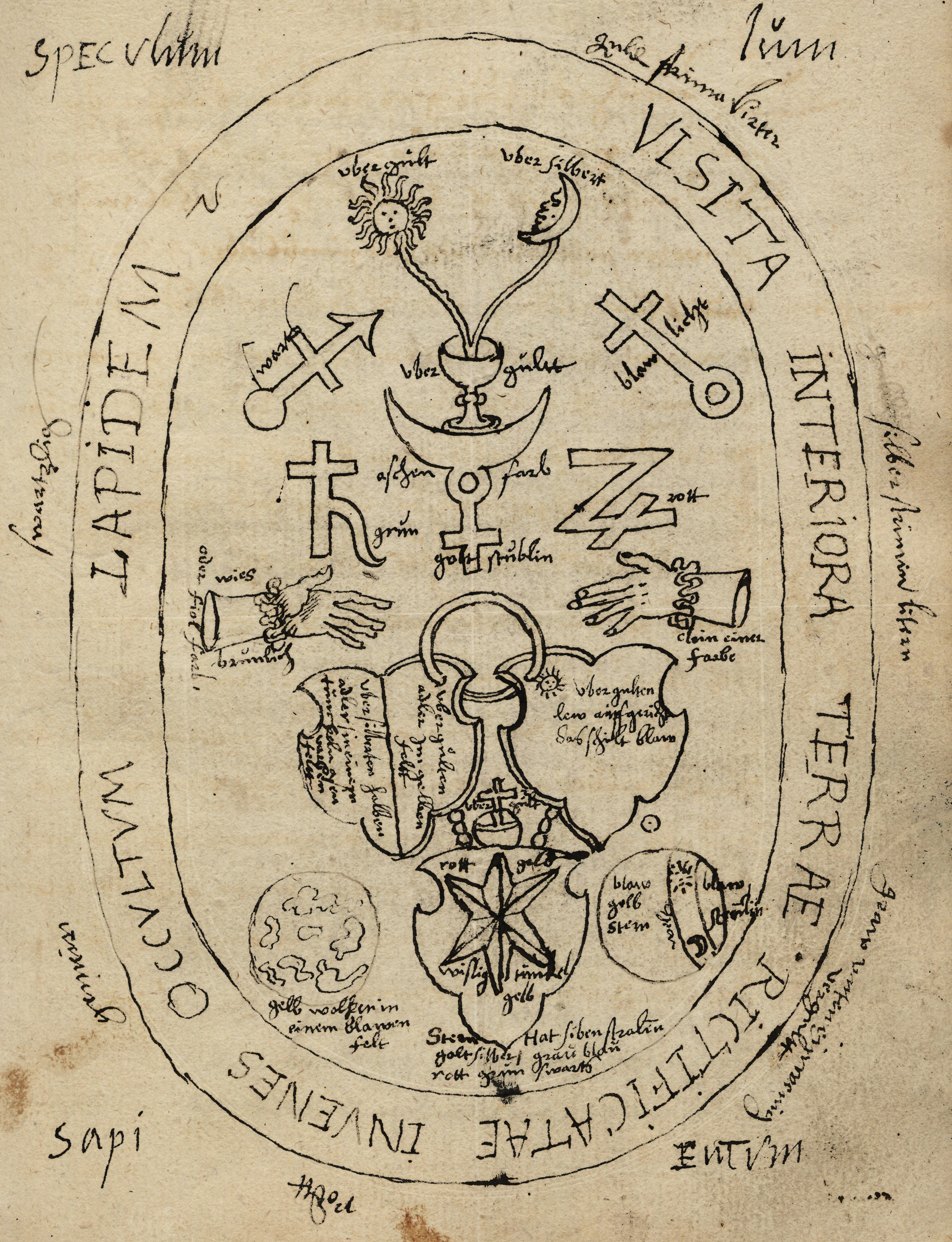
Drawn 1586 emblem denoting colours in German. (man. Kassel, 4 Ms. chem. 60[1,3]).

From the late sixteenth century onwards, the Emerald Tablet was often accompanied by a symbolic figure called Latin: Tabula Smaragdina Hermetis, lit. 'Emerald Tablet of Hermes'. This figure is encircled by an acrostic in Latin: Visita interiora terrae rectificando invenies occultum lapidem, lit. 'Visit the interior of the earth, and by rectifying, you will find the hidden stone' whose seven initials form the word Old French: vitriol, lit. 'sulphuric acid'. At the top, the sun and moon pour into a cup above the planetary symbol ☿ representing Mercury. Surrounding this mercurial cup are the four other planets, representing the classic association between the seven planets and the seven metals. Though, many of the extant copies of the emblem are not set in colour, it was originally polychrome (Note: As attested by marginal notes of a 1586 manuscript.)—linking each planetary-metallic pair with a specific colour, thus rendering: gold–Sol-gold, silver–Luna–silver, grey–Mercury–quicksilver, blue–Jupiter–tin, red–Mars–iron, green–Venus–copper, and black–Saturn–lead. At the centre are a ring and a globus cruciger; at the bottom, the celestial and terrestrial spheres. Three charges represent, according to the accompanying poem, the three principles (Note: Latin: tria prima.) of Paracelsian alchemical theory: the eagle signifying quicksilver and the spirit, the lion signifying sulphur and the soul, and the star signifying salt and the body. Finally, two Schwurhands appear alongside the image, affirming the creator's veracity.

The oldest known printed reproduction of this emblem is found in the Golden Fleece, (Note: Latin: Aureum vellus.) attributed to Salomon Trismosin—likely a pseudonym employed by a German Paracelsian. Wherein the image was accompanied by a didactic alchemical poem in German titled Außlegung und Erklerung des Gemelds oder Figur (lit. 'Interpretation and Explanation of the Painting or the Figure'). (Note: This first edition of the poem and emblem were published in Switzerland in vol. III of this treatise.) This poem explained the emblem's symbolism in relation to the Great Work and the classical goals of alchemy: wealth, health, and long life. The emblem is largely derivative. The colours, symbols and associations are all found in different Paracelsian works from the same period and unlikely to be influenced by the Tablet itself. The association with the cryptic text might have served primarily as a legitimation for an artwork also meant to be read metaphorically. Additionally, the image first spread in the circle of Karl Widemann, a known Paracelsian mystifier. Initially, the image was presented alongside the Emerald Tablet as a merely ancillary element. However, in printed editions of the seventeenth century, the poem was omitted, and the emblem came to be known as the symbolic or graphical representation of the Emerald Tablet. The emblem proliferated quickly, was frequently reproduced, and gained narrative antiquity. From Ehrd de Naxagoras in his 1733 Supplement to the Golden Fleece (Note: Latin: Supplementum Aurei Velleris.) came an example of such a narrative. In the aforementioned discovery legend a woman named Zora finds "a precious emerald plaque" engraved with this emblem in Hermes' grave in Hebron Valley. The emblem thus came to be conceptualised of as part of the esoteric tradition of interpreting Egyptian hieroglyphs. It also came to serve as an example of the Renaissance-Platonic and alchemical belief that "the deepest secrets of nature could only be appropriately expressed through an obscure and veiled mode of representation".

=== Nuremberg edition ===
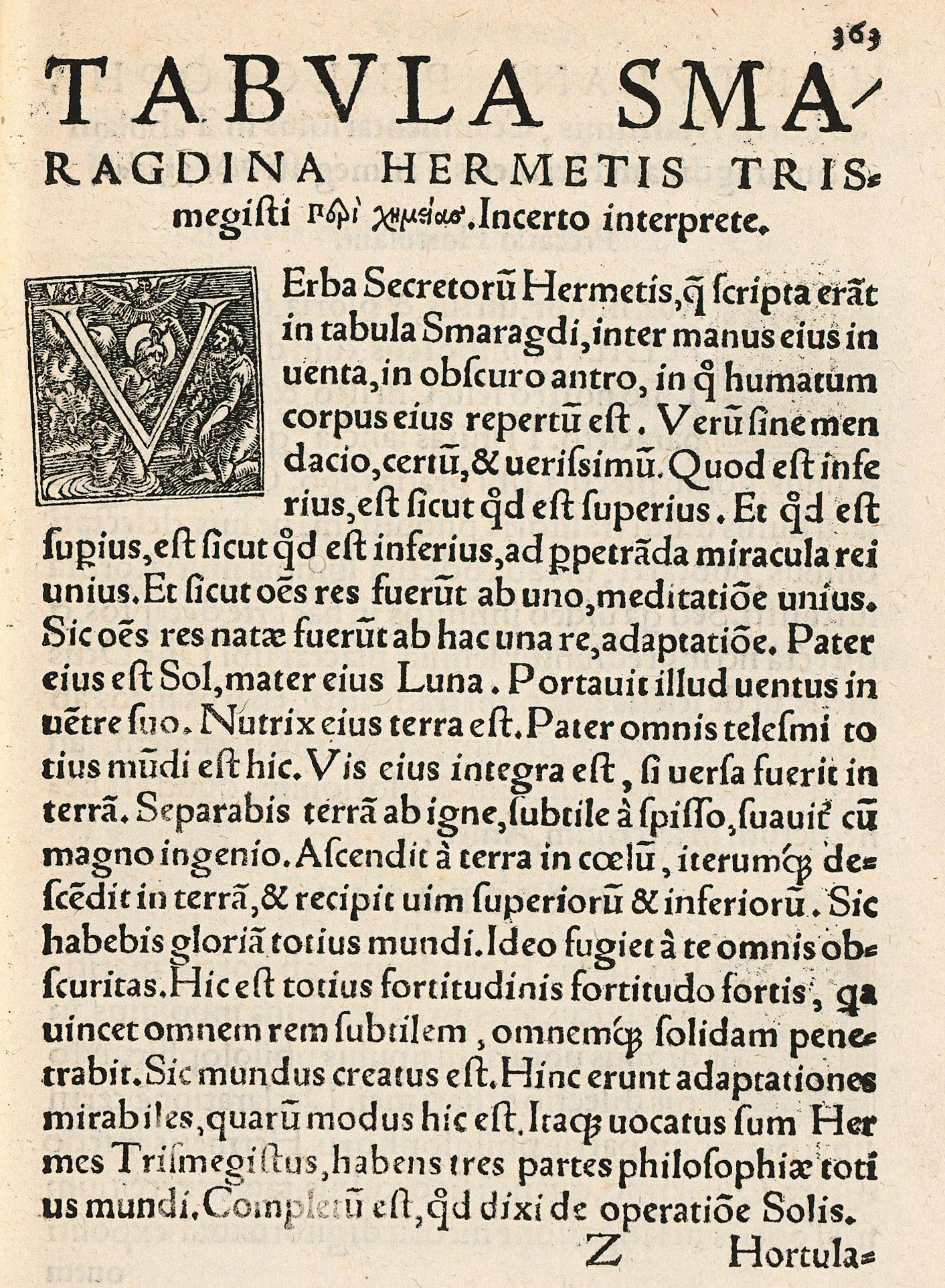
Text of the Emerald Tablet, from Johannes Petreius' Of Alchemy.

The 1541 Nuremberg edition from Johannes Petreius' Of Alchemy—largely similar to the vulgate—reads:

Verum sine mendacio, certum, et verissimum.
Quod est inferius, est sicut quod est superius.
Et quod est superius, est sicut quod est inferius, ad perpetranda miracula rei unius.
Et sicut res omnes fuerunt ab uno, meditatione unius, sic omnes res natae ab hac una re, adaptatione.
Pater eius est Sol, mater eius est Luna.
Portavit illud ventus in ventre suo.
Nutrix eius terra est.
Pater omnis telesmi totius mundi est hic.
Vis eius integra est, si versa fuerit in terram.
Separabis terram ab igne, subtile ab spisso, suaviter cum magno ingenio.
Ascendit a terra in coelum, iterumque descendit in terram, et recipit vim superiorum et inferiorum.
Sic habebis gloriam totius mundi.
Ideo fugiet a te omnis obscuritas.
Haec est totius fortitudinis fortitudo fortis, quia vincet omnem rem subtilem, omnemque solidam penetrabit.
Sic mundus creatus est.
Hinc erunt adaptationes mirabiles, quarum modus hic est.
Itaque vocatus sum Hermes Trismegistus, habens tres partes philosophiae totius mundi.
Completum est, quod dixi de operatione Solis.

— Petreius, Johannes 1541. De alchemia. Nuremberg, p. 363. (available online)
Translation:

Tis true without lying, certain and most true.
That which is below is like that which is above and that which is above is like that which is below
to do the miracle of one only thing
And as all things have been and arose from one by the mediation of one: so all things have their birth from this one thing by adaptation.
The Sun is its father, the moon its mother,
the wind hath carried it in its belly, the earth is its nurse.
The father of all perfection in the whole world is here.
Its force or power is entire if it be converted into earth.
Separate thou the earth from the fire,
the subtle from the gross
sweetly with great industry.
It ascends from the earth to the heaven and again it descends to the earth
and receives the force of things superior and inferior.
By this means you shall have the glory of the whole world and thereby all obscurity shall fly from you.
Its force is above all force,
for it vanquishes every subtle thing and penetrates every solid thing.
So was the world created.
From this are and do come admirable adaptations where of the means is here in this.
Hence I am called Hermes Trismegist, having the three parts of the philosophy of the whole world.
That which I have said of the operation of the Sun is accomplished and ended.

— Isaac Newton. "Keynes MS. 28". The Chymistry of Isaac Newton. Ed. William R. Newman. June 2010. Retrieved 4 March 2013.

=== French sonnet translation ===
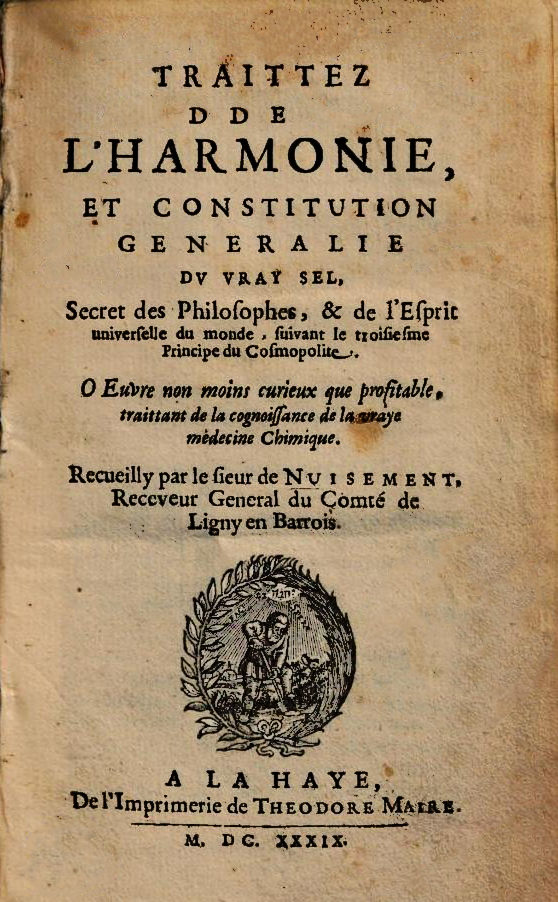
Title page of the quoted work by Hesteau.

In the fifteenth century an anonymous French version, set in verse, appeared. A revised 1621 sonnet version by Clovis Hesteau de Nuysement reads:

C'est un point aſſuré plein d'admiration,
Que le haut & le bas n'est qu'une meſme choſe:
Pour faire d'une ſeule en tout le monde encloſe,
Des effects merveilleux par adaptation.

D'un ſeul en a tout fait la meditation,
Et pour parents, matrice, & nourrice, on luy poſe,
Phœbus, Diane, l'air, & la terre, ou repoſe
Cette choſe en qui gist toute perfection.

Si on la mue en terre elle a ſa force entiere:
Separant par grand art, mais facile maniere,
Le ſubtil de l'eſpais, & la terre du feu.

De la terre elle monte au Ciel; & puis en terre,
Du Ciel elle deſcend, Recevant peu à peu,
Les vertus de tous deux qu'en ſon ventre elle enſerre.

— Hesteau 1639, p. 10.
Translation:

It's a sure point, full of admiration,
That the high and the low are but one same thing:
To make from one alone, enclosed in the whole world,
Marvelous effects by adaptation.

Meditation has made all things of this single one,
And for its parents, matrix, and nurse, they place it:
Phoebus, Diana, the air, and the earth on which
That thing reposes in which all perfection lies.

If you change it into earth, it has its full force:
Separating by great art, yet in an easy manner,
The subtle from the dense, and the earth from the fire.

From the earth it ascends to Heaven; and then, into earth
From Heaven it descends, receiving little by little
The virtues of both, which in its womb it encloses.

— literal translation.

=== Enlightenment ===
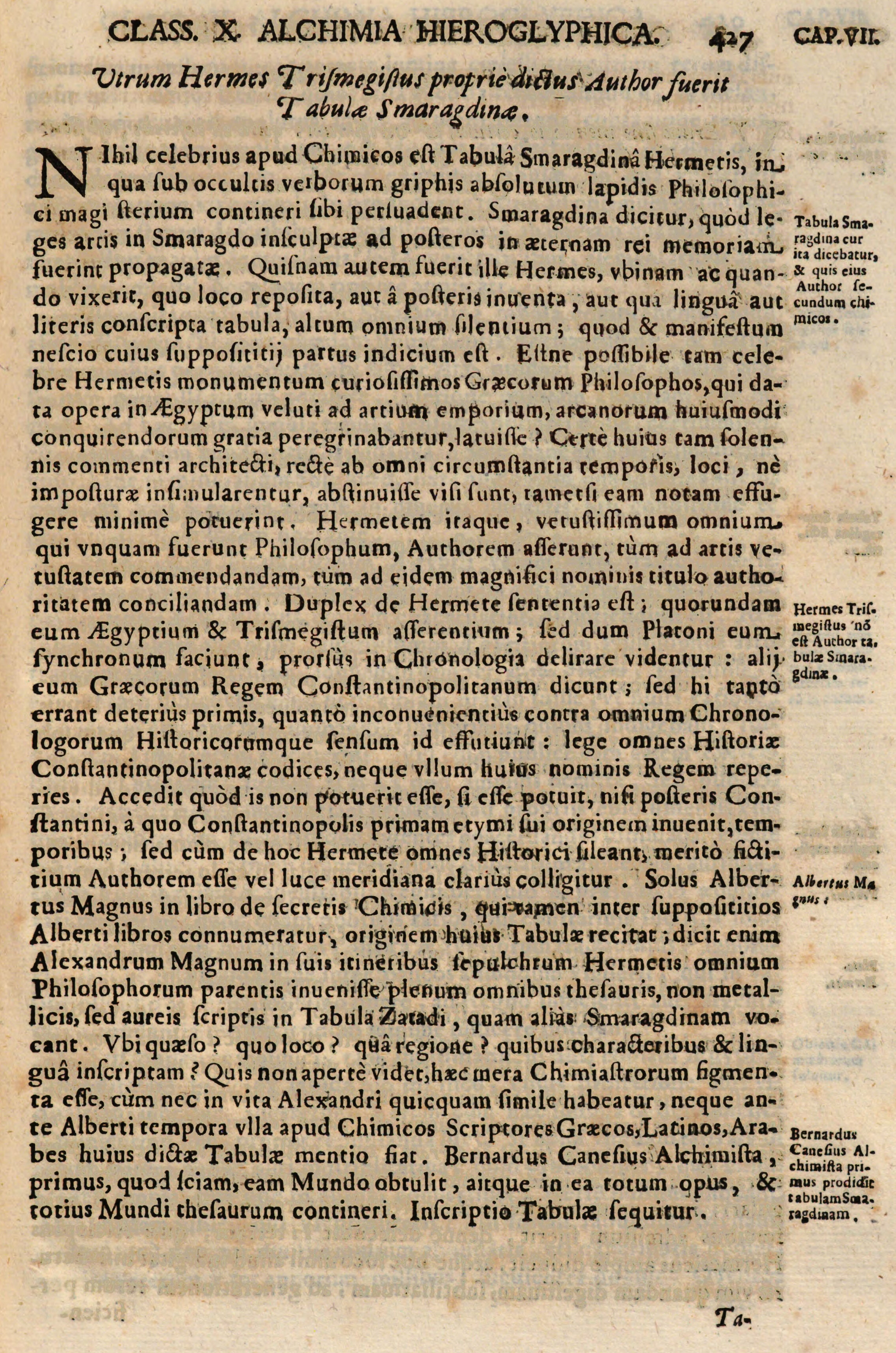
Beginning of the tractate On the Authorship of the Emerald Tablet from the Egyptian Oedipus vol. 2 no. 1.

From the dawning seventeenth-century Enlightenment onward, a number of authors began to issue challenges to the attribution of the Emerald Tablet to Hermes Trismegistus. Chronologically first among them was the former alchemist Nicolas Guibert. He believed the ancients had never mentioned alchemy by name and the practice of identifying gold and silver by the names of planets was an idea first advanced by Proclus. He argued, therefore, that the Emerald Tablet must be inauthentic. These attacks were supported by a rising spectre of doubt surrounding all things Hermetic, following a linguistic analysis by Isaac Casaubon, calling into question the authenticity of the Corpus Hermeticum and Hermes himself. The most prominent attack came from Athanasius Kircher in his Egyptian Oedipus. Kircher rejected the Emerald Tablet's attribution to Hermes Trismegistus, as it did not support his interpretation of hieroglyphs; he argued that the Tablet's "barbaric" Latin (Note: Referring to terms like Latin: fatitudo fortis which is a corrupted variant of Latin: fortitudo fortis, lit. 'power of all powers' and also focussing in on the aforementioned Latin: tabula zatadi, lit. 'zatadi tablet'.) betrayed a much later, post‐classical origin. Additionally, he pointed out that no ancient Greek philosophers ever mention it—a silence he took as evidence of forgery. Further, he associated it with a group of alchemists he considered delusional (Note: He addressed them mockingly as Latin: Cimiastorum, lit. '(of) mixers' instead of the more neutral Latin: Alchemistarum, lit. '(of) Alchemists' in the tractate. In the preceding one he lampooned modern alchemists as describing the philosopher's stone with "useless prolixity and a ludicrous structure" and generally being wrong and misguided about most things.) and rejected the story of its discovery in Hermes' tomb as a pure figment of their imagination. He applied critical arguments he otherwise rejected—for example when defending the legitimacy of the Corpus Hermeticum—when the text in question conflicted with his aims. Kircher's critique was forceful enough to draw out a response from the Danish alchemist Ole Borch in his 1668 On the Origin and Progress of Chemistry. (Note: Latin: De ortu et progressu chemiae.) In which Borch sought to distinguish genuinely ancient Hermetic writings from later forgeries and to re‐value the Emerald Tablet as truly Egyptian in origin. Amid this climate of inquiry and doubt a 1684 tractate by Wilhelm Christoph Kriegsmann deployed linguistic analysis—incorporating Hebrew—to assert that Hermes Trismegistus was not the Egyptian Thoth but the Phoenician Taaut—whom Tacitus identifies as Tuisto, the legendary divine progenitor of the Germanic peoples. The debate continued and both Borch's and Kriegsmann's treatises were reprinted (alongside many others) in Jean-Jacques Manget's Curious Chemical Library.

The Emerald Tablet was still translated and commented upon by Isaac Newton, who rendered the recondite Latin: telesmus as "perfection". But the result of this age of upheaval and inquiry was the gradual decline of alchemy during the eighteenth century. The hardest blow to alchemy's legitimacy was the advent of modern chemistry and the work of Lavoisier—with the 1720s marking the turning point when alchemy lost the trust of the emergent chemical community. The emerging category of modern science fundamentally conflicted with the practical and theoretical traditions of alchemy. It left no room for alchemists within the new definition of the scientist, leading to a sharp decline in alchemical works after the 1780s.

== Modernity and present ==
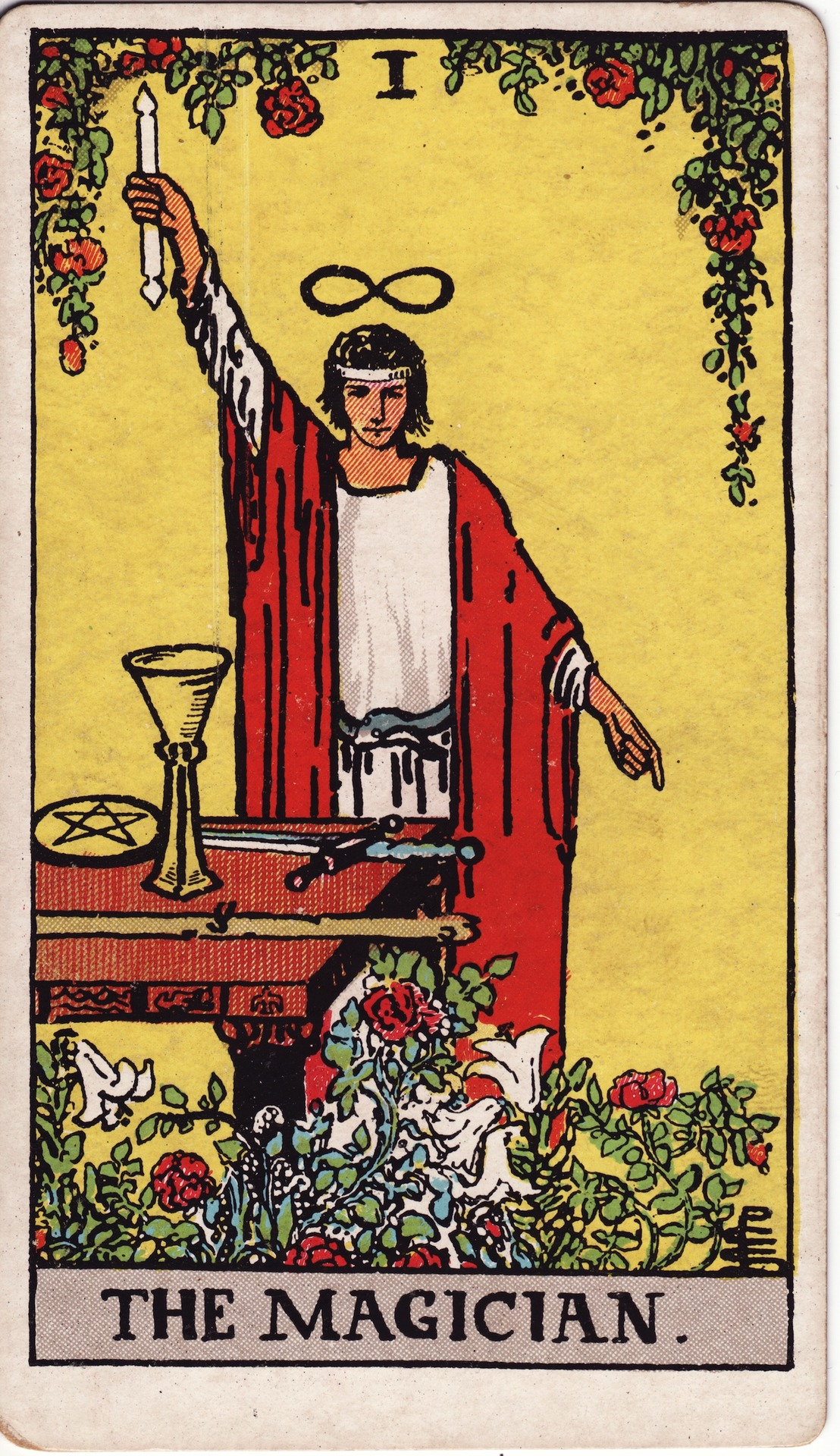
The Magician, from the 1909 Rider–Waite tarot deck, often thought to represent the concept of "as above, so below".

=== Esotericism and academia ===
The Emerald Tablet continued to interest esotericists—and beginning in the 1850s and lasting up to the 1920s the newly emerging occultist current. In France the first occultist, Éliphas Lévi, considered it the most important magical text. (Note: "Nothing surpasses, nor equals, as a synthesis of all the doctrines of the ancient world, those few sentences engraved on a precious stone by Hermes and known under the name of the Emerald Tablet; the unity of being and the unity of harmonies—whether ascending or descending—the progressive and proportional scale of the Word; the immutable law of equilibrium and the proportional advancement of universal analogies; the relation of the idea to the Word, establishing the measure of the relationship between creator and created; the mathematics of the infinite, demonstrated through the measures of a single corner of the finite—all of this is expressed in that single proposition of the great Egyptian hierophant: […] The Emerald Tablet is all of magic in a single page.") Additionally, figures like Stanislas de Guaïta and Papus spent little time engaging with the broader Hermetic tradition but focused much of their efforts onto exegesis of the Tablet. In Italy Giuliano Kremmerz authored a long commentary on it. English scholars such as John Chambers initiated the academic study of the Hermetica. However, the most influential figure in this endeavor was George R.S. Mead. He began his examinations in the Theosophical Society, but broke with it in 1879. From thereon he developed a scholarly objectivity when engaging with the material while not concealing his personal occultist beliefs. (Note: It is for this reason that his work can be seen as the first step towards the 20th-century scholarly approaches of Richard Reitzenstein, Walter Scott, Arthur Nock, André-Jean Festugière, Gilles Quispel, Roelof van den Broek, Jean-Pierre Mahé, and Brian Copenhaver.)

The co-founder of the Theosophical Society, Helena Blavatsky produced exegetical interpretations of the Tablet. She also popularized a paraphrase of the second verse of the vulgate: "as above, so below". This use—along with that in the Kybalion (Note: Which is often speculated to be the work of William W. Atkinson, a New Thought pioneer.)—propelled it to become an oft-cited motto. Later in the twentieth century, it would rise to particular prominence in New Age circles. This led to its adoption as a title for various works of art.

A figure also influenced by Blavatsky was the Dutch founder of the Lectorium Rosicrucianum, Jan van Rijckenborgh. He used the Tablet to derive the crux of his own worldview and ascribed much antiquity to it. The world's most extensive collection of Hermetica is found in the Bibliotheca Philosophica Hermetica, (Note: It is also notable for the scholars it has attracted to its editorial board such as Frans A. Janssen and Carlos Gilly.) which was founded by a member of the Lectorium, Joost Ritman. Perennialists as a whole have largely kept their distance from Hermeticism and its receptions in Western esotericism. Two exceptions are the traditionalist Titus Burckhardt, who produced one of the best-known modern commentaries on the Tablet, and fellow traditionalist and founder of the UR Group, Julius Evola, who made the Tablet central to his 1931 The Hermetic Tradition.

A prominent academic reception of the Tablet occurred in Carl Jung's psychology of alchemy. He saw it as the paramount text of alchemy and described Evola's The Hermetic Tradition as "a magisterial portrayal of hermetic philosophy". (Note: Evola, however, opposed Jung's interpretations.) Jung had read Ruska 1926 and was familiar with the Arabic text of the Book of the Secret of Creation and the debates surrounding the text's age and original language. He focused his textual analysis mainly, however, on the Latin vulgate text. (Note: Exhibiting a particular textual preference for the 1541 Nuremberg edition.) The Tablet's alchemical operations—most notably the "operation of the sun"—became, for Jung, powerful metaphors: the sun's "art" of creating gold is none other than consciousness splitting from a "primeval" archetypal source, working through the "prima materia" of the psyche, and reuniting to generate a transformed, individuated self.

=== Arts and popular culture ===
At the beginning of the twentieth century, alchemy fascinated the surrealist André Breton. He believed the aim of surrealism should be to ascertain the point within the mind where life and death, real and imaginary, past and future etc no longer seem contradictory. In the introduction of a 1942 essay, Breton directly referenced the Emerald Tablet's dictum "as above, so below" by invoking the image of a soaring bird and a lift descending into a mine-shaft clashing. (Note: "The bird's vertical flight and the lift sinking ever deeper down the mine-shaft, then rising to the surface again, determined between them a hitherto unsuspected meeting-place where there clashed and blended together the shapes of the sidereal bestiary, of germination, of mechanical traction, of blossoming crystals, as well as, devil take it, some designs from the wallpaper from my room and the bundle of shadows that falls from my hat. First Commandment: Everything should be freed from its shell (from its distance, its comparative size, its physical and chemical properties, its outward appearance). Never believe in the interior of a cave, always in the surface of an egg.") The metaphor led up to his first commandment: "Never believe in the interior of a cave, always in the surface of an egg." (Note: Referring to an alchemical egg ie the sealed glass vessel in which the transmutation of metals is attempted by the alchemist.) Breton thereby employed an alchemical reading of the Tablet to bind dichotomous forces into a seamless whole. He saw Max Ernst, who claimed to have been born from an egg, as that very "alchemical egg"—his birth myth and his art as having fused celestial and chthonic forces into that single whole.

Jorge Ben released the studio album A Tábua de Esmeralda ("The Emerald Tablet") in 1974. In it, he explored the theme of alchemy through tracks like "Os Alquimistas estão chegando Os Alquimistas," "Errare Humanum Est," and "Hermes Trismegisto e Sua Celeste Tábua de Esmeralda," using reiterated modal phrases that evoked a liturgical resonance. The album exemplified Ben's distinctive fusion of samba with elements of jazz and rock, shaped by his percussive, self-taught guitar technique and supported by musicians from across the spectrum of Música popular brasileira. Some Música popular brasileira-traditionalists saw this as a concession to the US garage rock-inspired style known as Jovem Guarda.

Manfred Kelkel composed Tabula Smaragdina (Op. 24) between 1975 and 1977. Conceived as a ballet hermétique, the work aimed to unite his passions for esotericism, alchemy, and music. Kelkel sought to render sound and thought visible through graphic mandalas, which mapped zodiac signs, planets, and the four elements onto instruments, scales, and rhythms. During performance, twelve symbolic images were projected alongside a simplified conventional score—transforming each page of the work into both stage scenery and musical instructions. To structure the piece, Kelkel drew on sources such as Chinese trigrams, fractal geometry, medieval magic squares, and the harmony of the spheres. He created twelve successive movements, each named after a phase in the alchemical process—such as Nuptiae chymicae and Coagulatio—and each possessing its own emblem and formal rules. The result was a codified "metamusic", designed to awaken hidden cosmic and psychological resonances through structured, alchemical transformations.

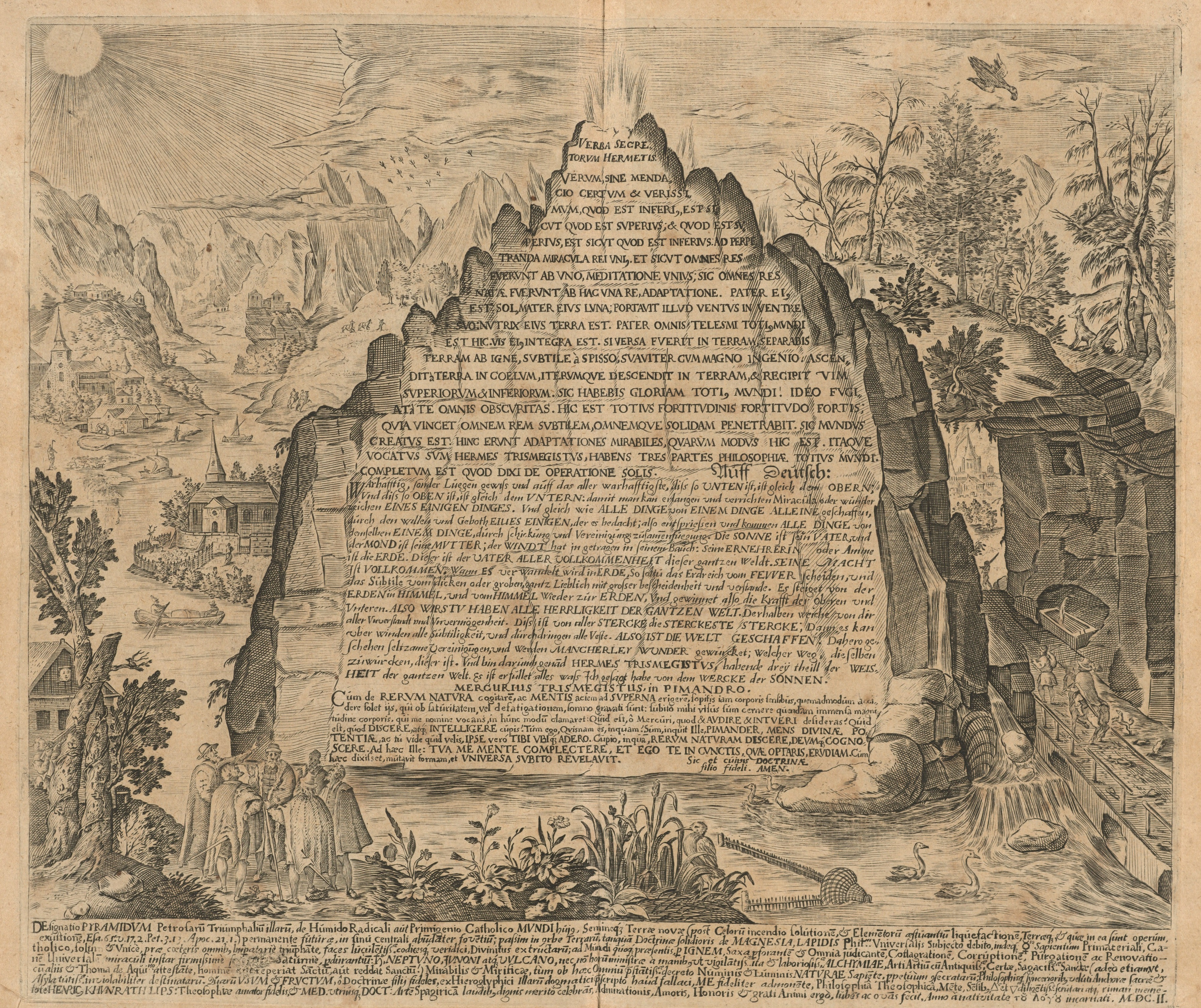
Khunrath's illustration used in Dark.

In the 2010s German time travel television series Dark, the mysterious priest Noah has a large image of a graphic depiction of an emerald tablet, featuring the text of the Emerald Tablet, tattooed on his back. The image, which stems from Heinrich Khunrath's Amphitheatre of Eternal Wisdom (1609), also appears on a metal door in the caves that are central to the plot. Several characters are shown looking at copies of the text. A verse from the 1541 Nuremberg version Latin: Sic mundus creatus est, lit. 'So was the world created' plays a prominent thematic role in the series and is the title of the sixth episode of the first season.

== Bibliography ==
- Arié, Rachel (1990). Études sur la civilisation de l'Espagne musulmane [Studies on the Civilization of Muslim Spain] (in French). Brill Archive. ISBN 978-90-04-09116-0.
- Bacon, Roger (1920). Steele, Robert (ed.). Secretum Secretorum cum glossis et notulis [Secret of Secrets with Glosses and Notes]. Opera hactenus inedita (in Latin). Vol. 5. Oxford: Clarendon Press.
- Badawi, Abd al-Rahman (1954). al-Usūl al-Yūnāniyya li-l-naẓariyyāt al-siyāsiyya fī al-islām الأصول اليونانية للنظريات السياسية في الإسلام [The Greek Foundations of Political Theories in Islam] (in Arabic). Cairo: Maktabat al-Nahḍa al-Miṣriyya. OCLC 12629786.
- Béhar, Henri (1990). André Breton: Le grand indésirable [André Breton: The Great Undesirable] (in French). Paris: Calmann-Lévy. ISBN 978-2-7021-1584-8.
- van Bladel, Kevin Thomas (2009). The Arabic Hermes: From Pagan Sage to Prophet of Science. Oxford Studies in Late Antiquity. Oxford: Oxford University Press. ISBN 978-0-19-537613-5.
- Blavatsky, Helena Petrovna (1891). Isis Unveiled: A Master-Key to the Mysteries of Ancient and Modern Science and Theology. Vol. 1 (6th ed.). New York: J. W. Bouton.
- Breton, André (1988). Bonnet, Marguerite; Bernier, Philippe; Hubert, Étienne-Alain; Pierre, José (eds.). Œuvres complètes [Complete Works]. Bibliothèque de la Pléiade (in French). Vol. 1. Gallimard.
- Bull, Christian H. (2018). The Tradition of Hermes Trismegistus: The Egyptian Priestly Figure as a Teacher of Hellenized Wisdom. Religions in the Graeco-Roman World: 186. Leiden: Brill. doi:10.1163/9789004370845. ISBN 978-90-04-37084-5. S2CID 165266222.
- Burckhardt, Titus (1960). Alchemie – Sinn und Weltbild [Alchemy – Meaning and Worldview] (in German). Olten: Walter Verlag.
- Caiazzo, Irene (2004). "La Tabula smaragdina nel Medioevo latino, II. Note sulla fortuna della Tabula smaragdina nel Medioevo latino" [The Tabula Smaragdina in the Latin Middle Ages, II. Notes on the Fortunes of the *Tabula Smaragdina* in the Latin Middle Ages]. In Lucentini, P.; Parri, I.; Perrone Compagni, V. (eds.). La tradizione ermetica dal mondo tardo-antico all'umanesimo. Atti del Convegno internazionale di studi, Napoli, 20–24 novembre 2001 [The Hermetic tradition from the Late Antique world to Humanism. Proceedings of the International Conference of Studies, Naples, 20–24 November 2001]. Instrumenta Patristica et Mediaevalia (in Italian). Vol. 40. Turnhout: Brepols. pp. 697–711. doi:10.1484/M.IPM-EB.4.00122. ISBN 978-2-503-51616-5.
- Calvet, Antoine (3 August 2022). "L'alchimie médiévale est-elle une science chrétienne ?" [Is Medieval Alchemy a Christian Science?]. Les Dossiers du Grihl (in French) (Hors-série n°3). doi:10.4000/dossiersgrihl.321.
- Colinet, Andrée (1995). "Le livre d'Hermès intitulé Liber dabessi ou Liber rebis" [The book of Hermes titled Liber dabessi or Liber rebis]. Studi medievali (in French). 36 (2): 1011–1052.
- Davis, Tenney L. (1926). "The Emerald Table of Hermes Trismegistus. Three Latin Versions Which Were Current among Later Alchemists". Journal of Chemical Education. 3 (8): 863–875. Bibcode:1926JChEd...3..863D. doi:10.1021/ed003p863.
- Debus, Allen G. (2004). Alchemy and Early Modern Chemistry: Papers from Ambix. Jeremy Mills Publishing. ISBN 9780954648411.
- Dobbs, Betty Jo Teeter (1988). "Newton's Commentary on the Emerald Tablet of Hermes Trismegistus: Its Scientific and Theological Significance". In Merkel, Ingrid; Debus, Allen G. (eds.). Hermeticism and the Renaissance: Intellectual History and the Occult in Early Modern Europe. Washington, D.C.: Folger Books. pp. 182–191.
- Ebeling, Florian (2007). The Secret History of Hermes Trismegistus: Hermeticism from Ancient to Modern Times. Translated by Lorton, David. Ithaca: Cornell University Press. ISBN 978-0-8014-4546-0. JSTOR 10.7591/j.ctt1ffjptt.
- Faivre, Antoine (1988). Présences d'Hermès Trismégiste [Presences of Hermes Trismegistus]. Cahiers de l'Hermétisme (in French). Éditions Albin Michel.
- Faivre, Antoine (1994). Access to Western Esotericism. SUNY Series in Western Esoteric Traditions. Albany, New York: SUNY Press. ISBN 0-7914-2178-3.
- Faivre, Antoine (1995). The Eternal Hermes: From Greek God to Alchemical Magus. Translated by Joscelyn Godwin. Grand Rapids, Michigan: Phanes Press. p. 213. ISBN 0-933999-52-6.
- Faivre, Antoine (2005). "Hermetic Literature IV: Renaissance – Present". In Hanegraaff, Wouter J. (ed.). Dictionary of Gnosis & Western Esotericism. Leiden: Brill. pp. 533–544. ISBN 978-90-04-14187-2.
- Friesen, Izzy; Patton, Paul (2023). "Discipline Dynamics of Chymistry and Rejection of Alchemy". Scientonomy: Journal for the Science of Science. 5: 1–22. doi:10.33137/js.v5i.42268.
- Forshaw, Peter J. (2007). "Alchemical Exegesis: Fractious Distillations of the Essence of Hermes". In Principe, Lawrence M. (ed.). Chymists and Chymistry: Studies in the History of Alchemy and Early Modern Chemistry. Sagamore Beach, MA: Science History Publications/USA. pp. 25–38. ISBN 978-0-88135-396-9.
- Ganzenmüller, Wilhelm (1938). Die Alchemie im Mittelalter [Alchemy in the Middle Ages] (in German). Paderborn: Bonifacius-Druckerei.
- Gilly, Carlos (2003). "On the genesis of L. Zetzner's Theatrum Chemicum in Strasbourg". In Gilly, Carlos; van Heertum, Cis (eds.). Magia, alchimia, scienza dal '400 al '700. L'influsso di Ermete Trismegisto [Magic, alchemy and science 15th–18th centuries. The influence of Hermes Trismegistus]. Florence: Centro Di. ISBN 8870383857.
- Godwin, Joscelyn (2007). "Introducción" [Introduction]. La fuga de Atalanta [The Fugue of Atalanta] (in Spanish). Girona: Atalanta. pp. 11–62.
- Goodrick-Clarke, Nicholas (2013). "Western Esoteric Traditions and Theosophy". In Hammer, Olav; Rothstein, Mikael (eds.). Handbook of the Theosophical Current. Leiden: Brill. pp. 259–307. doi:10.1163/9789004235977_015. ISBN 9789004235960.
- Hakl, Hans Thomas (2017). "The Symbology of Hermeticism in the Work of Julius Evola". In Forshaw, Peter J. (ed.). Lux in Tenebris: The Visual and the Symbolic in Western Esotericism. Aries Book Series: Texts and Studies in Western Esotericism. Vol. 23. Leiden; Boston: Brill. pp. 334–362. doi:10.1163/9789004334953_016. ISBN 9789004334946.
- Hasler, Johann F. W. (2011). "Performative and Multimedia Aspects of Late-Renaissance Meditative Alchemy: The Case of Michael Maier's Atalanta Fugiens (1617)". Revista de Estudios Sociales (39): 135–144. doi:10.7440/res39.2011.11. hdl:10495/4984.
- Hesteau, Clovis (1639). Traittez de l'harmonie et constitution généralle du vray sel, secret des philosophes, et de l'esprit universelle du monde, suivant le troisiesme principe du Cosmopolite [Treatise on the harmony and general constitution of true salt, secret of philosophers, and of the universal spirit of the world, following the third principle of the Cosmopolitan.] (in French). The Hague: De l'Imprimerie de Theodore Maire.
- Holmyard, Eric J. (1923). "The Emerald Table". Nature. 112 (2814): 525–526. Bibcode:1923Natur.112..525H. doi:10.1038/112525a0.
- Horowitz, Mitch (2019). "The New Age and Gnosticism: Terms of Commonality". Gnosis: Journal of Gnostic Studies. 4 (2): 191–215. doi:10.1163/2451859X-12340073. S2CID 214533789.
- Houdas, Octave (1893). "Le livre de Cratès" [The Book of Crates]. In Berthelot, Marcellin (ed.). Histoire des sciences. La chimie au Moyen Âge, vol. III: L'alchimie arabe [History of Science. Chemistry in the Middle Ages, Vol. III: Arabic Alchemy] (in French). Paris: Imprimerie nationale. pp. 44–75.
- Hudry, Françoise (1997–1999). "Le De secretis nature du ps.-Apollonius de Tyane, traduction latine par Hugues de Santalla du Kitâb sirr al-halîqa" [De secretis naturae by the Pseudo-Apollonius of Tyana, Latin translation by Hugh of Santalla of the Kitāb sirr al-ḥalīqa]. Chrysopoeia (in French). 6: 1–154.
- Kahn, Didier (1994). La table d'émeraude et sa tradition alchimique [The Emerald Tablet and Its Alchemical Tradition] (in French). Paris: Les Belles Lettres. ISBN 9782251470054.
- Kahn, Didier (2007). Alchimie et Paracelsisme en France à la fin de la Renaissance (1567–1625) [Alchemy and Paracelsianism in France at the End of the Renaissance (1567–1625)] (in French). Geneva: Droz. ISBN 978-2-600-00688-0.
- Kahn, Didier (2016). Le fixe et le volatil: chimie et alchimie, de Paracelse à Lavoisier [The Fixed and the Volatile: Chemistry and Alchemy from Paracelsus to Lavoisier]. Histoire de sciences (in French). Paris: CNRS éditions. ISBN 978-2-271-08985-4.
- Kahn, Didier (2017). "Généalogie de l'alchimie et interprétation alchimique de la Bible au XIVᵉ siècle : « Qui fuerint primi inventores hujus artis »" [Genealogy of Alchemy and Alchemical Interpretation of the Bible in the 14th Century: ' Qui fuerint primi inventores hujus artis']. Archives d'histoire doctrinale et littéraire du Moyen Âge (in French). 84. Librairie Philosophique J. Vrin: 313–347. JSTOR 45134421.
- Kircher, Athanasius (1653). Oedipus Aegyptiacus [Egyptian Oedipus] (in Latin). Vol. 2, 1. Romae: Mascardus.
- Kraus, Paul (1943). Jâbir ibn Hayyân: Contribution à l'histoire des idées scientifiques dans l'Islam: Jābir and Greek Science Jâbir et la science grecque [Jābir ibn Ḥayyān: Contribution to the History of Scientific Thought in Islam]. Mémoires de l'Institut d'Égypte (in French). Vol. 45/II. Cairo: Institut Français d'Archéologie Orientale.
- Kriegsmann, Wilhelm Christoph (1684). Reiß, Johann Heinrich (ed.). Conjectaneorum De Germanicae Gentis Origine ac Conditore Hermete Trismegisto qui Moysi est Chanaan, Tacito Tuito, Mercuriusque Gentilibus [Conjectures on the Origin of the Germanic People and Its Founder Hermes Trismegistus, Who Is Canaan for Moses, Tuisto for Tacitus, and Mercury for the Pagans] (in Latin). Tübingen: Philibert Brunn.
- Lévi, Éliphas (1860). Histoire de la Magie [History of Magic] (in French). Germer Baillière. Archived from the original on 24 October 2023.
- Linden, Stanton J. (2003). Linden, Stanton J. (ed.). The Alchemy Reader: From Hermes Trismegistus to Isaac Newton. Cambridge: Cambridge University Press. doi:10.1017/CBO9781107050846. ISBN 0-521-79234-7.
- Lindsay, Jack (1986). Les origines de l'alchimie dans l'Égypte gréco-romaine [The Origins of Alchemy in Greco-Roman Egypt] (in French). Éditions du Rocher. ISBN 2268004546.
- Litwa, M. David (2018). Litwa, M. David (ed.). Hermetica II: The Excerpts of Stobaeus, Papyrus Fragments, and Ancient Testimonies in an English Translation with Notes and Introductions. Cambridge: Cambridge University Press. doi:10.1017/9781316856567. ISBN 978-1-107-18253-0. S2CID 217372464.
- Mandosio, Jean-Marc (2003). Dans le chaudron du négatif [In the Cauldron of the Negative] (in French). Paris: Éditions de l'Encyclopédie des Nuisances. ISBN 978-2-910386-21-4.
- Mandosio, Jean-Marc (2004a). "Françoise Hudry (éd.), «Le De secretis nature du ps.-Apollonius de Tyane, traduction latine par Hugues de Santalla du Kitâb sirr al-halîqa», Chrysopœia, 6, 1997-1999 [2000]" [Françoise Hudry (ed.), "De secretis naturae by the Pseudo-Apollonius of Tyana: Latin Translation by Hugh of Santalla of the Kitāb sirr al-ḥalīqa", Chrysopoeia, 6, 1997–1999 [2000]]. Archivum Latinitatis Medii Aevi. 62: 317–321.
- Mandosio, Jean-Marc (2004b). "La Tabula smaragdina nel Medioevo latino, I. La Tabula smaragdina e i suoi commentari medievali" [The Tabula Smaragdina in the Latin Middle Ages, I. The Tabula Smaragdina and Its Medieval Commentaries]. In Lucentini, P.; Parri, I.; Perrone Compagni, V. (eds.). La tradizione ermetica dal mondo tardo-antico all'umanesimo. Atti del Convegno internazionale di studi, Napoli, 20–24 novembre 2001 [Hermetism from Late Antiquity to Humanism]. Instrumenta Patristica et Mediaevalia (in Italian). Vol. 40. Turnhout: Brepols. pp. 681–696. doi:10.1484/M.IPM-EB.4.00121. ISBN 978-2-503-51616-5.
- Mandosio, Jean-Marc (2005). "La création verbale dans l'alchimie latine du Moyen Âge" [Verbal Creation in Latin Alchemy of the Middle Ages]. Archivum Latinitatis Medii Aevi (in French). 63: 137–147. doi:10.3406/alma.2005.894.
- Manzalaoui, Mahmoud (1974). "The Pseudo-Aristotelian Kitāb Sirr al-asrār: Facts and Problems". Oriens. 23/24: 147–257. doi:10.2307/1580104. JSTOR 1580104.
- Marvell, Leon (2013). "Take Two Emerald Tablets in the Morning: 518 Surrealism and the Alchemical Transubstantiation of the World". The Pomegranate: The International Journal of Pagan Studies. 15 (1–2): 139–154. doi:10.1558/pome.v15i1-2.139 (inactive 28 January 2026). ISSN 1528-0268.
- Matton, Sylvain (1993). "Marsile Ficin et l'alchimie: sa position, son influence" [Marsilio Ficino and Alchemy: His Position, His Influence]. In Margolin, Jean-Claude; Matton, Sylvain (eds.). Alchimie et philosophie à la Renaissance [Alchemy and Philosophy in the Renaissance] (in French). Paris: Vrin. pp. 123–192. doi:10.4000/books.vrin.21663. ISBN 978-2-7116-1172-0.
- Nau, François (1907). "Une ancienne traduction latine du Bélinous arabe (Apollonius de Tyane)" [An Ancient Latin Translation of the Arabic Bélinous (Apollonius of Tyana)]. Revue de l'Orient chrétien. 2e série. 12: 99–106.
- Needham, Joseph; Ping-yü, Ho; Gwei-djen, Lu; Sivin, Nathan (1980). Science and Civilisation in China. Volume 5: Chemistry and Chemical Technology. Part IV: Spagyrical Discovery and Invention: Apparatus, Theories and Gifts. Cambridge: Cambridge University Press. ISBN 0-521-08573-X. LCCN 54-4723. OCLC 7814708.
- Nenzén, Niklas (2020). "Mystik och polemik: Hur begreppet gnosis förstås och används av Lectorium Rosicrucianum" [Mysticism and Polemics: How the Concept of Gnosis Is Understood and Used by the Lectorium Rosicrucianum]. AURA – Tidsskrift for akademiske studier av nyreligiøsitet (in Swedish). 11 (1): 52–80. doi:10.31265/aura.358.
- Newell, C.H. (4 December 2017). "Dark – Season 1, Episode 6: "Sic Mundus Creatus Est"". Father Son Holy Gore. Archived from the original on 17 February 2018.
- Newman, William R. (2019). Newton the Alchemist: Science, Enigma, and the Quest for Nature's Secret Fire. Princeton: Princeton University Press. ISBN 978-0-691-17487-7.
- Newton, Isaac (2010). Newman, William R.; Johnson, John A. (eds.). "Hermes". The Chemistry of Isaac Newton - Indiana University Bloomington. Archived from the original on 15 January 2025.
- Nguyen, Hanh (8 December 2017). "Netflix's 'Dark': Theories and Burning Questions About Jonas' Tattoo, the Wallpaper, and More". IndieWire. Archived from the original on 9 December 2017.
- Obrist, Barbara (2003). "Visualization in Medieval Alchemy" (PDF). International Journal for Philosophy of Chemistry. 9 (2): 131–170. Archived from the original (PDF) on 22 December 2024.
- Pearsall, Derek; Mooney, Linne R. (2021). "London, College of Arms, MS Arundel 45". A Descriptive Catalogue of the English Manuscripts of John Gower's Confessio Amantis. Publications of the John Gower Society. Woodbridge: Boydell & Brewer. pp. 137–143. doi:10.1017/9781800103047.021. ISBN 978-1-80010-304-7.
- Plessner, Martin (1927). "Neue Materialien zur Geschichte der Tabula Smaragdina" [New Materials on the History of the Tabula Smaragdina]. Der Islam. 16 (1): 77–113. doi:10.1515/islm.1927.16.1.77.
- Polizzotti, Mark (1999). André Breton (in French). Paris: Gallimard. ISBN 978-2-07-073298-2.
- Polydorus, Chrysogonus (1541). De alchemia [Of Alchemy]. Nuremberg: Iohannes Petreius. doi:10.3931/e-rara-5596.
- Principe, Lawrence M. (2013). The Secrets of Alchemy. Chicago: University of Chicago Press. ISBN 978-0226103792.
- Prophet, Erin (2018). "Hermetic Influences on the Evolutionary System of Helena Blavatsky's Theosophy". Gnosis: Journal of Gnostic Studies. 3 (1): 84–111. doi:10.1163/2451859X-12340050.
- Raggetti, Lucia (2019). "Apollonius of Tyana's Great Book of Talismans" (PDF). Nuncius. 34 (1). Brill: 155–182. doi:10.1163/18253911-03401008.
- Rosenthal, Franz (1975). The Classical Heritage in Islam. London: Routledge. ISBN 9780415076937.
- Read, John (1937). Prelude to Chemistry: An Outline of Alchemy, Its Literature and Relationships. New York: Macmillan. OCLC 1564590151.
- Rudolph, Ulrich (1995). "Kalām in antiken Gewand. Das theologische Konzept des Kitāb Sirr al-Ḫalīqa". In Fodor, Alexander (ed.). Kalām im antiken Gewand: Das theologische Konzept des Kitāb sirr al-ḫalīqa [Kalām in Ancient Garb: The Theological Concept of the Kitāb Sirr al-Ḫalīqa]. The Arabist: Budapest Studies in Arabic (in German). Vol. 13–14. Budapest: Eötvös Loránd University. pp. 123–136.
- Ruska, Julius (1924). Arabische Alchemisten [Arabian Alchemists] (in German). Heidelberg: C. Winter. p. 306.
- Ruska, Julius (1925). "Der Urtext der Tabula Smaragdina" [The Original Text of the Tabula Smaragdina]. Orientalistische Literaturzeitung (in German). 28 (1–6): 349–351. doi:10.1524/olzg.1925.28.16.175.
- Ruska, Julius (1926). Tabula Smaragdina. Ein Beitrag zur Geschichte der hermetischen Literatur [Tabula Smaragdina: A Contribution to the History of Hermetic Literature] (in German). Heidelberg: Winter. OCLC 6751465.
- Selwood, Dominic (2023). "The Emerald Tablet and the Origins of Chemistry". medievalists.net.
- Stapleton, H. E.; Lewis, G. L.; Taylor, F. Sherwood (1949). "The sayings of Hermes quoted in the Māʾ al-waraqī of Ibn Umail". Ambix. 3 (3–4): 69–90. doi:10.1179/amb.1949.3.3-4.69.
- Steele, Robert (1920). Secretum secretorum cum glossis et notulis. Opera hactenus inedita Rogeri Baconi, vol. V. Oxford: Clarendon Press. OCLC 493365693.
- Steele, Robert; Singer, Dorothea Waley (1927). "The Emerald Table". Proceedings of the Royal Society of Medicine. 21 (3): 41–57/485–501. doi:10.1177/003591572802100361. PMC 2101974. PMID 19986273.
- Stolzenberg, Daniel (2013). Egyptian Oedipus: Athanasius Kircher and the Secrets of Antiquity. Chicago: University of Chicago Press. ISBN 978-0-226-92414-4.
- Telle, Joachim (1984). "Paracelselsistische Sinnbildkunst: Bemerkungen zu einer pseudo-„Tabula Smaragdina" des 16. Jahrhunderts" [Paracelsian Symbolic Art: Remarks on a Pseudo-"Tabula Smaragdina" of the 16th Century]. In Seidler, Eduard; Schott, Heinz (eds.). Bausteine zur Medizingeschichte [Building Blocks of Medical History] (in German). Wiesbaden: Steiner. pp. 129–139.
- Telle, Joachim (1988). "L'art symbolique paracelsien: remarques concernant une pseudo-Tabula smaragdine du XVI^{e} siècle" [Paracelsian Symbolic Art: Remarks on a Pseudo-Tabula Smaragdina of the 16th Century]. In Faivre, Antoine (ed.). Hermès et l'hermétisme [Hermes and Hermetism] (in French). Éditions Albin Michel. pp. 184–222.
- Thorndike, Lynn (1959). "John of Seville". Speculum. 34 (1): 20–38. doi:10.2307/2847976. ISSN 0038-7134. JSTOR 2847976. PMID 19928638.
- Treece, David (2021). "Música Popular Black and anti-racist struggles: musical cosmopolitanism and the soul aesthetic in Brazil (1963–1978)". Brasiliana: Journal for Brazilian Studies. 10 (2): 412–433. doi:10.25160/bjbs.v10i2.128090.
- Trismosin, Salomon (1600). Aurei velleris Oder der Güldin Schatz und Kunstkammer [Golden Fleece, or the Golden Treasure and Art Chamber] (in German). Switzerland: Rorschach – via e-rara.ch.
- Tzu-Kung, Chang (1972). "Taoist Thought and the Development of Science: A Missing Chapter in the History of Science and Culture-Relations". M & B Pharmaceutical Bulletin. 21 (7, 20). May & Baker Ltd.
- Ullmann, Manfred (1980). "[Review of] Weisser 1979". Journal for the History of Arabic Science (in German). 4: 91–94. ISSN 0379-2927.
- Ullmann, Manfred (1981). "[Review of] Weisser 1980". Journal for the History of Arabic Science (in German). 5: 121–126. ISSN 0379-2927.
- Ibn Umayl, Muḥammad (1933). Ṭurāb ʿAlī, Muḥammad (ed.). Three Arabic Treatises on Alchemy. Memoirs of the Asiatic Society of Bengal. Vol. 12. Translated by Stapleton, H. E.; Hidāyat Ḥusain, Muḥammad. Calcutta: Asiatic Society of Bengal. pp. 1–213.
- Velly, Jean-Jacques (2001). Le dessous des notes : voies vers l'ésosthétique. Hommage au professeur Manfred Kelkel [Beneath the Notes: Paths Toward Esosthetics. Tribute to Professor Manfred Kelkel] (in French). Paris: Presses Paris Sorbonne. p. 442. ISBN 2-84050-209-7.
- Weisser, Ursula (1979). Buch über das Geheimnis der Schöpfung und die Darstellung der Natur (Buch der Ursachen) von Pseudo-Apollonios von Tyana [Book on the Secret of Creation and the Representation of Nature (Book of Causes) by Pseudo-Apollonius of Tyana]. Sources and Studies in the History of Arabic-Islamic Science. Aleppo: Institute for the History of Arabic Science. OCLC 13597803.
- Weisser, Ursula (1980). Spies, Otto (ed.). Das "Buch über das Geheimnis der Schöpfung" von Pseudo-Apollonios von Tyana ["The Book on the Secret of Creation" by Pseudo-Apollonius of Tyana]. Berlin: De Gruyter. doi:10.1515/9783110866933. ISBN 978-3-11-086693-3.
- Williams, K. L. (2016). "Turning Toward Earth: Themes, Sources, and Influences in the Emerald Tablet". Psychological Perspectives. 59 (1): 71–80. doi:10.1080/00332925.2016.1134208.
- Zirnis, Peter (1979). The Kitāb Usṭuqus al-uss of Jābir ibn Ḥayyān (Unpublished PhD diss.). New York University.
