= Gregorian Bivolaru =

Romanian yoga guru (born 1952)

Gregorian Bivolaru also known as Magnus Aurolsson and nicknamed Grieg, Grig or, by the press, Guru (born 1952) is a Romanian tantric yoga guru, and the founder of the Movement for Spiritual Integration into the Absolute (MISA). At the age of 18 he began teaching yoga, an activity deprecated by Romania's communist regime. He was twice jailed and once forcibly hospitalized in a psychiatric ward under the regime, which ended in 1989. In 2005 he was charged on counts of sexual exploitation, tax evasion, and crossing the border to escape prosecution; he sought asylum in Sweden, which he was granted in 2006. In 2008 he was expelled from the European Yoga Council. His trial in Romania for human trafficking was postponed many times; charges in another trial were dropped. In 2013, he was sentenced in absentia by Romania's supreme court for sex with a minor. In 2016 he was arrested in France and extradited to Romania. He was paroled in 2017 and fled the country, by then wanted by the police in Finland and France for human trafficking. He was arrested and imprisoned in France in 2023.

MISA teaches a combination of yoga and tantra. The teachings derive from multiple religious sources such as Hinduism, Kashmir Shaivism, and Western esotericism. The tantra teaching is oriented towards sexual practices. A principle of polarity is emphasized, with male and female as fundamentally opposite energies of the universe. MISA's practices include purifications, use of pornography, and sexual activity between teachers and pupils. Some female students have been taken to France, arriving disoriented and without passports or mobile phones at Bivolaru's apartment, where they had ritualized sex with Bivolaru, and were then taken away and forced to do sex work such as working as webcam models under harsh conditions. It was held to be an honour to have sex with the guru as this denoted spiritual progress.

Bivolaru has received hostile treatment in the media in Romania and elsewhere, with descriptions of his beliefs and practices. He has written a book describing a variant of Freemasonry as a satanic conspiracy seeking world domination. He has claimed to have contacted extraterrestrials with healing powers.

== Biography ==
=== Early life ===
Gregorian Bivolaru was born in 1952 in Tărtășești, Ilfov County, (now in Dâmbovița County), in the Muntenia region of Romania. He completed high school in Bucharest, and joined a predecessor to the Bucharest Metro company as an unskilled labourer in 1971. He began practicing yoga at the age of 17, and began to teach it at the age of 18. He became interested in Eastern spirituality and read Mircea Eliade's scholarly writings on yoga, corresponding with the author. He managed to obtain and read books by Paramahansa Yogananda, Sivananda Saraswati, and Ramakrishna, even though these were not readily available in Romania at the time. The claim that Bivolaru had a correspondence with Eliade is not supported by Eliade's archive.

During the communist regime Bivolaru was kept under observation by the Department of State Security, since he was 19 years old, because he asked for pornography from foreign countries, he spread pornography (which was illegal), and, later, because he was practicing and teaching yoga, yoga being dissuaded in Romania and barred from public facilities in 1982, in connection with the "Transcendental Meditation scandal". He was jailed twice and forcibly hospitalized in a psychiatric ward once.

In 1977, he was arrested on the charge of distributing pornography and sentenced to one year in prison, but he did not complete it due to an amnesty granted for minor convictions by the President of Romania Nicolae Ceaușescu on his birthday. On 17 April 1984, he was arrested again for distributing pornographic materials.

On 17 August 1989, Bivolaru was arrested again, on the grounds that he was mentally unhinged and a menace to the general public. Prosecutors requested he be hospitalized, which was granted two days later on 19 August 1989 by the sector 1 Tribunal of Bucharest based on a report submitted by National Institute for Legal Medicine (IML). He was sentenced to hospitalization at The Poiana Mare Neuropsychiatry Hospital in Dolj County. In the IML report the diagnosis was schizoid personality disorder and paranoia with obsessive-phobic elements. Until 1989 he was constantly on the list of the most dangerous people for the communist regime, being permanently in the sights of the Security, but he never stopped practicing and teaching yoga. His group of yogis is according to Gabriel Andreescu "the only example of long-lasting collective resistance under Nicolae Ceaușescu's regime".

=== Legal history ===
In 2005, Bivolaru was charged in Romania on eight counts, including sexual exploitation, tax evasion, and illegally crossing the border to escape prosecution. In March 2005, he asked for asylum in Sweden, claiming that he feared persecution in Romania. On 15 April the Romanian Police issued a second warrant in his name, accusing him of "human trafficking and other charges related to organized crime" (related to an alleged sequestration of people in some ashrams and forcing them to work without being paid). The Swedish Immigration Authority granted Bivolaru political asylum from 2 January 2006. In 2008, Bivolaru and everyone linked to MISA or Natha were expelled from the European Yoga Council, where he had been an honorary member. In 2010, Bivolaru requested damages from the Romanian state for his sentencing to mandatory psychiatric treatment during the Communist regime. On 18 January 2011, Bivolaru's trial was, for the tenth time, postponed again until 23 March 2011, marking his case as one of the longest-running in the Cluj court. This trial for human trafficking is still pending, but the unconstitutionality exceptions invoked by the suspects have been rejected. On 1 July 2011, a Bucharest court issued a ruling recognizing the political nature of the sentences suffered by Bivolaru during the communist period and his internment. In another 2011 trial, at the Sibiu court, the charges were dropped, partly due to lack of evidence for some charges (evidence was dropped for failing to show that the interceptions were legally mandated), and partly due to exceeding the statute of limitations corresponding to the charges.

In 2012, MISA faced allegations of procuring and forced prostitution. In 2013, the High Court of Cassation and Justice of Romania convicted and sentenced Bivolaru in absentia to six years in prison, without suspension, for sexual acts with a minor, who said she never had sexual relations with Bivolaru. On the same day, Court Judge Ionuț Matei received a letter threatening him and his family. In 2016, Bivolaru was arrested in France. After extradition from France, he was imprisoned in Romania. He requested a retrial. His six-year term was reduced by one year and three months, since he had already spent this time in detention. Alba Iulia Court of Appeals had rejected Bivolaru's demand for a retrial. In 2017, Bivolaru was released from prison on parole. Soon after being paroled, Bivolaru fled the country. He was wanted by the police in Finland and France for human trafficking between 2008 and 2013, for sexual abuse, and other crimes. In 2023 he was wanted by Interpol for aggravated trafficking in human beings and sexual assault at the request of Finland. He was arrested in France on 28 November 2023. Bivolaru and five other people belonging to MISA were placed under provisional arrest. They were accused of financial exploitation, under the guise of Tantra (sexual exploitation). Bivolaru thinks he is "the victim of a political conspiracy", who would have retaliated against him for "fighting against a gigantic planetary satanic and freemasonic conspiracy". This has long been the official creed of Bivolaru and MISA.

In 2023, MISA faced again allegations of procuring and forced prostitution. He was accused of exploiting female adepts for sexual contacts and luring them into performing in pornography, including by secretly recording them for such purposes. In Finland the charges he faces are punishable with ten years imprisonment. In France he faces charges punishable with 30 years imprisonment. The other five persons still in prison at this time face charges punishable with 15 years imprisonment. He was imprisoned in France in 2023 for what was alleged to be a rape, human trafficking and kidnapping scheme. According to Le Monde, "At the eight locations they visited, the police found 58 women – 51 of Romanian nationality, none French – 'living in difficult conditions, with severe overcrowding and no privacy'". Each woman in the villa of Bivolaru's right-hand man from France had a room of three square meters, and the hygiene conditions were poor. They were malnourished. Many of the women arrested on 28 November 2023 were inebriated.

In 2024 German authorities opened an investigation regarding MISA/ATMAN. The authorities have expressed doubts about the success of such investigation, since Germany does not have the same laws as France. At the end of April 2024, the French authorities arrested the wife of Bivolaru's right-hand man. Bivolaru will receive payment for damages, for a 17-year trial in Romania, a duration which was ruled excessive in 2024. Two of his close associates from the EU were arrested in August or September 2024 (according to different reports) in Georgia. When they were arrested, they had half million Euro. The article from Marianne links them and other MISA leaders to an infamous cult, Ashram Shambala from Russia. Agence France-Presse said that 15 persons were indicted in 2023 on this matter. As of October 2024 the investigation continued, finding brothels linked to Bivolaru/MISA in France, Monaco, and Italy. He faces accusations of organized crime. The trial is scheduled for 2026 or 2027. The head of the French CAIMADES police unit which investigates cult abuse stated that its task is to investigate crimes, not religious beliefs. The defense argues the sex was in relationships between freely consenting adults. According to Le Parisien, in June 2026 seven women became civil parties in the criminal trial, and Bivolaru argues that it is a conspiracy. According to what he says, he is physically ill, sexually unfit, and fears he will die in prison. He described his confinement in isolation as torture.

== MISA ==
Official hostility to yoga ended with the Romanian Revolution of 1989. Bivolaru founded the Movement for Spiritual Integration into the Absolute (MISA) as a non-profit association in 1990. MISA currently operates under different names in different countries: Natha in Denmark, Sweden, and Portugal, Tara in the US and UK, and Satya in India. It is also known as the Atman Federation.

The tantric yoga organization MISA (Movement for Spiritual Integration in Absolute) has become one of the most successful European yoga schools. The teachings of MISA present a doctrine of synthesis wherein elements from Orthodox Christianity, esoteric Traditionalism, conspiracy theories and New Age ideas are combined with Tantric philosophy and practice.

— Lewis and Tøllefsen (2015)

A follower of MISA became prime-minister.

=== Teachings ===
MISA teaches a combination of yoga and tantra. Courses in these two subjects, the "Intensive Yoga Course" (IYC) and "Intensive Tantra Course" (ITC) each span two years, requiring at least two hours a week of home study, and can be taken concurrently. MISA describes its teaching in secular terms, but according to scholar of religion Zdenek Vojtíšek, it demands changes to lifestyle, investment of time, and commitment to the organization more like a religion than a leisure activity. Vojtíšek states that MISA makes itself available socially, while gradually introducing doctrines that it calls secret.

The sociologist Massimo Introvigne states that the teachings derive from many religious sources, including Buddhism, Hinduism, Sufism, Tantra, and Taoism, as well as Esoteric Christianity and Western esotericism. The selected teachings are removed from their cultural and historical contexts and presented as esoteric elements of a single truth. One such element is a belief in benevolent extra-terrestrial aliens. Introvigne states that the core of MISA's teaching is Tantrism, especially that of the medieval Kashmir Shaivism philosopher Abhinavagupta.

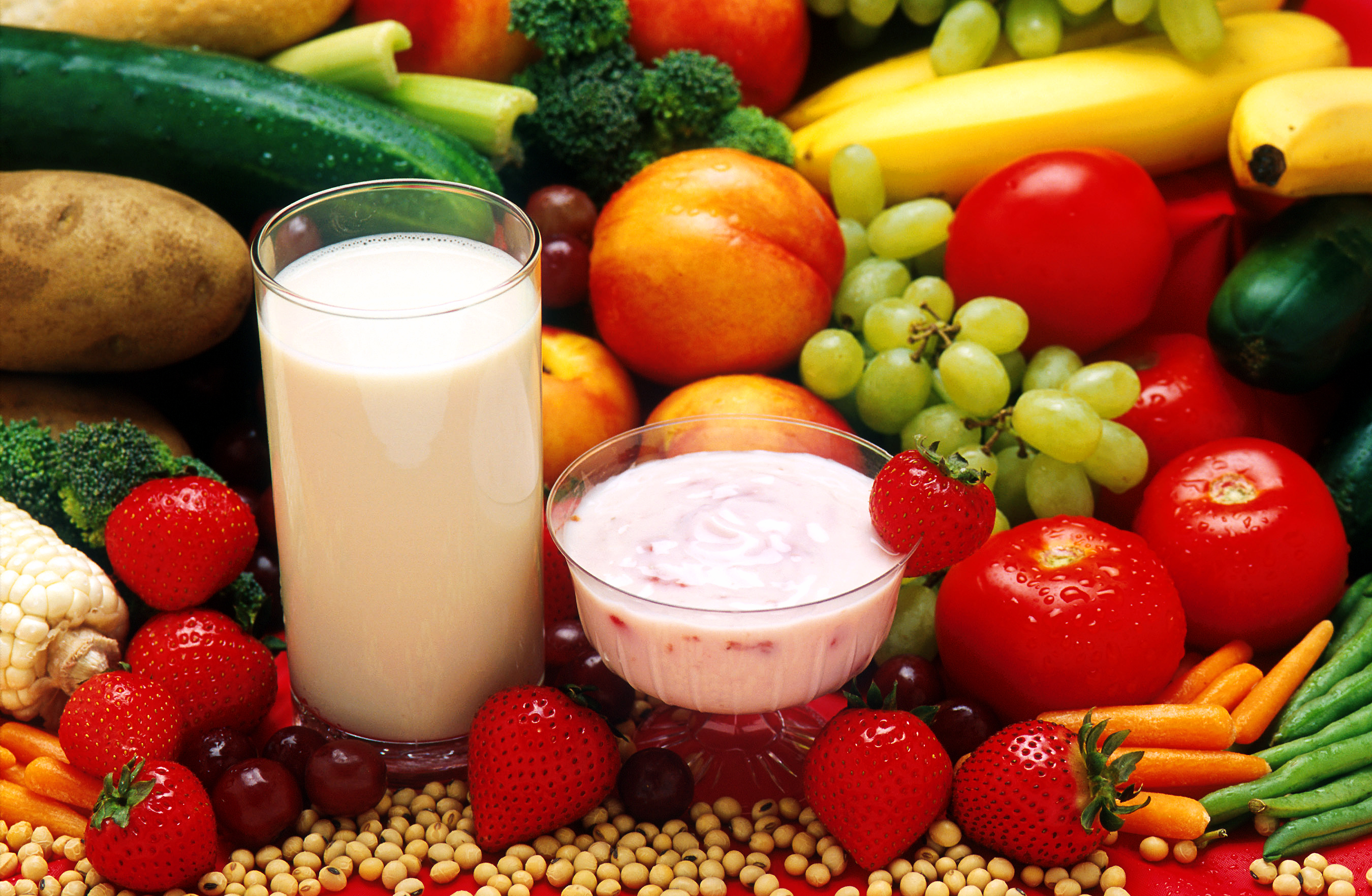
Students are encouraged to take up a lactovegetarian diet.

The Intensive Yoga Course material is a text containing diverse materials. Yoga is defined as "a traditional, practical, and philosophical system" deriving from Patanjali's Yoga Sutras. The yoga teacher and scholar of religion Tova Olsson states that it is illustrated with poetry, Indian proverbs, "quasi-scientific drawings", and photographs of "photos of young men and women (in their underwear) performing āsanas". She comments that Patanjali is described as "holy", while the word "traditional" in her view emphasizes the essential form of Patanjali's yoga, while the text stresses the goal of attaining perfection through the practice. She adds that the words "authenticity" and "secret" are used repeatedly at the start, indicating that students will be initiated into "a great mystery" only available through MISA. Students are asked to take up a lactovegetarian diet, and to practice fasting.

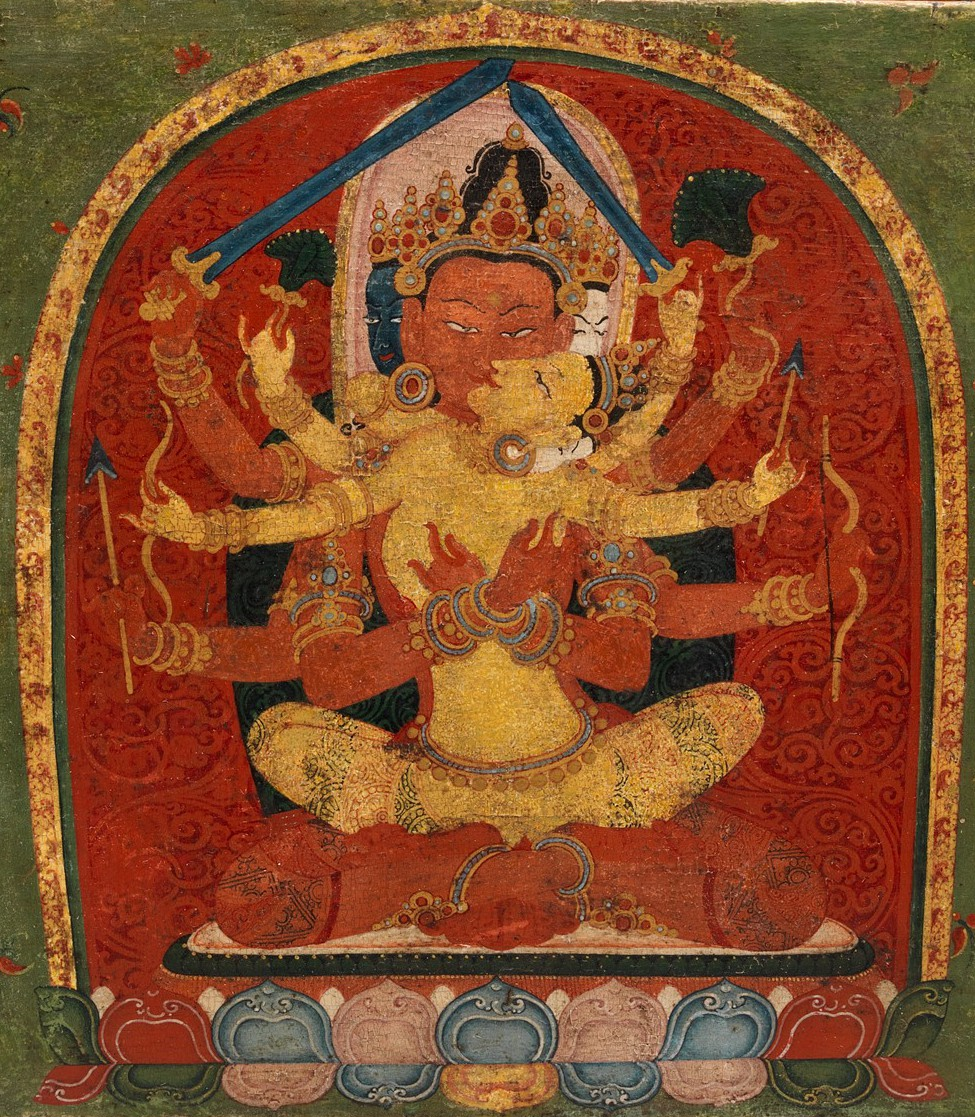
The Intensive Tantra Course is illustrated with a painting of deities embracing in Yab-Yum. (Book cover of Manjuvajra embracing his consort illustrated.)

The Intensive Tantra Course defines tantra as a "set of methods and instruments ... intended to obtain the expansion of consciousness or ... to create a network of conscious connections between elements of reality". It calls tantra "more famous than known", describing it variously as metaphysics, physics, science, and spirituality. The text dismisses the "Western" use of tantra's sexual techniques, but has in Olsson's words "an obvious (and original, as promised) leaning towards sexual practices." It is illustrated with paintings and photographs, usually one on each page of text. These begin with a painting of deities embracing in the Yab-Yum posture, and "become increasingly daring" as the course progresses. The photographs portray people in the Yab-Yum posture or in "orgasmic embrace", followed by "photos of naked, white, slender women with oiled skin and large breasts", often lying down in a natural setting; Olsson states that Bivolaru's book is similarly illustrated.

Both courses state a "law of resonance", with frequencies in the environment matching those within the yoga practitioner as a "law that governs the whole manifestation", since according to MISA the universe consists of vibrations. Olsson traces the idea that everything is vibrations, along with occult concepts such as "as above, so below" and the universality of gendered opposites to the 1908 esoteric book The Kybalion, likely written by William Walker Atkinson. She suggests that MISA uses the law of resonance to mean that "likeminded people attract", and conversely that students should avoid the influence of people of "lower frequency". In line with this, the IYC calls the chakras of the subtle body "resonators"; the right use of these supposedly enables students to gain supernatural powers.

The IYC advocates hatha yoga purifications such as washing the nose with salt water, later moving on to asanas, such as shavasana and Bhujangasana, one at a time: Olsson comments that this contrasts sharply with the many asanas practised in a typical session of yoga as exercise. These are related to specific chakras and attributed specific physical or quasi-medical benefits, as well as spiritual benefits and the ability to control sexual energy. Knowledge of the chakras is described as secret, belied, Olsson notes, by the ready availability of materials and courses on them, perhaps leading the way towards acceptance of abusive behaviour.

The ITC teaches the principle of polarity, between the male deity Shiva and the female Shakti, his consort. These are presented as opposites, constituting a fundamental principle of energy in the universe. Along with more photographs and drawings of naked men and women, the text introduces the concept of ojas or "fluid light" as the "seminal energy of man" in male and female sexual fluids.

Olsson summarizes MISA's teachings as "an eclectic religious worldview, where yogic techniques and Bible passages intermingle with disciplined life-choices, nudity, a sense of exclusivity and a fair share of gender essentialism." The teachings are supported with quotations from authority figures, nearly all men, from Pythagoras to Rousseau and Sivananda. The stress on secrecy, too, she notes, is belied by published translations of hatha yoga texts such as the Haṭha Yoga Pradīpikā and the Gheraṇḍa Saṃhitā.

=== Practices ===
==== Across the organization ====
In 2009, Finnish broadcasting company Yle aired a program on MISA and Bivolaru, interviewing ex-Natha members. Natha is described as being rooted in the MISA movement. The interviewees described controversial activities like vomiting for purification, the use of pornography, and sexual relations between teachers and pupils. A representative of Finnish Natha commented that sex is always a matter between the two persons. Seppo Isotalo, a human rights activist who tried to help MISA in confrontation with Romanian authorities, described MISA as having "all the characteristics of a cult: one truth, one leader, and it isolates the dissident."

In 2011 MISA was involved in a scandal in Argentina described as "porno-yoga". In 2012 MISA was involved in a sexual slavery scandal in Italy, but 10 years later no prosecutions had been brought. The Italian court granted MISA/ATMAN the benefit of the doubt (whether there was valid consent was owing to doubt). The lengthy trial of MISA members on charges of "Trafficking in human beings and conspiracy to commit crimes", which took place in Romania, was concluded after 17 years. Nobody was found guilty. Equally, by 2021 there had been no official charges of pimping. MISA has been described as "a group reminiscent of the Mafia and pimping disguised as philosophy", and as organized crime. It is organized compartmentally, according to a general operating principle of organized crime.

Some MISA ashrams close to Bivolaru, hidden from the main teaching schools, are said to function as brothels, while the journalist Bogdan Comaroni stated that children born in ashrams are sometimes sold to pedophiles. Comaroni stated that many local politicians, policemen and prosecutors from Romania were clients of MISA prostitutes. According to Comaroni, Bivolaru built a real estate financial empire based on pimping and money laundering. In 2014, Bivolaru earned four million euros from annual membership fees. In December 2023, MISA counted a hundred thousand adepts worldwide. Another source in 2024 said it had 40,000 adepts in 34 countries.

==== Sex with Bivolaru ====
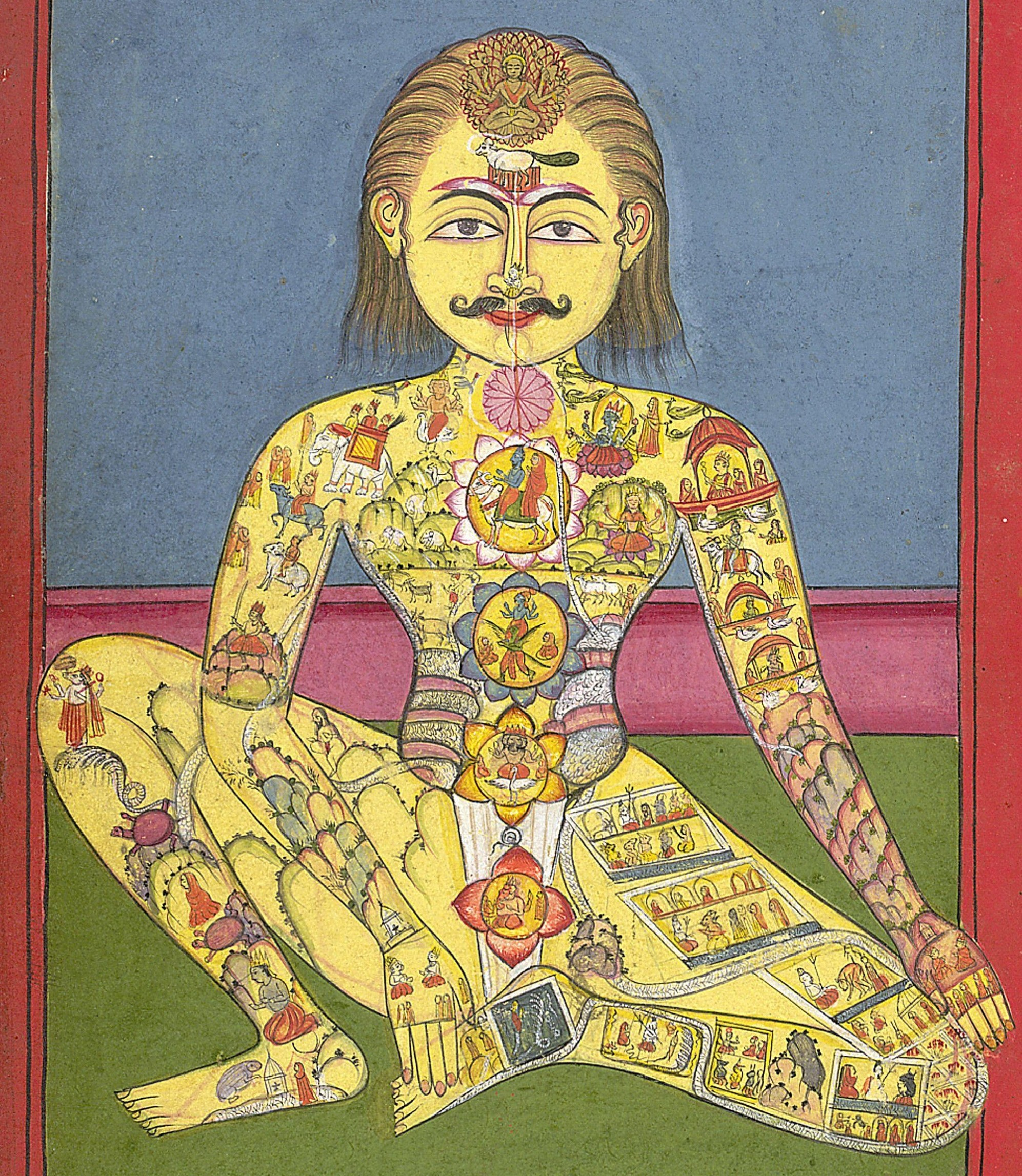
MISA teaches that each of seven penetrative sexual positions corresponds to one of seven chakras in the subtle body. A depiction of the body with seven chakras.

In 2023 Bivolaru and MISA were involved in a sexual slavery and human trafficking scandal in France. 30 years prison sentences were on the table. In France, various women were deprived of passports, of mobile phones, they were transported blindfolded so that they would not know where they were, they were rarely allowed to communicate with their parents, and then only under supervision, they were forced to sign formal statements that they had sex and viewed porn of their own free will, and they were allowed no clothes except for women's underwear. A witness interviewed by RTL confirms such reports: in one year since joining MISA she had to perform sex work. A witness interviewed by the BBC reported the same treatment in Paris. This began with days waiting in a blacked-out room in Bivolaru's apartment and seeing other women in states of distress. Once called to Bivolaru's bedroom, sex began with a consecration ritual, lengthy foreplay by Bivolaru, seven penetrative sex positions, each supposedly mapped to one of the seven chakras, and forced drinking of urine directly from the urethra. This was immediately followed by supervised transportation from Paris to Prague, with six months forced work in the "Garden of Miracles" as an erotic webcam model under harsh conditions. There were fines for offences as minor as leaving the refrigerator door open or a plate unwashed. According to a lecture at the University of Lausanne, yoga is the front, and human trafficking is the practice.

A Vice article reports that "as a MISA female member, it was an honour to have sex with guru Gregorian, because it meant positive karma and spiritual progress". (Note: Literally translated from Romanian: "to be beaten by" instead of "to have sex with".) The BBC confirms that sex with Gregorian was held to "burn [bad] karma". One woman they interviewed said that she felt repulsed by him, but accepted having sex, telling herself according to her MISA training that "this is a spiritual master – transfigure him [with tantric sex]."

Bivolaru and MISA are fiercely against homosexuality, but they have no objection to lesbianism, which they even promote during Tantric initiation: underage virgins first had to submit to sex with women before having sex with Bivolaru. One woman stated in court that she was sexually exploited by Bivolaru, losing her virginity to him while she was only 15. Before being deflowered by Bivolaru she was allegedly initiated through "lesbian acts with a dozen other women". A German witness described how Bivolaru raped a 16-year-old Hungarian girl.

== Analysis ==
=== Validity of mental health diagnoses ===
The validity of Bivolaru's mental health diagnoses has been debated. A psychologist friend of Bivolaru, when asked by a young girl in 1993 about attending Bivolaru's courses, advised her to stay clear of him because he was a "psychopath". In 2012 two courts acknowledged that Bivolaru was sentenced and jailed for political reasons during the communist regime. Cecilia Tiz, a yoga teacher formerly associated with MISA, stated in 2016 that "Bivolaru is a sick man who needs therapy". During his 2016 extradition procedures, Bivolaru pleaded irresponsible by reason of being legally insane, although the French court refused to pass judgment upon his being insane, since that was not germane to extradition procedures. One of his lawyers publicly declared at the time of the trial that "He has become paranoid, he is fearful of everything." However, the doctor at Poiana Mare in charge of Bivolaru, Leonard Hriscu, declared that "Gregorian Bivolaru was not a man in need of psychiatric treatment." A Romanian court recognized in 2011 that his forced commitment to a psychiatric clinic was political abuse.

Bivolaru has stated that he was unfairly persecuted, just as Jesus Christ was unjustly crucified. In 2023, he was acquitted after 17 years of trial. The name "Operation Christ" was given to the case by prosecutors. The French newspaper Libération took his comparison of himself with Jesus Christ as evidence of megalomania. As of 2026 French psychiatrists think he is not mentally ill, but he is psychologically rigid, with a tendency towards megalomania.

=== In the media ===
In the 1990s and the 2000s, there was a media campaign in Romania against Bivolaru and MISA, which Romanian journalist Ion Cristoiu and professor Gabriel Andreescu regarded as persecution; Andreescu said it was sensationalism to sell newspapers, while Cristoiu suspected that the Social Democratic Party was aiming to appease conservative voters. Liviu Bordaș attributes the campaign to the understanding between the post-communist state and the Romanian Orthodox Church.

Bivolaru flirted with the purportedly Hindu myth (Note: In fact it was a Chinese myth.) of having sex with a thousand virgins, hoping to reach the heights of spiritual power. In 2006, Bivolaru was elected as the no. 20 of the 100 Greatest Romanians Ever, according to TVR (TV network).

An article in Huffington Post called MISA a "dangerous personality cult", stating that Bivolaru had led "hundreds of vulnerable women" into making hard-core porn videos, leaving their husbands, or working as prostitutes and strippers. It stated that the purpose of this was to "liberat[e] the female body", allowing participants to commune with the "Divine Goddess." It further reported that Bivolaru and others in the MISA hierarchy had "sex with underage girls, some in their early teens", and that young women did "karma yoga", meaning that they were sent to countries such as Japan "to work as pole dancers and strippers." "A year later, aged 16, [...] was one of around 300 women parading naked at a 'Miss Shakti' beauty pageant on the Black Sea, with some even masturbating on stage in front of thousands of onlookers."

In one of his books, Bivolaru claims Freemasonry is a satanic conspiracy trying to achieve world domination via the establishment of a world masonic government, a world kingdom, as well as a unique world religion. Bivolaru claims to have contact with extraterrestrials who have healing powers and they will help humanity during its "difficult moments". His publications have been described as "conspiracy theory writings having paranoid ideas". E.g., he accused freemasons of colluding with evil extraterrestrials in order to exterminate people, then "Grieg continues his expose by stating that homosexuality is also spread by the freemasons" in order to break their connection with God. Bivolaru finds "that Freemasonry is the source of all the evils of the modern world."

Bivolaru gained a bad reputation in Romania in the 1990s, through advising his adepts to drink urine, both as urine therapy and as paraphilia, while the scholar of religion Zdeněk Vojtíšek says that is a vanilla mystical ritual in some religions. Vojtíšek stated in 2018 that Bivolaru sexually initiates women in an atmosphere of secrecy and drinking urine, but concluded that the bad press which MISA had is due to an unavoidable misunderstanding. According to Crikey, "women were coerced into gaining weight to conform to Bivolaru's tastes."

At the end of 2024, Andreescu condemned the 2023 Police raid from France. Bivolaru is currently in custody in France awaiting trial and in March 2026 was the subject of the three-part Apple TV documentary, "Twisted Yoga."

== See also ==
- List of fugitives from justice who disappeared
- Sexual abuse by yoga gurus
- Agama Yoga
