= As Above, So Below =

As Above, So Below is the title of various creative works named after the popular Hermetic maxim "As above, so below":

== Film and television ==
- As Above, So Below (film), a 2014 American horror film
- "As Above, So Below" (Neverwhere), a 1996 television episode

== Music ==
- As Above, So Below (Forced Entry album), 1991
- As Above, So Below (Angel Witch album), 2012
- As Above So Below (Azure Ray EP), 2012
- As Above, So Below (Stonefield album), 2016
- As Above, So Below (Sampa the Great album), 2022
- As Above, So Below, a 1998 album by Barry Adamson
- As Above So Below, a 2011 album by Anthony David
- As Above, So Below, a 2016 album by Nightstalker
- "As Above So Below", a 2016 single by In Death It Ends
- As Above So Below, a 2020 album by Vinnie Paz
- As Above, So Below, a 2024 album by Highly Suspect
- "As Above So Below", a 2020 song by Phoenix Lord & Saggian featuring Emjay
- "As Above, So Below", a 2023 song by Essenger and Cryoshell
- "As Above, So Below", a song from Klaxons' album Myths of the Near Future, 2007
- "As Above, So Below", a song from Tom Tom Club's album Tom Tom Club, 1981
- "As Above, So Below", a song from the Comsat Angels' album Land, 1983
- "As Above, So Below", a song from Behemoth's album Zos Kia Cultus, 2002
- "As Above, So Below", a song from Yngwie Malmsteen's album Rising Force, 1984
- "As Above, So Below", a track from the soundtrack album of the film Zack Snyder's Justice League, 2021
- "As Above, So Below", an instrumental from Manfred Mann's Earth Band's album Nightingales & Bombers, 1975
- "All as Above So Below", a song from Hieroglyphics' album The Kitchen, 2013
- "As Above, So Below", a song from the Agonist's album Eye of Providence, 2015
- "As Above, So Below", a song from In This Moment's album Mother, 2020
- "As Above So Below", a song from Fievel Is Glauque's album Rong Weicknes, 2024
- "As Above", a song from Phoebe Bridgers' album Lost Weekend, 2026
- ”As Above So Below”, a 2026 song by Skaiwater
