= Alexander (magician) =

American spiritual author and magician (1880–1954)

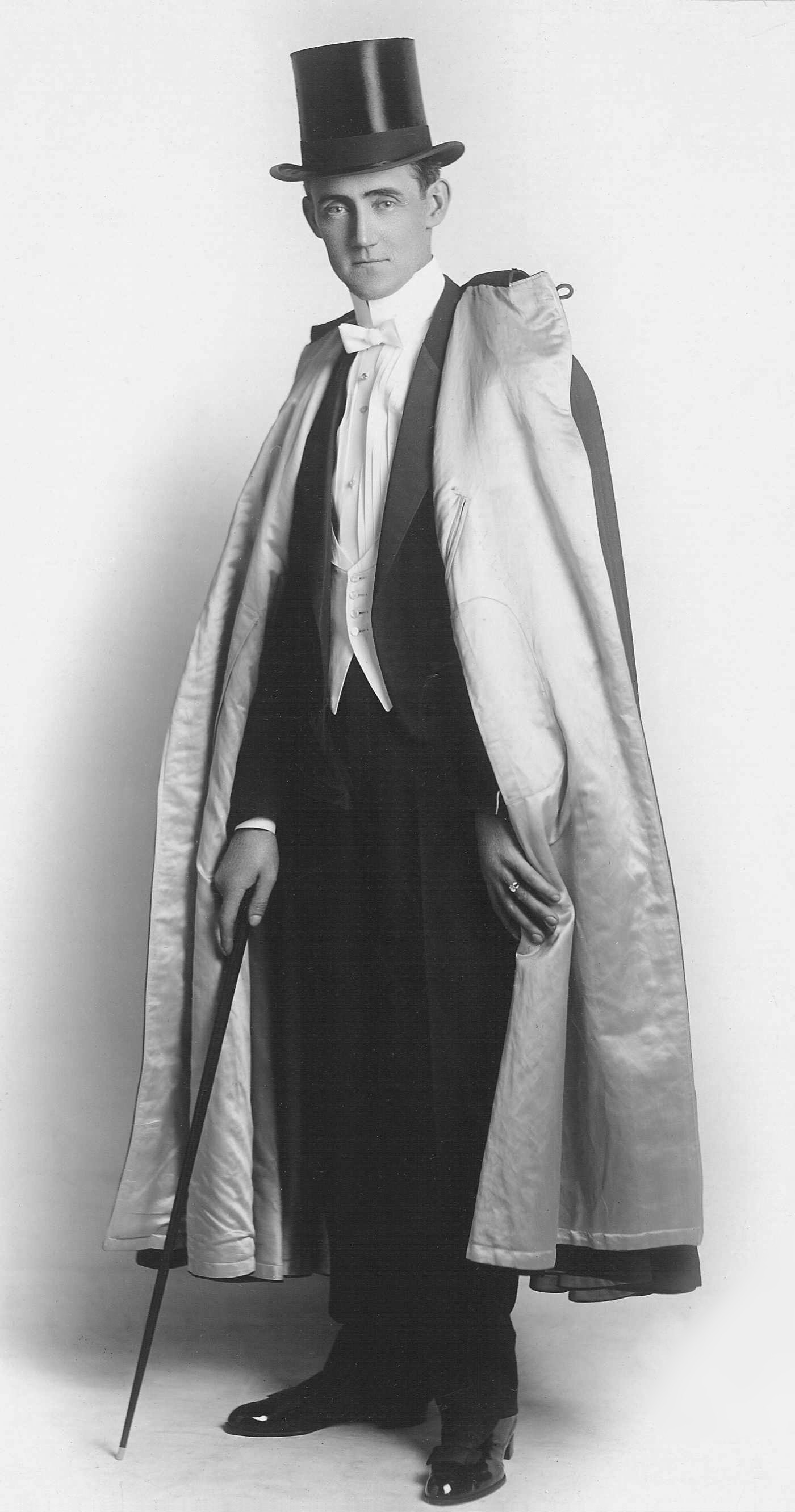
- Conlin circa 1915
- Born: Claude Alexander Conlin; June 30, 1880; Alexandria, South Dakota
- Died: August 5, 1954 (aged 74); Seattle, Washington
- Occupations: performer of stage magic, mentalism, and psychic reading; writer on magical illusions, New Thought, Spiritualism, and occultism.
- Children: Claude Alexander Conlin, Jr. (born 5 October 1916)

Claude Alexander Conlin (June 30, 1880 – August 5, 1954), also known as Alexander, C. Alexander, Alexander the Crystal Seer, and Alexander the Man Who Knows, was an American spiritual author, vaudeville magician who specialized in mentalism and psychic reading acts, dressed in Oriental style robes and a feathered turban, and often used a crystal ball as a prop. In addition to performing, he also worked privately for clients, giving readings. He was the author of several pitch books, New Thought pamphlets, and psychology books, as well as texts for stage performers. His stage name was "Alexander", and as an author he wrote under the name "C. Alexander".

== Life and stage career ==
Alexander was born on June 30, 1880, in Alexandria, South Dakota, the son of Berthold Michael James Conlin and Martha Michaels. Within the family Claude Alexander was known as "C. A." and his brother Clarence Berthold Conlin was known as "C. B." Clarence B. had a successful career as an attorney and he also worked as a stage mentalist, although his fame never equalled that of Claude Alexander.

Between 1915 and 1924, Conlin, under the stage name "Alexander, The Man Who Knows", was a popular and highly paid stage mentalist. Alexander promoted his psychic act as a form of mental telepathy or mind reading. Audience members gave him sealed questions, which he answered from the stage after staring into a crystal ball. His techniques were not revealed during his lifetime. Alexander is credited as the inventor and/or popular developer of a number of electrical stage effects which were the forerunners of modern electronic stage effects. For example, his assistants would covertly obtain information about audience members and then transmit that information to an earpiece that was hidden under Alexander's turban.

All of Alexander's biographers, Darryl Beckmann, David Charvet, and Alexander's biographer of the 1940s, Robert A. Nelson, have said that Alexander was the highest-paid mentalist in the world at the height of his career, during the 1920s. Both sources state that he earned multiple millions of dollars during his career on stage and that during his lifetime he may have been the highest paid entertainer in the field of magic. Alexander retired from the stage in 1927, at the age of 47. He remained part of the social circles of entertainment personalities in Southern California, counting among his friends stars like Marion Davies, Margaret Sullavan, Jackie Coogan, Harold Lloyd, and Clara Bow.

== Death ==
Alexander died on August 5, 1954, at the age of 74 due to complications from an operation for stomach ulcers. He was survived by two sons and a daughter. He was buried in Seattle, Washington.

Alexander's career and personal life have long been shrouded in mystery. However, interviews with his son and the scrapbooks of the Nartel twins have uncovered many details. In the late 20th century, Clarence's granddaughter Cathy Stevenson inherited scrapbook material on the careers of both her grandfather "C. B." and great-uncle "C. A.", which allowed Charvet to take a closer look at the life of Alexander the Crystal Seer and his family.

== New Thought and spiritualism beliefs ==
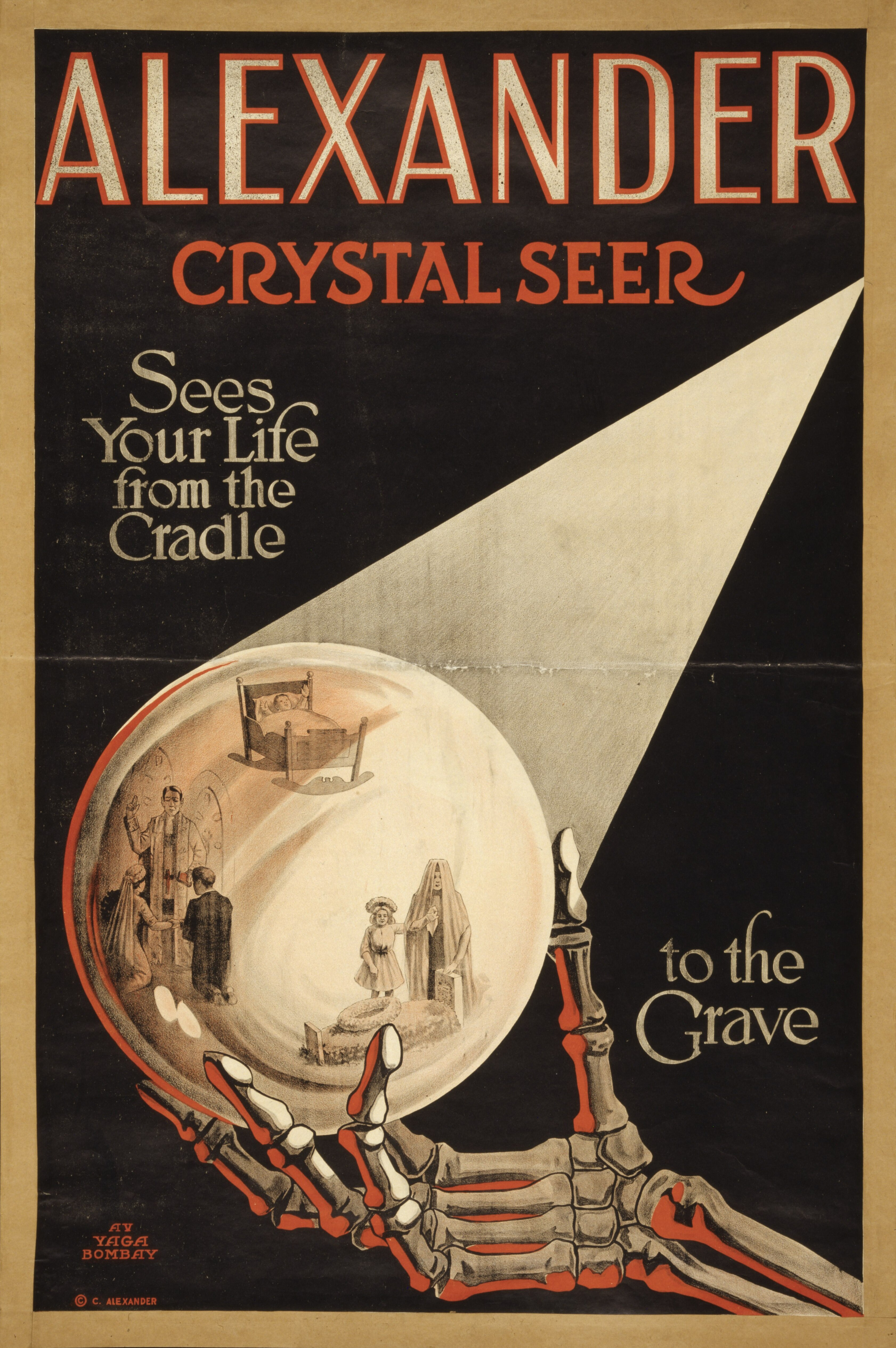
1910 poster: "Alexander, Crystal Seer, Sees Your Life from the Cradle to the Grave"

With respect to the question of psychic phenomena, magic, spiritualism, and the occult, Alexander led a sort of double life, especially after he retired from the stage. In 1921, he wrote and published The Life and Mysteries of The Celebrated Dr. Q (also known as The Dr. Q. Book), which was later re-published by Nelson Enterprises of Columbus, Ohio, for the stage magic trade. In this book, Alexander exposed the techniques used by fraudulent spiritualist mediums to dupe their clients, provided blueprints for the manufacture of psychic act stage props, and even revealed the famous "Zancig Code" pioneered by the mentalists Julius and Agnes Zancig.

On the other hand, like the Zancigs, he never completely discounted the possibility that Spiritualism might contain elements of truth, and from 1919 onward he also operated a publishing house, the C. Alexander Publishing Company in Los Angeles, California, which released his own astrological, pro-Spiritualist, and New Thought material, including a 5-volume series called The Inner Secrets of Psychology and a booklet for his students titled Personal Lessons, Codes, and Instructions for Members of the Crystal Silence League. The latter is a manual that explains the technique of affirmative prayer, and presents methods for the development of Spiritualistic mediumship, and divination through crystal ball scrying. The back cover displays Alexander's connection to the New Thought movement, for it lists an extensive array of titles that Alexander offered for sale at his book shop, including works written and published by the New Thought author William Walker Atkinson under his own name and also under the pseudonyms Theron Q. Dumont, Yogi Ramacharaka, and Swami Panchadasi; as well as a book by Atkinson's sometime co-author, the occultist L. W. de Laurence.

== Controversy ==
The biographer David Charvet, who interviewed surviving members of Alexander's family, wrote that Alexander had "seven marriages (sometimes to more than one woman at once)." The biographer Darryl Beckmann wrote that Alexander was "married eleven times." In a later interview with Charvet in 2006, Conlin's then-89-year-old son, John, claimed that Alexander was actually married 14 times.

Charvet recounts in his biography that Alexander spent time in local jails (including a jail break in Oklahoma in 1906) and federal prison in Washington state, went on trial for attempting to extort $50,000 from oilman millionaire G. Allan Hancock, made a failed attempt to outrun the authorities in a high-powered speedboat loaded with bootlegged liquor in the Queen Charlotte Strait between Canada and the U.S., and admitted to killing four men. Alexander himself claimed that he was involved in the shooting of Alaska gold rush con-man Jefferson "Soapy" Smith. No evidence of his involvement exists, nor is he mentioned in the context of Smith's death in the thorough historical biography on Smith's life and death.

According to Beckmann, Alexander was a "con-man" as well as a stage performer. A newspaper account in which it was stated that Alexander shot and killed a street mugger who attacked him, and was let off on the grounds of self-defense, was cited by Charvet.

== Legacy ==
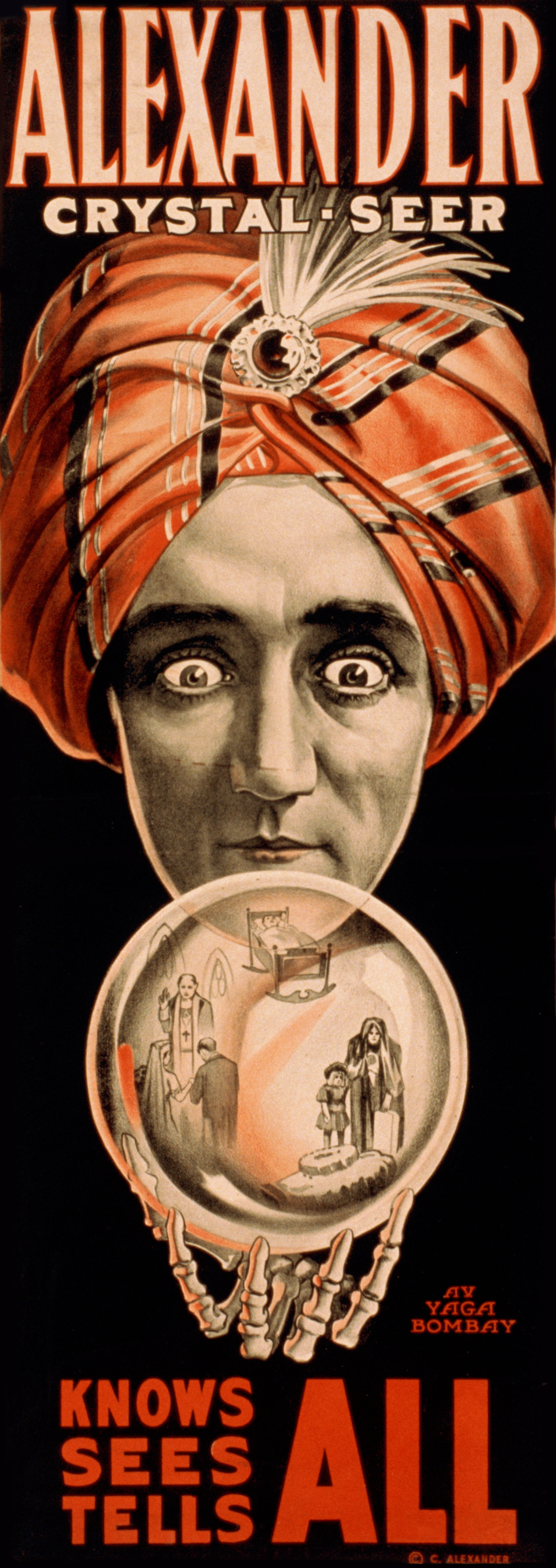
Poster for Alexander's show with crystal ball

Alexander invested a great deal of money into the production and printing of beautiful chromolithograph posters for his stage show. When he retired from the stage, he kept these in storage and eventually sold the unused posters and all of his stage equipment and props to a magic dealer, Robert Nelson, in Ohio in 1944. Nelson in turn sold portions of the stage show and many of the posters to another magician, Leon Mandrake, who toured in the Pacific Northwest during the 1950s under Alexander's name in order to make use of the large supply of full-color posters. Thus, those who saw a show by "Alexander" in the 1950s actually were witnessing a recreation performance by Mandrake. Alexander was mentioned by name in a 1950s episode of the NBC television production Playhouse 90 called "The Great Sebastians", starring Alfred Lunt and Lynn Fontanne as a pair of stage magicians who resembled his old friends The Zancigs.

== Bibliography ==
- "Alexander - The Man Who Knows", (Revised, second edition) David Charvet. Mike Caveney's Magic Words, Pasadena, CA. 2007.
- "Alexander The Man Who Knows", A Personal Scrapbook, Rolling Bay Press, Rollingbay WA 1994.
- Alexander Wednesday, May 15 at 5 p.m.: The Man Who Knows, C. Alexander Publishing Co., Los Angeles, California, n.d. (c. 1913 – 1920).
- Personal Lessons, Codes, and Instructions for Members of the Crystal Silence League, C. Alexander Publishing Co., Los Angeles, California, n.d. (c. 1913). Reprinted by Missionary Independent Spiritual Church, 2011.
- Crystal Gazing: Lessons and Instructions in Silent Influence With the Crystal, Written Especially for and Dedicated to Members of The Crystal Silence League, C. Alexander Publishing Co., Los Angeles, California. (c. 1919). Reprinted by Missionary Independent Spiritual Church, 2012.
- Alexander's Book of Extensive Astrological Readings, C. Alexander Publishing Co., Los Angeles, California, 1919.
- Alexander's Book of Mystery, C. Alexander Publishing Co., Los Angeles, California, 1919.
- The Life And Mysteries Of The Celebrated Dr. Q, C. Alexander Publishing Co., Los Angeles, California, 1921 [also known as The Dr. Q. Book]. (Reprinted by Robert Nelson Enterprises, Columbus, Ohio, c. 1948).
- Alexander's Book of Mystery: Astrological Forecasts, Crystal Gazing, Practical and Advanced Psychology, Etc., C. Alexander Publishing Co. 1923.
- The Projective Branch of Crystal Gazing, Written Especially for and Dedicated to Members of The Crystal Silence League, C. Alexander Publishing Co., Los Angeles, California. n.d. (c. 1923).
- The Inner Secrets of Psychology Volumes 1 - 5, C. Alexander Publishing Co., Los Angeles, California,1924.
- Secrets of the Crystal Silence League: Crystal Ball Gazing, The Master Key to Silent Influence, Missionary Independent Spiritual Church, 2019. ISBN 978-0-9960523-5-1 (An edited posthumous collection consisting of Personal Lessons, Codes, and Instructions and Crystal Gazing: Lessons and Instructions in Silent Influence compiled into one volume.)
