= Tărtășești =

- Commune
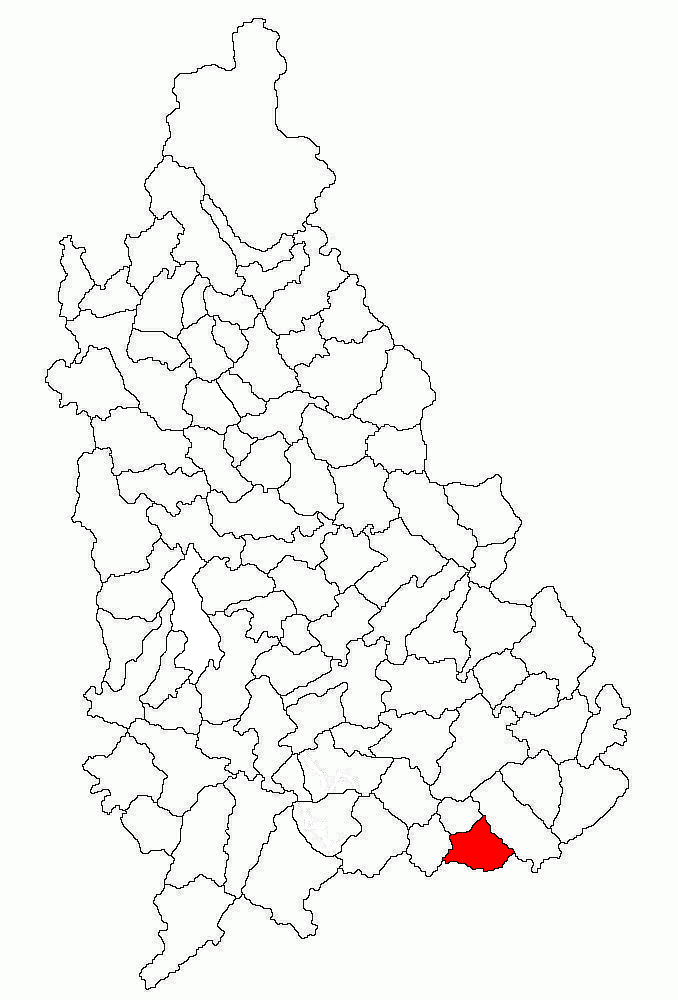
- Location in Dâmbovița County

- Location in Romania
- Coordinates: 44°35′N 25°49′E
- Country: Romania
- County: Dâmbovița

Government
  - Mayor (2024–2028): Cristian Tudorache (PSD)
- Area: 60.77 km^{2} (23.46 sq mi)
- Elevation: 117 m (384 ft)
- Population (2021-12-01): 6,158
  - Density: 100/km^{2} (260/sq mi)
- Time zone: EET/EEST (UTC+2/+3)
- Postal code: 137435
- Area code: +(40) 245
- Vehicle reg.: DB
- Website: www.primariatartasesti.ro

Tărtășești is a commune in the Dâmbovița County, Muntenia, Romania, located 30 km (19 mi) northwest of Bucharest. It has a population of 6,158 as of 2021. It is composed of three villages: Bâldana, Gulia, and Tărtășești.

The Bucharest–Târgoviște National Road passes through this locality. In the last years (mainly after 2000), Tărtășești knew a notable development, becoming one of the most important communes near Bucharest (mostly because of modernization of the roads, introducing the gas network and expanding the Bucharest metropolitan area, which brought the Romanian capital to a very short distance – 15 km). The most common activity the people is agriculture, but there are also a few industrial facilities – bread factory, food processing facility, storage facilities, etc.

Historical population
Year	Pop.	±%
2002	5,121	—
2011	5,874	+14.7%
2021	6,158	+4.8%
Source: Census data

== Natives ==
- Gregorian Bivolaru (born 1952), yoga teacher
