= As above, so below =

Popular Neo-Hermetic maxim

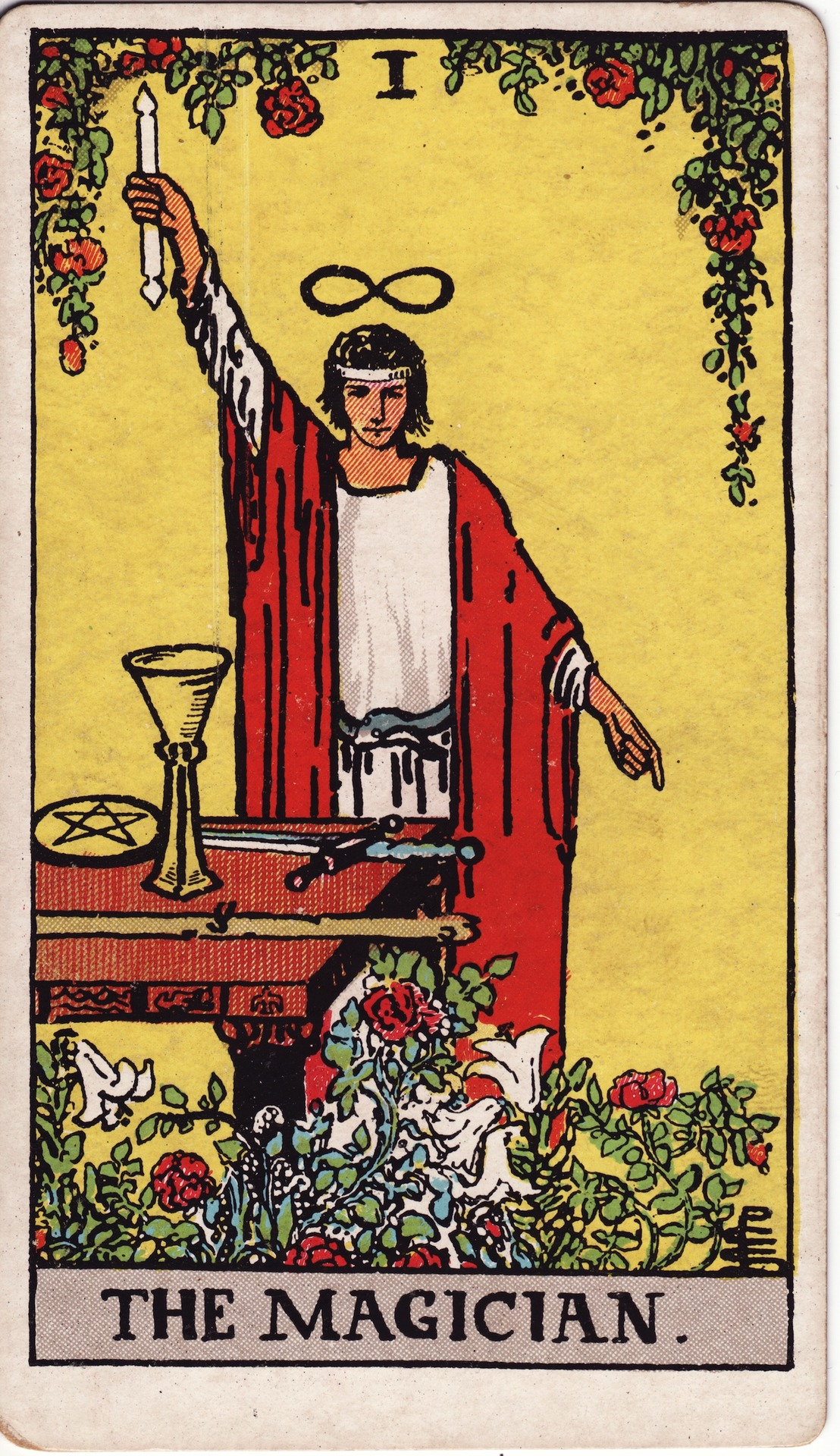
The Magician, from the 1909 Rider–Waite tarot deck, often thought to represent the concept of "as above, so below".

"As above, so below" is a popular modern paraphrase of the second verse of the Emerald Tablet, a short Hermetic text which first appeared in an Arabic source from the late eighth or early ninth century. The paraphrase is based on one of several existing Latin translations of the Emerald Tablet, in which the second verse appears as follows:

Quod est superius est sicut quod inferius, et quod inferius est sicut quod est superius.

That which is above is like to that which is below, and that which is below is like to that which is above.

The paraphrase is peculiar to this Latin version, and differs from the original Arabic, which reads "from" rather than "like to".

Following its use by prominent modern occultists such as Helena P. Blavatsky (1831–1891, co-founder of the Theosophical Society) and the anonymous author of the Kybalion (often taken to be William W. Atkinson, 1862–1932, a pioneer of the New Thought movement), the paraphrase started to take on a life of its own, becoming an often cited motto in New Age circles.

== Scholarly interpretations ==
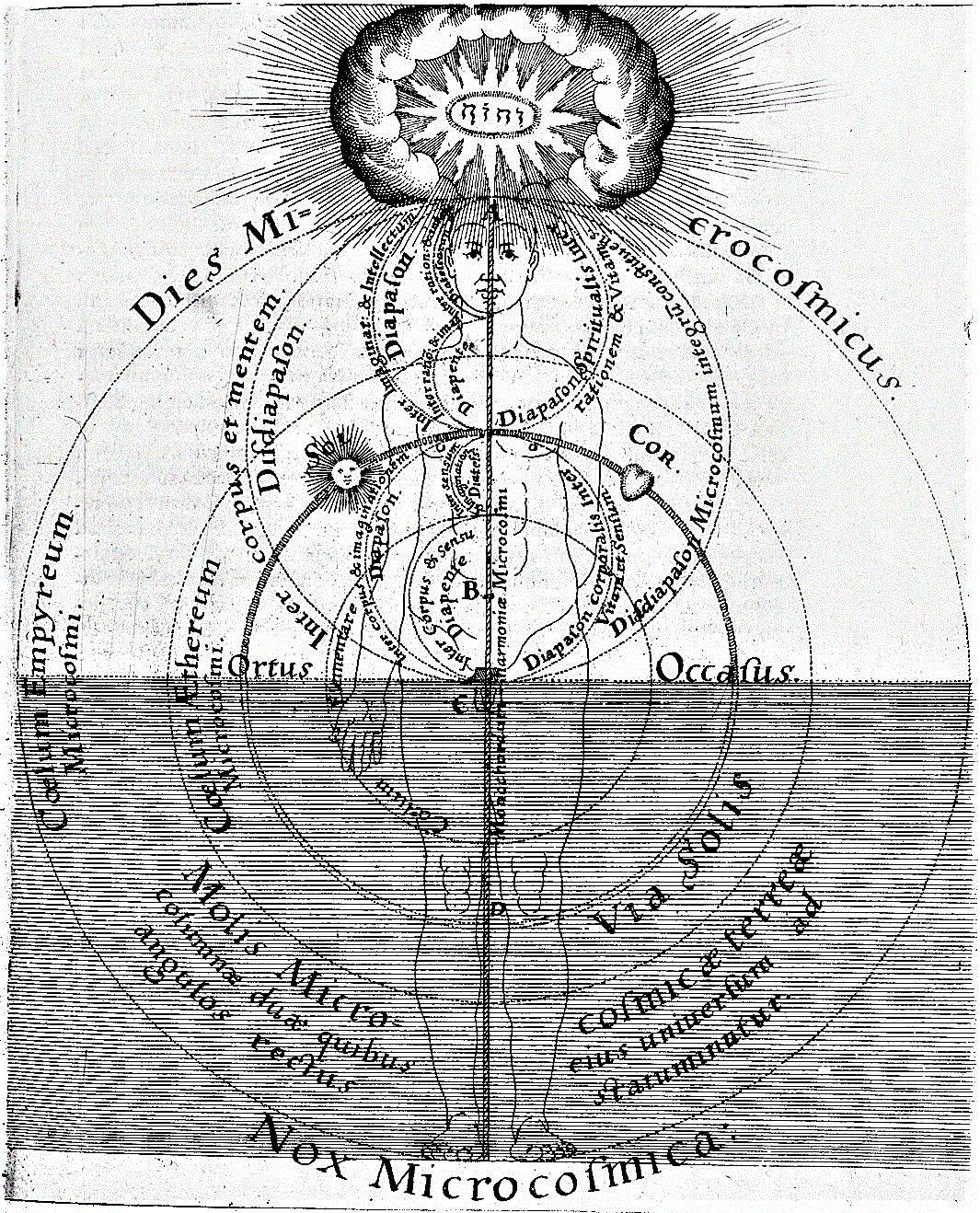
Man as a microcosm; illustrated in Robert Fludd's Utrisque Cosmi, 1619.

Among historians of philosophy and science, the verse is often understood as a reference to the supposed effects of heavenly bodies upon terrestrial events. This would include the effects of the Sun upon the change of seasons, or those of the Moon upon the tides, but also more elaborate astrological effects.

According to another common interpretation, the verse refers to the structural similarities (or 'correspondences') between the macrocosm (from Greek makros kosmos, "the great world"; the universe as a whole, understood as a great living being) and the microcosm (from Greek mikros kosmos, "the small world"; the human being, understood as a miniature universe). This type of view is found in many philosophical systems world-wide, the most relevant here being ancient Greek and Hellenistic philosophy, where notable proponents included Anaximander (c. 610 – c. 546 BCE), Plato (c. 428 or 424 – c. 348 BCE), the Hippocratic authors (late fifth or early fourth century BCE and onwards), and the Stoics (third century BCE and onwards).

== Occultist interpretations ==
=== Helena P. Blavatsky's Isis Unveiled (1877) ===
The occultists who were responsible for the popularization of the paraphrase generally understood it in the context of Emanuel Swedenborg's (1688–1772) doctrine of the correspondence between different planes of existence, a strongly elaborated version of the classical macrocosm–microcosm analogy. This interpretation was pioneered by Helena P. Blavatsky (1831–1891), whose works contain some of the earliest occurrences of the phrase as an independent axiom. Generally writing from a perennialist perspective, Blavatsky associated the phrase with a number of historically unrelated thought systems such as Pythagoreanism, Kabbalah and Buddhism.

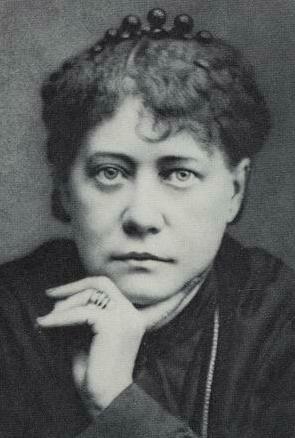
Helena P. Blavatsky (1831–1891)

From Blavatsky's Isis Unveiled (1877):

His [sc. Swedenborg's] doctrine of correspondence, or Hermetic symbolism, is that of Pythagoras and of the kabalists—"as above, so below." It is also that of the Buddhist philosophers, who, in their still more abstract metaphysics, inverting the usual mode of definition given by our erudite scholars, call the invisible types the only reality, and everything else the effects of the causes, or visible prototypes—illusions.

There is no prominent character in all the annals of sacred or profane history whose prototype we cannot find in the half-fictitious and half-real traditions of bygone religions and mythologies. As the star, glimmering at an immeasurable distance above our heads, in the boundless immensity of the sky, reflects itself in the smooth waters of a lake, so does the imagery of men of the antediluvian ages reflect itself in the periods we can embrace in an historical retrospect. "As above, so it is below. That which has been, will return again. As in heaven, so on earth."

The spirit of a mineral, plant, or animal, may begin to form here, and reach its final development millions of ages hereafter, on other planets, known or unknown, visible or invisible to astronomers. For, who is able to controvert the theory previously suggested, that the earth itself will, like the living creatures to which it has given birth, ultimately, and after passing through its own stage of death and dissolution, become an etherealized astral planet ? "As above, so below;" harmony is the great law of nature.

=== The Kybalion (1908) ===
Though retaining the interpretation of the phrase in terms of Swedenborg's doctrine of correspondence, it was somewhat more closely associated with the philosophical mentalism (the primacy of mind as the active cause of things) of the ancient Greek Hermetica by the anonymous author of the Kybalion (1908, 'Three Initiates', perhaps William W. Atkinson, 1862–1932). What follows are some literal quotes from the book:

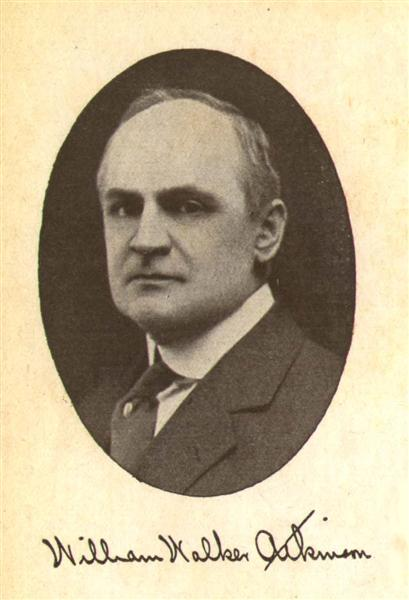
William W. Atkinson (1862–1932), often thought to be the author of the Kybalion.

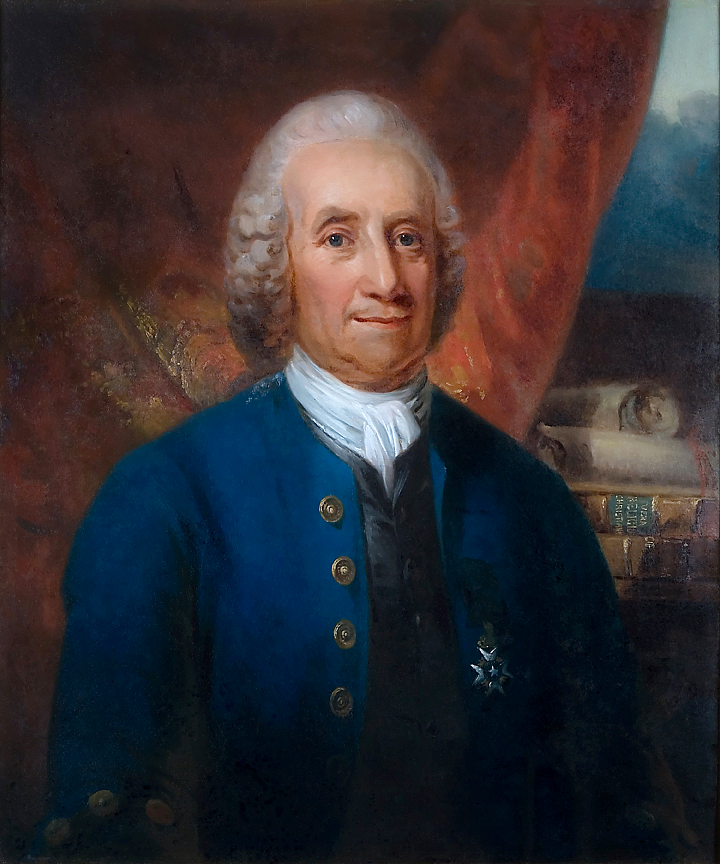
Emanuel Swedenborg (1688–1772), major advocate of the doctrine of correspondence.

II. The Principle of Correspondence.

"As above, so below; as below, so above"– The Kybalion.

This Principle embodies the truth that there is always a Correspondence between the laws and phenomena of the various planes of Being and Life. The old Hermetic axiom ran in these words: "As above, so below; as below, so above." [...] This Principle is of universal application and manifestation, on the various planes of the material, mental, and spiritual universe– it is an Universal Law. [...] Just as a knowledge of the Principles of Geometry enables man to measure distant suns and their movements, while seated in his observatory, so a knowledge of the Principle of Correspondence enables Man to reason intelligently from the Known to the Unknown. [...]

The Planes of Correspondence.

"As above, so below; as below, so above."—The Kybalion.

The great Second Hermetic Principle embodies the truth that there is a harmony, agreement, and correspondence between the several planes of Manifestation, Life and Being. This truth is a truth because all that is included in the Universe emanates from the same source, and the same laws, principles, and characteristics apply to each unit, or combination of units of activity, as each manifests its own phenomena upon its own plane. [...]

[...] The old Hermetic axiom, "As above so below," may be pressed into service at this point. Let us endeavor to get a glimpse of the workings on higher planes by examining those on our own. The Principle of Correspondence must apply to this as well as to other problems. Let us see! On his own plane of being, how does Man create? Well, first, he may create by making something out of outside materials. But this will not do, for there are no materials outside of THE ALL with which it may create. Well, then, secondly, Man pro-creates or reproduces his kind by the process of begetting, which is self-multiplication accomplished by transferring a portion of his substance to his offspring. But this will not do, because THE ALL cannot transfer or subtract a portion of itself, nor can it reproduce or multiply itself— in the first place there would be a taking away, and in the second case a multiplication or addition to THE ALL, both thoughts being an absurdity. Is there no third way in which MAN creates? Yes, there is—he CREATES MENTALLY! And in so doing he uses no outside materials, nor does he reproduce himself, and yet his Spirit pervades the Mental Creation. Following the Principle of Correspondence, we are justified in considering that THE ALL creates the Universe MENTALLY, in a manner akin to the process whereby Man creates Mental Images. [...]

[...] The student will, of course, realize that the illustrations given above are necessarily imperfect and inadequate, for they represent the creation of mental images in finite minds, while the Universe is a creation of Infinite Mind—and the difference between the two poles separates them. And yet it is merely a matter of degree—the same Principle is in operation—the Principle of Correspondence manifests in each—"As above, so Below; as Below, so above." And, in the degree that Man realizes the existence of the Indwelling Spirit immanent within his being, so will he rise in the spiritual scale of life. This is what spiritual development means—the recognition, realization, and manifestation of the Spirit within us. Try to remember this last definition—that of spiritual development. It contains the Truth of True Religion.

== Difference from the original Arabic ==
The original Arabic of the verse in the Emerald Tablet itself does not mention that what is above and what is below are "as" or "like" each other, but rather that they are "from" each other:

Arabic: إن الأعلى من الأسفل والأسفل من الأعلى (Inna al-aʿlā min al-asfal wa-l-asfal min al-aʿlā)

Latin translation by Hugo of Santalla: Superiora de inferioribus, inferiora de superioribus

English translation of the Arabic: That which is above is from that which is below, and that which is below is from that which is above.

== In popular culture ==
The phrase has also been adopted as a title for various works of art, such as the 2014 found-footage horror film As Above, So Below, as well as a number of musical works listed at As above, so below (disambiguation).

== Bibliography ==
- Allers, Rudolf (1944). "Microcosmus: From Anaximandros to Paracelsus". Traditio. 2: 319–407. doi:10.1017/S0362152900017219. JSTOR 27830052. S2CID 149312818.
- Barkan, Leonard (1975). Nature's Work of Art: The Human Body as Image of the World. London/New Haven: Yale University Press. ISBN 9780300016949.
- Blavatsky, Helena P. (1877). Isis Unveiled: A Master-Key to the Mysteries of Ancient and Modern Science and Theology. Vol. 1–2. New York: J. W. Bouton.
- Chapel, Nicholas E. (2013). "The Kybalion's New Clothes: An Early 20th Century Text's Dubious Association with Hermeticism". Journal of the Western Mystery Tradition. 3 (24).
- Conger, George Perrigo (1922). Theories of Macrocosms and Microcosms in the History of Philosophy. New York: Columbia University Press. ISBN 9781290429832.
- Deslippe, Philip (2011). The Kybalion: The Definitive Edition. New York: Tarcher/Penguin. ISBN 978-1585428748.
- Duchesne-Guillemin, Jacques (1956). "Persische weisheit in griechischem gewande?". Harvard Theological Review. 49 (2): 115–122. doi:10.1017/S0017816000028169. JSTOR 1508803. S2CID 164108095.
- Götze, Albrecht (1923). "Persische Weisheit in griechischem Gewande: Ein Beitrag zur Geschichte der Mikrokosmos-Idee". Zeitschrift für Indologie und Iranistik. 2: 60–98, 167–177.
- Hahm, David E. (1977). The Origins of Stoic Cosmology. Columbus: Ohio State University Press. ISBN 978-0814202531.
- Holmyard, Eric J. (1923). "The Emerald Table". Nature. 122 (2814): 525–526. Bibcode:1923Natur.112..525H. doi:10.1038/112525a0.
- Horowitz, Mitch (2019). "The New Age and Gnosticism: Terms of Commonality". Gnosis: Journal of Gnostic Studies. 4 (2): 191–215. doi:10.1163/2451859X-12340073. S2CID 214533789.
- Hudry, Françoise (1997–1999). "Le De secretis nature du Ps. Apollonius de Tyane, traduction latine par Hugues de Santalla du Kitæb sirr al-halîqa". Chrysopoeia. 6: 1–154.
- Kranz, Walther (1938). "Kosmos und Mensch in der Vorstellung frühen Griechentums". Nachrichten von der Gesellschaft der Wissenschaften zu Göttingen, Philologisch-historische Klasse. 2 (7): 121–161. OCLC 905422149.
- Kraus, Paul (1942–1943). Jâbir ibn Hayyân: Contribution à l'histoire des idées scientifiques dans l'Islam. I. Le corpus des écrits jâbiriens. II. Jâbir et la science grecque. Cairo: Institut Français d'Archéologie Orientale. ISBN 9783487091150. OCLC 468740510.
- Olerud, Anders (1951). L'idée de macrocosmos et de microcosmos dans le 'Timée' de Platon: Étude de mythologie comparée. Uppsala: Almqvist & Wiksell. OCLC 680524865.
- Principe, Lawrence M. (2013). The Secrets of Alchemy. Chicago: The University of Chicago Press. ISBN 978-0226103792.
- Prophet, Erin (2018). "Hermetic Influences on the Evolutionary System of Helena Blavatsky's Theosophy". Gnosis: Journal of Gnostic Studies. 3 (1): 84–111. doi:10.1163/2451859X-12340050.
- Smoley, Richard (2018). The Kybalion: Centenary Edition. New York: Tarcher/Penguin. ISBN 9780143131687.
- Steele, Robert; Singer, Dorothea Waley (1928). "The Emerald Table". Proceedings of the Royal Society of Medicine. 21 (3): 41–57/485–501. doi:10.1177/003591572802100361. PMC 2101974. PMID 19986273.
- Three Initiates (1908). The Kybalion: A Study of the Hermetic Philosophy of Ancient Egypt and Greece. Chicago: The Yogi Publication Society.
- Van Gijsen, Annelies (2006). "Astrology I: Introduction". In Hanegraaff, Wouter J. (ed.). Dictionary of Gnosis and Western Esotericism. Leiden: Brill. pp. 109–110. ISBN 9789004152311.
- Weisser, Ursula (1979). Buch über das Geheimnis der Schöpfung und die Darstellung der Natur (Buch der Ursachen) von Pseudo-Apollonios von Tyana. Aleppo: Institute for the History of Arabic Science. OCLC 13597803.
- Weisser, Ursula (1980). Spies, Otto (ed.). Das "Buch über das Geheimnis der Schöpfung" von Pseudo-Apollonios von Tyana. Berlin: De Gruyter. doi:10.1515/9783110866933. ISBN 978-3-11-086693-3.
- Zirnis, Peter (1979). The Kitāb Usṭuqus al-uss of Jābir ibn Ḥayyān (Unpublished PhD diss.). New York University.
