= Flaming Swords =

Studio album by Fievel Is Glauque
- Released: November 25, 2022
- Studio: La Savonnerie (Brussels)
- Genre: Experimental / Jazz
- Length: 36:53
- Label: Math Interactive

Fievel Is Glauque chronology
God's Trashmen Sent to Right the Mess (2021)	Flaming Swords (2022)	Rong Weicknes (2024)

Singles from Flaming Swords
- 1. "Save the Phenomenon" Released: October 5, 2022; 2. "Clues Not to Read" Released: November 9, 2022

Flaming Swords is the debut studio album by Belgian-American band Fievel Is Glauque. It was released on November 25, 2022, on Math Interactive. It was the band's first full-length studio release, following their 2021 compilation album God's Trashmen Sent to Right the Mess.

== Writing and recording ==
Fievel Is Glauque co-founders Zach Phillips and Ma Clément wrote the music of Flaming Swords over the course of several months while Phillips was living in Clément's native Brussels. Phillips explained, "Musically, Ma directed melodic impetus and I directed harmonic and rhythmic framing ... Lyrically, we fought and embraced our initial impulses alternatingly; above all, we tried to trust and document the psychodynamics of the process itself rather than attempting to express concrete, prefab emotional or intellectual messaging.

Joined by session musicians Anatole Damien, Raphaël Desmarets, Johannes Eimermacher, Gaspard Sicx, and Eric Kinny, the latter a pedal steel guitarist who first introduced Phillips to Clément, the group recorded the entirety of the album's 18 tracks live to tape in one day at La Savonnerie in Brussels. Regarding the album's recording session, Phillips remarked, "That was a really long day ... I got there at, like, nine in the morning and we didn't leave until 1AM."

== Release ==
Fievel Is Glauque announced the album alongside the release of its lead single, "Save the Phenomenon", on October 5, 2022, while the band was on tour opening for Stereolab. On November 9, 2022, the band released the album's second single, "Clues Not to Read", which serves as the album's closer and is its longest track by nearly two minutes.

== Critical reception ==
Professional ratings
Review scores
Source	Rating
Paste	8.4/10
Pitchfork	8.1/10

Flaming Swords was met with critical acclaim. In an 8.1/10 review for Pitchfork, Travis Shosa wrote, "Cramming highly technical and conversational fusion compositions within sub-two-minute songs, the album has the allure of a puzzle box with no right or wrong answers: just barrages of instrumental hooks and Delphic ponderings of the human condition." Bill Pearis of BrooklynVegan called the album "a stylish mix of Tropicália, jazz, '70s laid-back grooves, skronky prog, movie samples and just a little punk, almost entirely played as tight little vignettes."

Jason Friedman of Paste wrote, "Flaming Swords' jazzy, pop complexity feels curious, whimsical, and exploratory," noting that "the album is hard to compare to any other musical movements happening right now, seemingly defying convention at every possible turn." In a review for Bandcamp Daily, Miles Bowe complimented "the compositional partnership between Phillips and Clément, whose strength for creating impossibly complex arrangements and powerful, heart-stirring melodies complement each other wonderfully," also calling attention to "the album's few, well-placed skits—taken from old, dubbed films in a move that surprisingly recalls Wu-Tang Clan."

== Track listing ==
All tracks are written by Zach Phillips and Ma Clément, except where otherwise noted.

No.	Title	Writer(s)	Length
1.	"Flaming Swords"		2:25
2.	"Save the Phenomenon"		1:46
3.	"Nos Embranchements"		2:31
4.	"Days of Pleasure"		2:15
5.	"My Rebel"		1:48
6.	"Little Bad Miracle"		1:07
7.	"I'm a Place"	Phillips	2:07
8.	"Less to Be"		1:47
9.	"Porn of Love"		1:56
10.	"Boîte à Serpents"		1:52
11.	"Paging Agent Starling"	Quentin Moore	1:37
12.	"4000 Rooms"		2:01
13.	"Constantly Rare"		1:57
14.	"Wrong Item"		1:55
15.	"One Hope"		2:11
16.	"The Trick"		1:32
17.	"To Be Gone"	Phillips	1:29
18.	"Clues Not to Read"		4:27
Total length:			36:53

== Personnel ==
Adapted from Bandcamp.

- Ma Clément – vocals
- Zach Phillips – Rhodes, piano
- Anatole Damien – guitar, bass (2, 8, 16, 18)
- Raphaël Desmarets – bass, guitar (2, 8, 16, 18)
- Johannes Eimermacher – alto saxophone
- Eric Kinny – pedal steel guitar
- Gaspard Sicx – drums
