= Agama Yoga =

Yoga school founded by Swami Vivekananda Saraswati

Agama Yoga is a yoga school founded by Swami Vivekananda Saraswati, a Romanian yoga instructor born as Narcis Tarcău. The school is located on the island of Koh Pha Ngan in Thailand. In 2018, Agama also had centers in India, Colombia and Austria.

Narcis Tarcău was, since 1981, part of MISA, a Romanian yoga school founded by Gregorian Bivolaru and he founded NATHA, the MISA branch in Denmark. He was a student and instructor at the MISA Yoga School until 1998. He lived in India for 4 years, until 2002. Tarcău founded Agama after he left India.

In 2018, Narcis Tarcău was accused by at least 14 yoga students of sexual assault and rape.

In 2020, the case was presented in (Un)Well - a Netflix 6 episode docu-series, in the second episode, which covers the topic of tantric sex.

== See also ==
- Sexual abuse by yoga gurus
