= Fievel Is Glauque =

American-Belgian experimental jazz duo

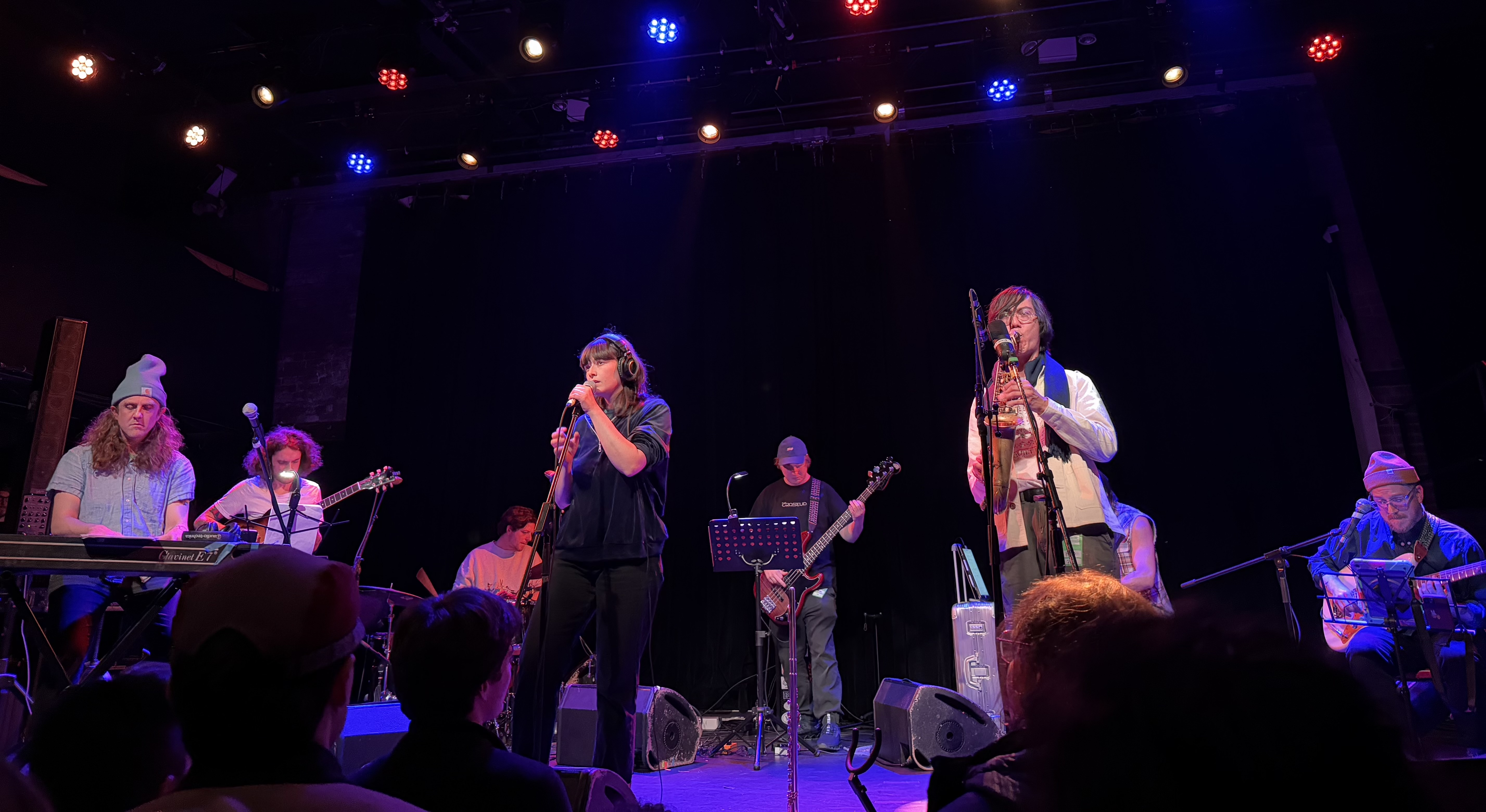
- Fievel Is Glauque in 2025

Background information
- Origin: Brussels, Belgium
- Genres: Lo-fi; Jazz; Avant-pop
- Years active: 2018-present
- Labels: Fat Possum, Math Interactive
- Members: Ma Clément, Zach Phillips
- Website: fievelisglauque.com

Fievel Is Glauque is a musical jazz-pop duo composed of pianist Zach Phillips and singer Ma Clément, who initially met in 2018 in Brussels. The two are based in New York City and Brussels respectively.

The duo has recorded three albums, on which they are accompanied variously by other musicians. Their debut was 2021's lo-fi God's Trashmen Sent to Right the Mess. Their following albums were recorded in studio: Flaming Swords in 2022, then Rong Weicknes in 2024. Rong Weicknes received critical acclaim for its complex arrangements combined with poppy melodies. The band has been noted for their use of improvisation and unconventional recording styles.

== History ==
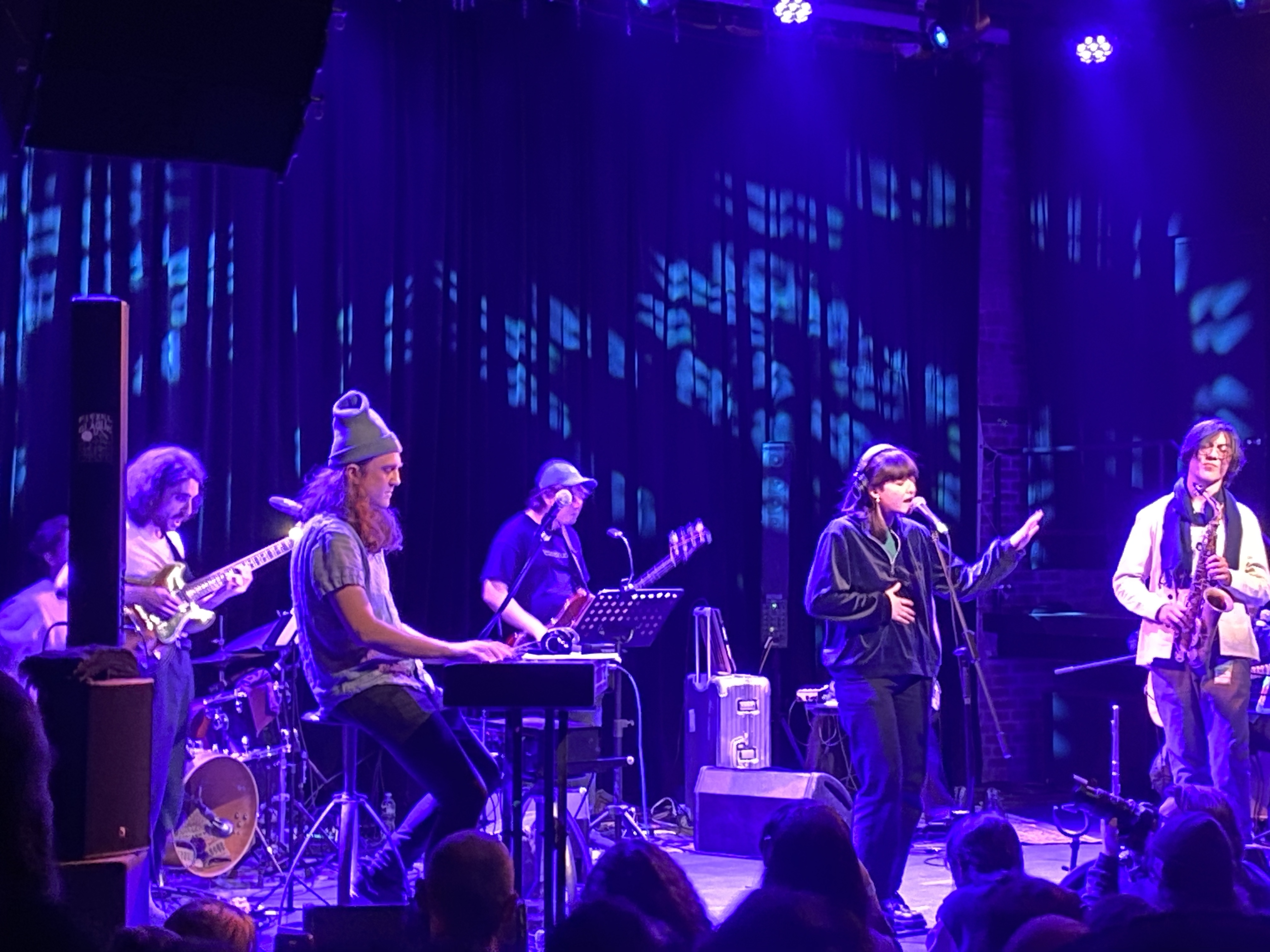
Fievel Is Glauque performing in Williamsburg, Brooklyn in 2025

Phillips and Clément formed the band after meeting by chance in Brussels in 2018 when Phillips injured himself on a metal pole; Clément was trained as a nurse and helped provide first aid. The name originates with the band's first saxophonist, Eléonore Kenis, after Fievel Mouskewitz (the protagonist of An American Tail) and the French word glauque, meaning blue-green (as in "glaucous"); or, metaphorically, run-down, sordid, or sleazy. Phillips stated that his "post-hoc rationalized interpretation" of the name was that it was meant to evoke the gentrification of sleazy glauque places.

The band released their first album, God's Trashmen Sent to Right the Mess, on January 1 2021. The album was recorded live on cassette tape in mono over a series of sessions, with a different assembly of musicians on each track.

Their next release, Aérodynes EP, was released March 26 2022 and was recorded on tape via overdub. In the fall of 2022, with a new set of session musicians, the lead single "Go Down Softly" was released, backed with "the River," which was written by Phillips and Sarah Smith as Blanche Blanche Blanche. In the fall of 2022, the band opened for Stereolab in North America. The band ended the tour with the release of their second album and debut studio album Flaming Swords on November 5 2022. Flaming Swords is recorded live in one session. They released the single "I'm Scanning Things I Can't See"/"Dark Dancing" in August 2023, accompanied by a short film directed by Joey Agresta.

On August 14, 2024, the band announced their next album, Rong Weicknes, with the release of its lead single, "As Above So Below". Its second promotional single "Love Weapon" (originally written in 2011 with Blanche Blanche Blanche) was released on September 18, 2024. Rong Weicknes, the band's third album and second studio album, was released on October 25, 2024, with Fat Possum Records. The album was recorded by an octet over the course of a week "live in triplicate", a process in which the band layered two straightforward takes of the album atop a third, more improvisatory take. The three takes were then subtractively edited together by their mixing and mastering engineer. The album received positive reviews from Pitchfork, which called the album "their prettiest, poppiest rush-hour prog-jazz clusterfuck yet;" The Quietus, which described the album as "upbeat, energetic" yet "meticulously arranged and begging to be examined;" and Tape Op, which praised its "inviting and off-kilter tunes." The Guardian gave the album four stars out of five, noting its "poetic lyrics" and "foundations, built with brilliant melody and musicianship." Paste also gave a positive review, noting Clément's vocal quality, calling it the "grounding force" to the album's "fantastical" instrumentation and melodies.

== Style ==
Fievel Is Glauque's music has been described by NPR as "jazzy, psychedelic pop," by Pitchfork as experimental jazz, and by Still Listening as avant-pop. Miles Bowe of Bandcamp described them as an "intricate [fusion] of jazz, pop, and chanteuse music." For God's Trashmen, Phillips attributed the French pop influence to the mostly-francophone members of the band. Their second album, Flaming Swords, represented an evolution in the lo-fi sound of God's Trashmen, with more complex and rich arrangements as well as skits extracted from movies in the style of the Wu-Tang Clan.

Their third album Rong Weicknes was recorded using the "live in triplicate" recording method. This involved making three recordings, including one faithful overdub and one heavily improvised take, and then layering them together. This method was inspired by The Clash's method of recording a full band overdub for their song "The Card Cheat." This created an eclectic style which Pitchfork compared to the band Black Midi, and The Guardian to Black Country, New Road, Julia Holter, Stereolab, and Rotary Connection.

=== Influences ===
Clément listed Blue Bell Knoll by the Cocteau Twins as a particular favorite, and Whitney Houston and Björk as vocalists she admired. Zach Phillips cited Maher Shalal Hash Baz, Royal Trux, Annette Peacock, MF Doom, and Daniel Johnston as inspirations through both their "music and ethoses". He also stated that he admired as pianists Mal Waldron and Carla Bley. Other influences include Quentin Moore, Kurt Weisman, Ruth Garbus, and Ryan Power, as well as a variety of visual artists, writers, and philosophers including Christopher Forgues and Jacques Lacan and the filmmaker Hal Hartley.

== Members ==
=== Core members ===
- Ma Clément – vocals
- Zach Phillips – keyboards

=== Auxiliary members and collaborators ===
- Derek Baron – drums (Note: Appears on God's Trashmen Sent to Right the Mess (2021).)
- Chris Cohen – drums
- Stephe Cooper – bass guitar
- Anatole Damien – guitar, bass guitar (Note: Appears on Flaming Swords (2022).)
- Raphaël Desmarets – bass guitar, guitar, backing vocals
- Olia Eichenbaum – backing vocals
- Johannes Eimermacher – alto saxophone
- Thom Gill – guitar (Note: Appears on Rong Weicknes (2024).)
- Davin Givhan – bass guitar
- Sylvain Haenen – guitar
- Faustine Hollander – bass guitar
- Logan Hone – alto saxophone, flute, guitar
- Shoko Igarashi – soprano saxophone, flute
- Jay Israelson – Juno synthesizer
- Logan Kane – bass guitar, upright bass
- Eléonore Kenis – alto saxophone
- Eric Kinny – lap steel, pedal steel
- Billy McShane – alto saxophone
- Roxane Métayer – violin
- Quentin Moore – guitar
- Valentin Noiret – guitar
- Fabien Portejoie – bass guitar
- Ryan Power – guitar
- Pedro Riofrío – percussion
- Daniel Rossi – percussion
- Jean-Philippe Rouquier – drums
- André Sacalxot – alto saxophone, flute
- Hendrike Scharmann – violin
- Gaspard Sicx – drums
- Marta Tiesenga – tenor saxophone
- Chris Weisman – guitar, electric sitar, piano

== Discography ==
=== Albums ===
- God's Trashmen Sent to Right the Mess (2021)
- Flaming Swords (Math Interactive, 2022)
- Rong Weicknes (Fat Possum, 2024)

=== EPs ===
- Aérodynes (2022)

=== Singles ===
- Go Down Softly / the River
- Clues Not to Read
- Save the Phenomenon
- I'm Scanning Things I Can't See / Dark Dancing
- As Above So Below
- Love Weapon
