= Rong Weicknes =

Studio album by Fievel Is Glauque
- Released: October 25, 2024
- Recorded: August 2023
- Studio: Outlier Inn (Woodridge, New York)
- Genre: Jazz pop
- Length: 45:47
- Label: Fat Possum
- Producer: Zach Phillips; Steve Vealey

Fievel Is Glauque chronology
Flaming Swords (2022)	Rong Weicknes (2024)

Singles from Rong Weicknes
- 1. "As Above So Below" Released: August 14, 2024; 2. "Love Weapon" Released: September 18, 2023

Rong Weicknes (pronounced "wrong weakness") is the third album and second studio album by Belgian-American band Fievel Is Glauque. It was released on October 25, 2024, on Fat Possum Records.

== Background and recording ==
Fievel Is Glauque announced Rong Weicknes on August 14, 2024, alongside the release of the lead single "As Above So Below". Its second promotional single "Love Weapon" (originally written in 2011 with Blanche Blanche Blanche) was released on September 18, 2024. Recorded at the Outlier Inn in Upstate New York's Catskill Mountains, the album features six instrumentalists in addition to the band's core duo of vocalist Ma Clément and keyboardist Zach Phillips.

The album continued the band's tendency for unusual recording processes, following their 2021 album God's Trashmen Sent to Right the Mess, which was recorded in mono on a cassette tape, and their 2022 debut studio album, Flaming Swords, which was recorded in its entirety in one night. Rong Weicknes was recorded over the course of a week "live in triplicate", a process in which the band layered two straightforward takes of the album atop a third, more improvisatory take. The three takes were then subtractively edited together by mixing and mastering engineer Steve Vealey.

The sixth song, "Toute Suite", was one of the earliest songs played by the band in 2018. Clément brought up the song during the band's last studio day and a quick version of the song was recorded for the album.

The title of the album is a reference to Paul the Apostle: "about how weakness can be a form of strength." The title of the lead single "As Above So Below" derives from the film Dogma.

Two songs from the album, "Dark Dancing" and "I'm Scanning Things I Can't See", were released as a double single on August 15, 2023, but were later re-recorded in triplicate for the album.

== Critical reception ==
Professional ratings
Aggregate scores
Source	Rating
Metacritic	77/100
Review scores
Source	Rating
AllMusic	2.5/5 stars
The Guardian	4/5 stars
Mojo	4/5 stars
Paste	8.2/10
Pitchfork	8.0/10
Uncut	8/10

Rong Weicknes received largely positive reviews from music critics upon its release. At Metacritic, the album received an aggregate score of 77 based on 7 reviews, indicating "generally favorable reviews".

In a review for Pitchfork, Kieran Press-Reynolds called the album Fievel Is Glauque's "most giddily hyperkinetic, vividly colored, unabashedly maximalist record yet", describing its sound as a "jazzy version of middle-of-the-road '70s pop like the Carpenters, with a flurry of time signature and tempo shifts and extreme rhythmic flexibility". Writing for The Guardian, reviewer Ben Beaumont-Thomas described the album as a series of "teetering song-towers that never quite topple", summarizing that "brilliant melodies, poetic lyrics and quick-change time signatures elevate this quirky jazz pop release to a level all its own." In a positive review for The Quietus, Amanda Farah pointed to the unique experimental nature of the album's recording process, writing: "[Fievel Is Glauque's] third album is, at face value, upbeat, energetic, and channels the AM radio gold of '60s and '70s easy listening pop classics. For close listeners, it’s a million mosaicked pieces meticulously arranged and begging to be examined."

In a more mixed review for AllMusic, who assigned Rong Weicknes an Album Pick, Marcy Donelson wrote that "the songwriting is relatively variable, touching on familiar influences like French pop ('Haut Contre Bas'), jazzy vocal pop (the title track), Brazilian jazz ('I'm Scanning Things I Can't See'), and more", describing the album as "sweetly melodic and more structured at times (grooving second track 'As Above So Below') but is consistently uncanny and sometimes borders on harrowing", and concluding that the album's "triplicate" recording process ultimately makes it sound "muddled in many of its would-be fleeting spaces".

== Track listing ==
All tracks are written by Zach Phillips and Ma Clément, except where otherwise noted.

No.	Title	Writer(s)	Length
1.	"Hover"		3:59
2.	"As Above So Below"		3:46
3.	"Would You Rather?"		0:41
4.	"Love Weapon"	Phillips; Sarah Smith	4:55
5.	"Rong Weicknes"		3:16
6.	"Toute Suite"	Phillips	3:23
7.	"It's So Easy"		2:09
8.	"I'm Scanning Things I Can't See"		2:39
9.	"Kayfabe"		4:54
10.	"My Oubliette"		2:11
11.	"Dark Dancing"		2:04
12.	"Great Blues"		2:39
13.	"Transparent"		3:13
14.	"Eternal Irises"		2:12
15.	"Haut Contre Bas"		3:39
Total length:			45:47

== Personnel ==
Adapted from Bandcamp.

- Ma Clément – vocals
- Zach Phillips – piano, clavinet, Voyetra-8, ARP String Ensemble
- Thom Gill – electric guitar
- Chris Weisman – rubber-bridge guitar, electric guitar, electric sitar, piano (track 9)
- Logan Kane – electric bass, upright bass
- André Sacalxot – alto saxophone, flute
- Gaspard Sicx – drums
- Daniel Rossi – percussion
