= L. W. de Laurence =

American occult and spiritual author and publisher

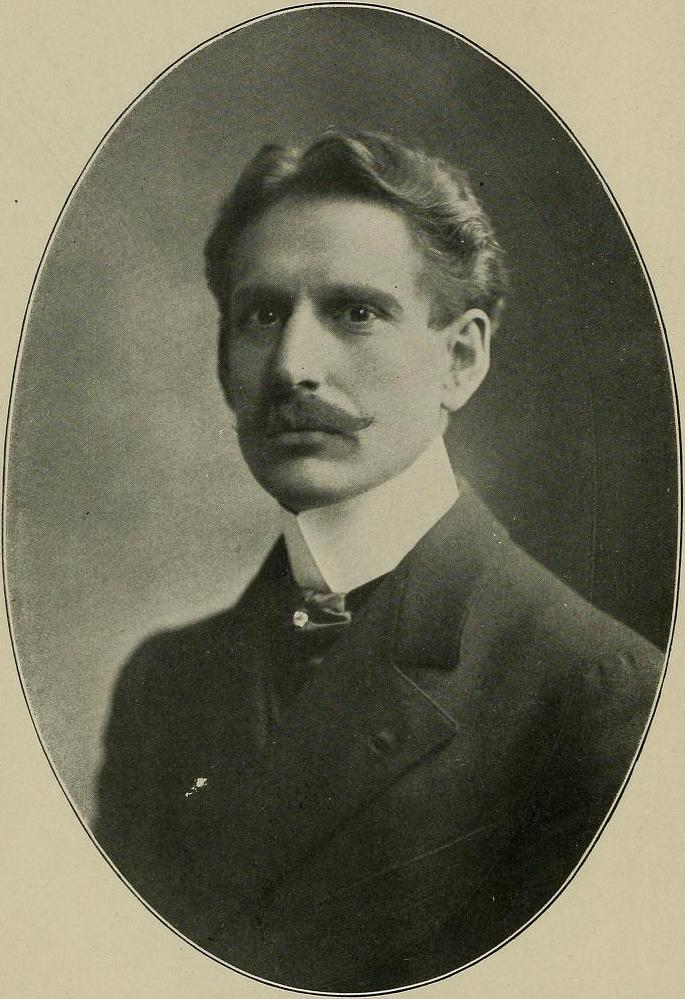
- Self styled spiritual authority
- Born: October 31, 1868; Cleveland, Ohio
- Died: September 11, 1936; Chicago, Illinois
- Occupations: Occultist; Publisher; Hypnotist
- Writing career
- Period: 1900 to 1930
- Subject: Occult
- Movement: New Thought

Lauron William de Laurence (31 October 1868 – 11 September 1936) was an American occult author and publisher, hypnotist, and spiritual leader. He founded multiple organizations promoting esoteric beliefs, notably including the Order of the Black Rose cult. His publications, including his edition of the Sixth and Seventh Books of Moses, influenced the practice of magic among the African diaspora in the Americas and the Caribbean.

== Early life ==
De Laurence was born on October 31st, 1868 in Cleveland, Ohio. He began his career as a magnetic healer and hypnotist, traveling throughout Canada and the American Midwest. He published his first book in 1900, when he moved to Chicago.

== Career ==
=== De Laurence, Scott & Co. ===
His publishing company (De Laurence, Scott & Co.) and spiritual supply mail order house was located in Chicago, Illinois. De Laurence was a pioneer in the business of supplying magical and occult goods by mail order, and his distribution of public domain books, such as Secrets of the Psalms by Godfrey Selig and Pow Wows or the Long-Lost Friend by John George Hohman had a great and lasting effect on the African American urban hoodoo community in the southern United States, as well as on the development of Obeah in Jamaica. As of 2026, all publications of De Laurence, Scott & Co. relating to supernatural arts are prohibited from entering Jamaica.

De Laurence, Scott & Co had a reputation for pirating the books of other occultists. De Laurence also wrote his own works, including The Master Key, a personal development book. In addition, he is believed to have co-written some books with his fellow Chicago resident, the prolific New Thought and yoga author William Walker Atkinson.

== Consecration ==
In early 1930 he was consecrated a bishop by the spiritualist Arthur Edward Leighton (1890–1963), a bishop of the American Catholic Church. His consecration influenced the move of some black spiritualist churches towards a more traditional view of Christianity. In the year of his death, 1936, he may have consecrated the first bishops for these churches, among them Thomas B. Watson (1898–1985) of New Orleans.

== Death ==
De Laurence died on September 11th 1936, leaving De Laurence, Scott and Co. to his son Velo de Laurence, which is still in operation today under the name of "The DeLaurence Company".
