= The Kybalion =

Modern Hermetic tract

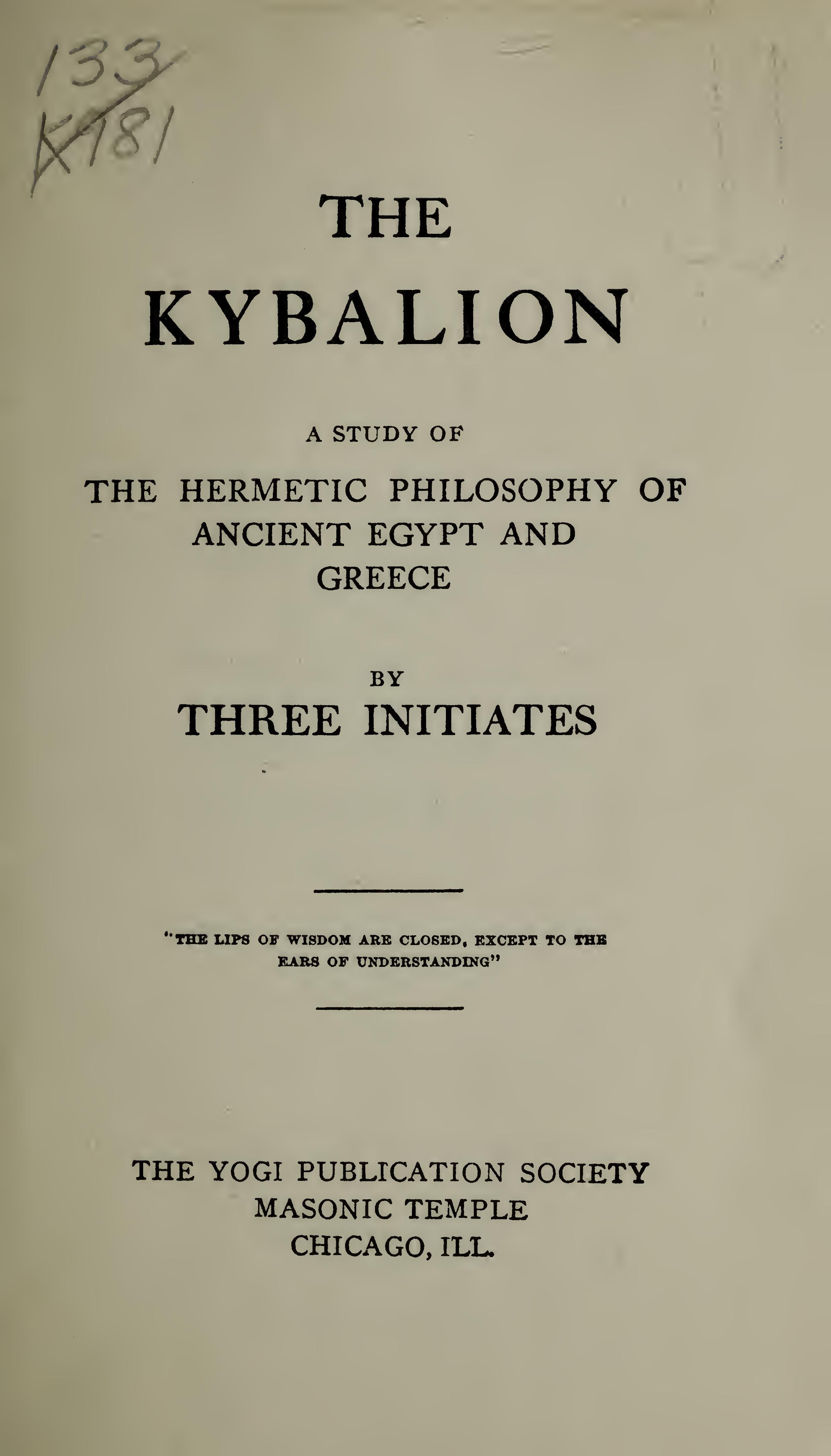
- Author: William Walker Atkinson (likely)
- Language: English
- Subject: Hermeticism, occultism
- Publisher: Yogi Publication Society
- Publication date: 1908
- Publication place: United States
- Text: The Kybalion at Wikisource

The Kybalion (full title: The Kybalion: A Study of the Hermetic Philosophy of Ancient Egypt and Greece) is a book originally published in 1908 by "Three Initiates" (often identified as the New Thought pioneer William Walker Atkinson, 1862–1932) that purports to convey the teachings of Hermes Trismegistus.

While it shares with ancient and medieval Hermetic texts a number of traits such as philosophical mentalism, the concept of 'as above, so below', and the idea that everything consists of gendered polar opposites, as a whole it is more indebted to the ideas of modern occultist authors, especially those of the New Thought movement to which Atkinson belonged. A modern Hermetic tract, it has been widely influential in New Age circles since the twentieth century.

== Title ==
The title Kybalion looks like an ancient Greek word, but it has no known meaning in that language. It was likely made up in an attempt to convey a false sense of antiquity. The term may have been coined in reference to Kabbalah, or perhaps to the Greco-Roman goddess Cybele (Gk. Kubelē), although neither of these two are mentioned within the book itself.

== Seven Hermetic principles ==
A central concept in the book is that there are "seven Hermetic principles, upon which the entire Hermetic philosophy is based". These are, as literally quoted from the book:

1. The principle of mentalism

"The All is Mind; the Universe is Mental."

2. The principle of correspondence

"As above, so below; as below, so above.” [...] This principle embodies the truth that there is always a correspondence between the laws and phenomena of the various planes of being and life.

3. The principle of vibration

"Nothing rests; everything moves; everything vibrates."

4. The principle of polarity

"Everything is dual; everything has poles; everything has its pair of opposites; like and unlike are the same; opposites are identical in nature, but different in degree; extremes meet; all truths are but half-truths; all paradoxes may be reconciled."

5. The principle of rhythm

"Everything flows, out and in; everything has its tides; all things rise and fall; the pendulum-swing manifests in everything; the measure of the swing to the right is the measure of the swing to the left; rhythm compensates."

6. The principle of cause and effect

"Every cause has its effect; every effect has its cause; everything happens according to law; chance is but a name for law not recognized; there are many planes of causation, but nothing escapes the law."

7. The principle of gender

"Gender is in everything; everything has its masculine and feminine principles; gender manifests on all planes."

== Relation to ancient and medieval Hermetica ==
According to occult writer Mitch Horowitz, the philosophical mentalism (the primacy of mind as the active cause of things) described by the Kybalion's first principle was inspired by broadly similar notions in the ancient Greek Hermetica.

Nicholas E. Chapel notes that while several aspects such as the philosophical mentalism, the concept of "as above, so below" as derived from the Emerald Tablet, and the idea that everything exists as pairs of gendered polar opposites, do have a background in ancient and medieval Hermetic texts, other aspects such as the principle of vibration (which originates in the philosophy of David Hartley, 1705–1757) are not related to Hermeticism.

Chapel also points out that there are a number of stark contrasts between the Kybalion and the traditional Hermetica, such as the Kybalion's anti-theological stance versus the heavy emphasis on theology in the Hermetica, or the Kybalion's focus on the practitioner's "mental transmutation" versus the traditional Hermetica's preoccupation with reverence for and unification with the divine. Chapel concludes that as a whole, the Kybalion is too bound up with early 20th-century ideas emanating from the New Thought movement to be representative of the broader historical tradition of Hermetic philosophy.
