= William Walker Atkinson =

American writer and occultist (1862–1932)

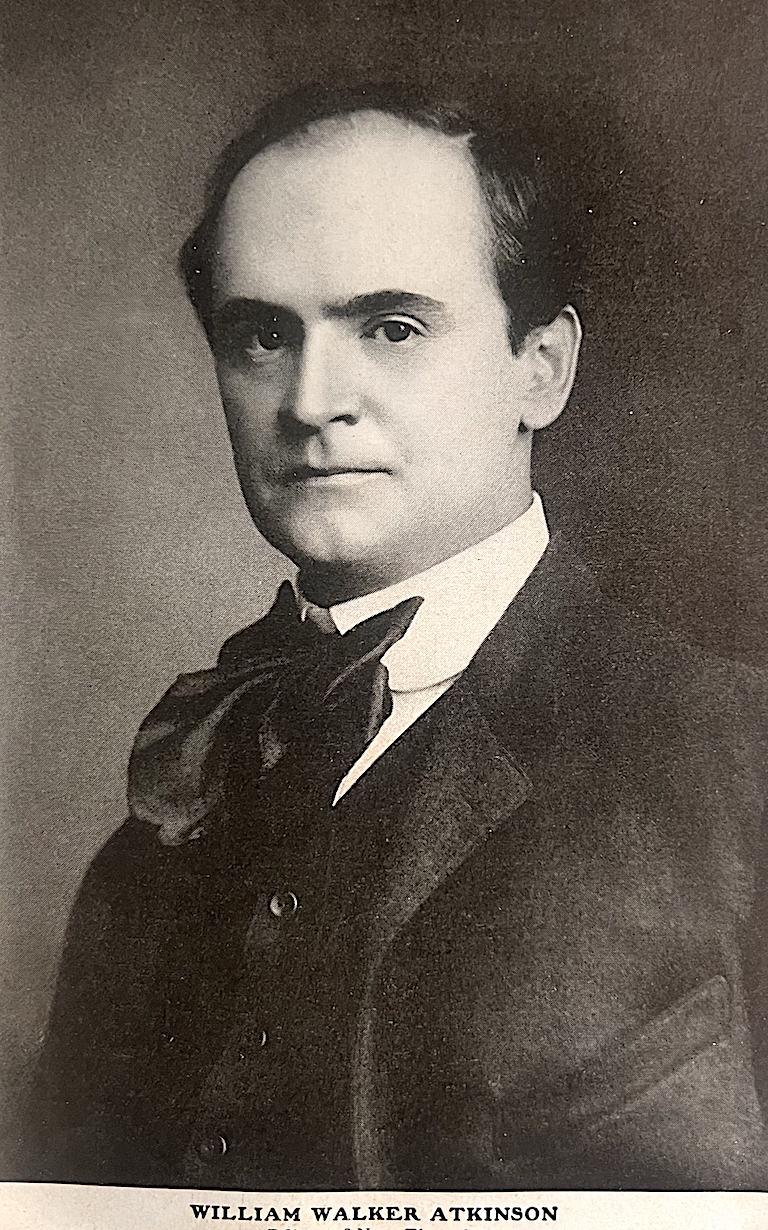
- Pioneer of the New Thought movement
- Born: December 5, 1862; Baltimore, Maryland, U.S.
- Died: November 22, 1932 (aged 69); Los Angeles, California, U.S.
- Occupations: Author; hypnotist
- Writing career
- Pen name: Theron Q. Dumont; Yogi Ramacharaka

William Walker Atkinson (December 5, 1862 – November 22, 1932) was an American attorney, publisher, author, and pioneer of the New Thought movement. He is the presumed author of the pseudonymous works attributed to Theron Q. Dumont and Yogi Ramacharaka.

He wrote an estimated 100 books, all in the last 30 years of his life. He was mentioned in past editions of Who's Who in America, in Religious Leaders of America, and in similar publications. His works have remained in print more or less continuously since 1900.

== Family and early career ==
William Walker Atkinson was born in Baltimore, Maryland, on December 5, 1862, to Emma and William Atkinson. He began his working life as a grocer at 15 years old. He married Margret Foster Black of Beverly, New Jersey, in October 1889, and they had two children. Their first child died young. The second later married and had two daughters.

Atkinson pursued a business career from 1882 onwards and in 1894 he was admitted as an attorney to the Bar of Pennsylvania. While he gained much material success in his profession as a lawyer, the stress and over-strain eventually took its toll, and during this time he experienced a complete physical and mental breakdown, and financial disaster. He looked for healing and in 1900 he found it with suggestive therapeutics, later attributing the restoration of his health, mental vigor and material prosperity to the application of the principles of New Thought.

== New Thought magazine ==
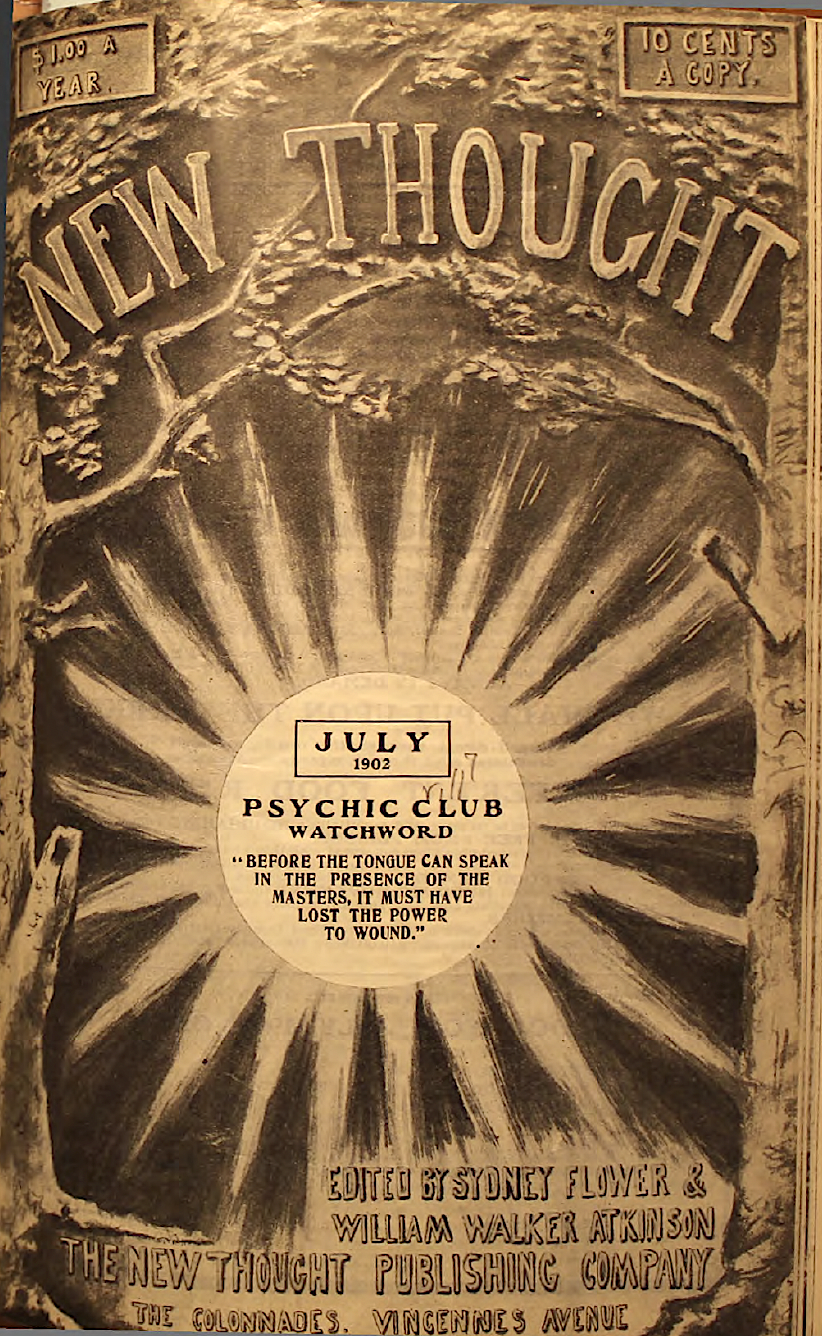
New Thought magazine, edited by Flower and Atkinson, July 1902

In December, 1901 he assumed editorship of New Thought magazine, a post which he held until 1905. During these years he built for himself an enduring place in the hearts of its readers with article after article flowing from his pen. Meanwhile, he also founded his own Success Circle and briefly ran his Atkinson School of Mental Science. Both were located in the same building as the Psychic Research Company and New Thought Publishing Company.

== Publishing career and use of pseudonyms ==
Atkinson wrote under many pseudonyms and false personas. His work was released by a series of publishing houses with shared addresses, and these personas wrote for a series of magazines with a shared roster of authors, all edited by Atkinson. His pseudonymous authors acted first as contributors to the periodicals and were then spun off into their own book-writing careers, with most of their books being released by Atkinson's own publishing houses

The magazine Advanced Thought, billed as A Journal of The New Thought, Practical Psychology, Yogi Philosophy, Constructive Occultism, Metaphysical Healing, Etc. was edited by Atkinson, and advertised articles by Atkinson and Theron Q. Dumont—the latter two were later credited to Atkinson—and had the same address as The Yogi Publishing Society, which published the works attributed to Yogi Ramacharaka. Advanced Thought carried articles by Swami Bhakta Vishita, but when it came time for Vishita's writings to be collected in book form, they were not published by the Yogi Publishing Society. Instead they were published by The Advanced Thought Publishing Co., the same house that brought out the Theron Q. Dumont books and published Advanced Thought.

He was responsible for helping to publish the magazines Suggestion (1900–1901), New Thought (1901–1905) and Advanced Thought (1906–1916). Atkinson was a past president of the International New Thought Alliance.

== False personas ==
In the 1890s, Atkinson became interested in Hinduism. After 1900, he promoted yoga and Oriental occultism in the West.

Atkinson claimed to have an Indian co-author, which was common among the New Thought and New Age writers of his era, who often embraced a vaguely exotic theme of "orientalism" in their writings and credited Hindus, Buddhists, or Sikhs with possession of special knowledge and secret techniques of clairvoyance, spiritual development, sexual energy, health, or longevity. (Note: The way had been paved in the mid- to late 19th century by Paschal Beverly Randolph, who wrote in his books Eulis and Seership that he had been taught the mysteries of mirror scrying by the deposed Indian Maharajah Dalip Singh. Randolph was known for embellishing the truth when it came to his own autobiography (he claimed that his mother Flora Randolph, an African American woman from Virginia, who died when he was eleven years old, had been a foreign princess) but he was actually telling the truth—or something very close to it, according to his biographer John Patrick Deveney—when he said that he had met the Maharajah in Europe and had learned from him the proper way to use both polished gemstones and Indian "bhattah mirrors" in divination.)

Atkinson started writing a series of books under the name Yogi Ramacharaka in 1903, ultimately releasing more than a dozen titles under this pseudonym. The Ramacharaka books were published by the Yogi Publication Society in Chicago and reached more people than Atkinson's New Thought works did.

Atkinson created two more Indian personas, Swami Bhakta Vishita and Swami Panchadasi. Neither of these identities wrote on Hinduism, instead focusing on divination and mediumship, including "oriental" forms of clairvoyance and seership. Of the two, Swami Bhakta Vishita was more popular, and with more than 30 titles to his credit, he eventually outsold the Yogi Ramacharaka persona.

During the 1910s, Atkinson created another persona, that of Theron Q. Dumont. This entity was supposed to be French, and his works, written in English and published in Chicago, combined an interest in New Thought with ideas about the training of the will, memory enhancement, and personal magnetism.

=== Dual career and later years ===
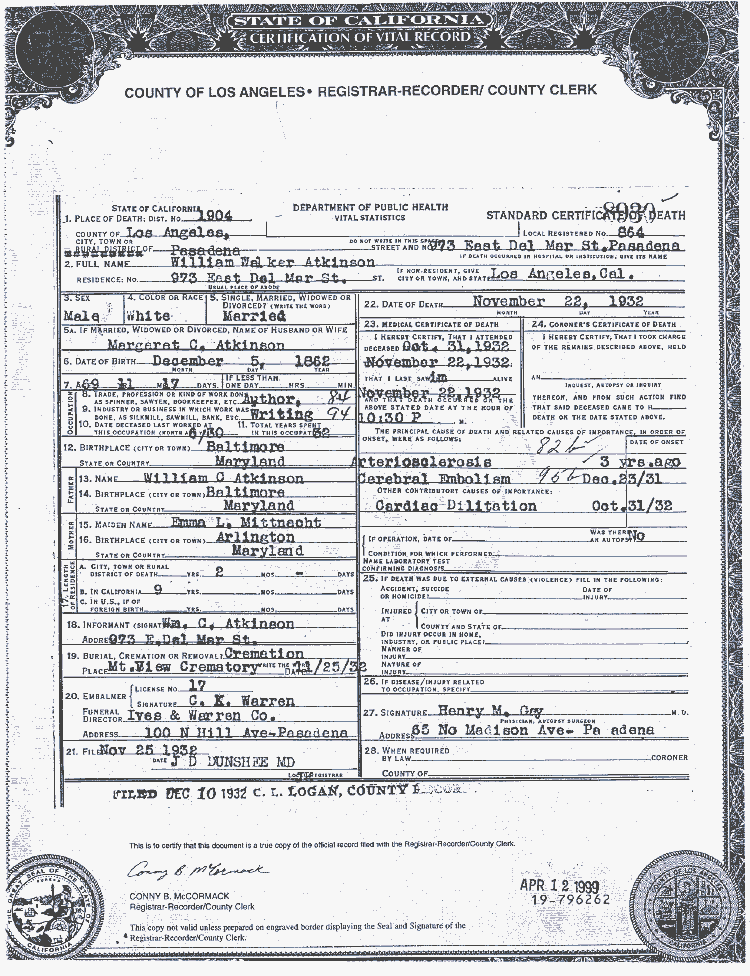
Death Certificate for William Walker Atkinson

In 1903, the same year that he began his writing career as Yogi Ramacharaka, Atkinson was admitted to the Bar of Illinois.

In addition to writing and publishing a steady stream of books and pamphlets, Atkinson started writing articles for Elizabeth Towne's New Thought magazine Nautilus, as early as November 1912, while from 1916 to 1919, he simultaneously edited his own journal Advanced Thought. During this same period he also found time to assume the role of the honorary president of the International New Thought Alliance.

Among the last collaborators with whom Atkinson may have been associated was the mentalist C. Alexander, "The Crystal Seer," whose New Thought booklet of affirmative prayer, Personal Lessons, Codes, and Instructions for Members of the Crystal Silence League, published in Los Angeles during the 1920s, contained on its last page an advertisement for an extensive list of books by Atkinson, Dumont, Ramacharaka, Vishita, and Atkinson's possible collaborator, the cult leader and self styled spiritual authority on occultism, L. W. de Laurence.

=== Death ===
Atkinson died November 22, 1932, in Los Angeles, California, at the age of 69.

== Writings ==
Atkinson was a prolific writer whose books achieved wide circulation among New Thought devotees and occult practitioners. He published under several pen names, including Magus Incognito, Theodore Sheldon, Theron Q. Dumont, Swami Panchadasi, Yogi Ramacharaka, Swami Bhakta Vishita, and probably other names not identified. He is also popularly held to be one (if not all) of the Three Initiates who anonymously authored The Kybalion.

A major collection of Atkinson's works is among the holdings of a Brazilian organization called Circulo de Estudos Ramacháraca. According to this group, Atkinson has been identified as the author or co-author (with individuals such as Edward E. Beals and Lauron William de Laurence) of 105 separate titles. These can be broken down roughly into the following groups:

=== Titles written under the name William Walker Atkinson ===
These works treat themes related to the mental world, occultism, divination, psychic reality, and mankind's nature. They constitute a basis for what Atkinson called "New Psychology" or "New Thought". Titles include Thought Vibration or the Law of Attraction in the Thought World, and Practical Psychomancy and Crystal Gazing: A Course of Lessons on the Psychic Phenomena of Distant Sensing, Clairvoyance, Psychometry, Crystal Gazing, etc..

Although most of the Atkinson titles were published by Atkinson's own Advanced Thought Publishing Company in Chicago, with English distribution by L. N. Fowler of London, England, at least a few of his books in the "New Psychology" series were published by Elizabeth Towne in Mount Holyoke, Massachusetts, and offered for sale in her New Thought magazine The Nautilus. One such title, for which Atkinson is credited as the author, with the copyright internally assigned to Towne, is The Psychology of Salesmanship, published in 1912. The probable reason that Atkinson made an assignment of copyright to Towne is that his "New Psychology" books had initially been serialized in Towne's magazine, where he was a freelance writer from 1912 at least through 1914.

=== Titles written under pseudonyms ===
These include Atkinson's teachings on Yoga and Oriental philosophy, as well as New Thought and occult titles. They were written in such a way as to form a course of practical instruction.

Yogi Ramacharaka titles

When Atkinson wrote under the pseudonym Yogi Ramacharaka, he claimed to be a Hindu. As Ramacharaka, he helped to popularize Eastern concepts in America, with Yoga and a broadly-interpreted Hinduism being particular areas of focus. The works of Yogi Ramacharaka were published over the course of nearly ten years beginning in 1903. Some were originally issued as a series of lectures delivered at the frequency of one lesson per month. Additional material was issued at each interval in the form of supplementary text books.

Ramacharaka's Advanced Course in Yoga Philosophy and Oriental Occultism remains popular in some circles.

According to Atkinson's publisher, the Yogi Publication Society, some of these titles were inspired by a student of the "real" Yogi Ramacharaka, Baba Bharata, although there is no historical record that either of these individuals ever existed.

Swami Bhakta Vishita titles

Atkinson's second Hindu-sounding pseudonym, Swami Bhakta Vishita, billed as "The Hindoo Master" did not write on the topic of Hinduism. His best-known titles were "The Development of Seership: The Science of Knowing the Future; Hindoo and Oriental Methods" (1915), "Genuine Mediumship, or Invisible Powers", and "Can We Talk to Spirit Friends?" Atkinson produced more than two dozen Swami Bhakta Vishita books, plus a half-dozen saddle-stitched paper pamphlets under the Vishita name. All of them dealt with clairvoyance, mediumship, and the afterlife. Like Ramacharaka, Vishita was listed as a regular contributor to Atkinson's Advanced Thought magazine, but his books were published by the Advanced Thought Publishing Company, not by the Yogi Publication Society, which handled the Ramacharaka titles.

Swami Panchadasi titles

The work that Atkinson produced under his third Hindu-sounding pseudonym, Swami Panchadasi, failed to capture a wide general audience. The subject matter, clairvoyance and occult powers, was not authentically Hindu, either.

Theron Q. Dumont titles

As Theron Q. Dumont, Atkinson stated on the title pages of his works that he was an "Instructor on the Art and Science of Personal Magnetism, Paris, France"—a claim manifestly untrue, as he was an American living in the United States.

The Atkinson titles released under the Dumont name were primarily concerned with self-improvement and the development of mental will power and self-confidence. Among them were Practical Memory Training, The Art and Science of Personal Magnetism, The Power of Concentration, and The Advanced Course in Personal Magnetism: The Secrets of Mental Fascination, The Human Machine', Mastermind.

Theodore Sheldon titles

The health and healing book, Vim Culture has often been attributed to William Walker Atkinson. Theodore Sheldon does not appear to be the same person as T. J. Shelton, who (like Atkinson) wrote on subjects related to health and healing for The Nautilus magazine and was also one of several honorary presidents of the International New Thought Alliance. Discovery of a 1925 letter from Theodore Sheldon to Florence Sabin of Johns Hopkins University provides evidence of Theodore Sheldon's existence as an actual person, apart from William Walker Atkinson. The original copy of this letter was located in Florence Sabin's university archives and makes reference to Ms. Sabin as Theodore Sheldon's childhood teacher from "the banks of Lake Geneva," which is important biographical data about an otherwise unknown writer. While it's possible that Atkinson could have been a ghost writer or contributor to Sheldon's work, the personal nature of Sheldon's correspondence with Florence Sabin would have been very difficult for Atkinson to fabricate, suggesting that Theodore Sheldon was more than an Atkinson pen name.

Magus Incognito titles

The Secret Doctrines of the Rosicrucians by Magus Incognito consisted of a nearly verbatim republication of portions of The Arcane Teachings, an anonymous work attributed to Atkinson (see below).

Three Initiates

Ostensibly written by "Three Initiates," The Kybalion was published by the Yogi Publication Society.

=== Titles Atkinson co-authored ===
With Edward Beals, which may have been another pseudonym, Atkinson wrote the so-called "Personal Power Books"—a group of 12 titles on humanity's internal powers and how to use them. Titles include Faith Power: Your Inspirational Forces and Regenerative Power or Vital Rejuvenation. Due to the lack of information on Edward Beals, many believe this is also a pseudonym.

With fellow Chicago resident L. W. de Laurence, he co-authored Psychomancy and Crystal Gazing. L. W. de Laurence was a publisher and author of numerous books on "occult" subjects, which had influence in several African and Caribbean countries; some of his works are banned in Jamaica.

=== The 'Arcane Teaching' Books ===
A series named The Arcane Teaching is also attributed to Atkinson. Significant portions of material from The Arcane Teaching were later re-worked, appearing nearly verbatim in The Secret Doctrines of the Rosicrucians by Magus Incognito (yet another Atkinson alias).

Nothing is known of the first edition of The Arcane Teaching, which apparently consisted of a single volume of the same name.

The second edition was expanded to include three 'supplementary teachings' in pamphlet form. The four titles in this edition were: The Arcane Teaching (hardback), The Arcane Formulas, or Mental Alchemy (pamphlet), The Mystery of Sex, or Sex Polarity (pamphlet), and Vril, or Vital Magnetism (pamphlet). This edition was published by A. C. McClurg—the same publisher who brought out the Tarzan the Ape-Man series by Edgar Rice Burroughs—under the "Arcane Book Concern" imprint, and the name of the publisher, A. C. McClurg, doesn't actually appear anywhere upon the books in this edition. The series bears a 1909 copyright mark, listing the copyright holder as "Arcane Book Concern". There also appears to have been a pamphlet entitled Free Sample Lesson which was published under the "Arcane Book Concern" imprint, indicating that it may have appeared concurrently with this edition.

The third edition split the main title, The Arcane Teaching, into three smaller volumes, bringing the total number of books in the series to six. This edition consisted of the following titles (the three titles marked with an asterisk (*) are the volumes that had appeared together as The Arcane Teaching in the previous edition): The One and the Many* (hardback), Cosmic Law* (hardback), The Psychic Planes* (hardback), The Arcane Formulas, or Mental Alchemy (binding unknown), The Mystery of Sex, or Sex Polarity (binding unknown), and Vril, or Vital Magnetism (binding unknown). The third edition of The Arcane Teaching was published by A. C. McClurg under its own name in 1911. The books in this series bear the original 1909 copyright, plus a 1911 copyright listing "Library Shelf" as the new copyright holder.

=== Other likely pseudonyms ===
Because Atkinson ran his own publishing companies, Advanced Thought Publishing and the Yogi Publication Society, and is known to have used an unusually large number of pseudonyms, other authors published by those companies may also have been his pseudonyms:

- A. Gould and Dr. Franklin L. Dubois (who co-wrote The Science of Sex Regeneration c. 1912);
- Frederick Vollrath (who contributed articles on the subject of "Mental Physical-Culture" to Atkinson's Advanced Thought magazine);
- O. Hashnu Hara. Although is hard to find concrete evidence, the first clue is always the impossibility to find information about the writer, other than the fact that he wrote books published by Atkinson. Books under this name include Practical Yoga, Concentration, and Mental Alchemy, all books with titles similar to other Atkinson's books.

== Bibliographies ==
For ease of study, this bibliography of the works of William Walker Atkinson is divided into sections based on the name Atkinson chose to place on the title page of each work cited.

Bibliography of Atkinson writing as William Walker (or W. W.) Atkinson

- The Art of Expression and the Principles of Discourse. 1910.
- The Art of Logical Thinking. 1909.
- "Attainment with Honor", an article in "The Nautilus" magazine. June 1914.
- The Crucible of Modern Thought. 1910.
- Dynamic Thought or the Law of Vibrant Energy. 1906.
- How to Read Human Nature: Its Inner States and Outer Forms. c.1918
- The Inner Consciousness: A Course of Lessons on the Inner Planes of the Mind, Intuition, Instinct, Automatic Mentation, and Other Wonderful Phases of Mental Phenomena. Chicago. 1908.
- The Law of the New Thought: A Study of Fundamental Principles & Their Application. 1902.
- The Mastery of Being: A Study of the Ultimate Principle of Reality & the Practical Application Thereof. 1911. A portion of this work was republished as a chapter of Pandeism: An Anthology in 2016.
- Memory Culture: The Science of Observing, Remembering and Recalling. 1903.
- Memory: How to Develop, Train, and Use It. c. 1909.
- Mental Fascination. 1907.
- "Mental Pictures", an article in "The Nautilus" magazine. November 1912.
- Mind and Body or Mental States and Physical Conditions. 1910.
- Mind Building of a Child. 1911.
- Mind Power: The Secret of Mental Magic. Advanced Thought Publishing Co., Chicago.1912.
- The New Psychology Its Message, Principles and Practice. 1909.
- New Thought: Its History and Principles or The Message of the New Thought, A Condensed History of Its Real Origin with Statement of Its Basic Principles and True Aims. 1915.
- Nuggets of the New Thought. 1902.
- Practical Mental Influence. 1908.
- Practical Mind-Reading. 1907.
- Practical New Thought: Several Things that Have Helped People. 1911.
- Practical Psychomancy and Crystal Gazing, a course of Lessons on the Psychic Phenomena of Distant Sensing, Clairvoyance, Psychometry, Crystal Gazing, etc. Advanced Thought Publishing Co. Masonic Temple, Chicago. 1907.
- The Psychology of Salesmanship. 1912.
- Reincarnation and the Law of Karma. 1908.
- Scientific Parenthood. 1911.
- The Secret of Mental Magic: A Course of Seven Lessons. 1907.
- The Secret of Success. 1908.
- Self-Healing by Thought Force. 1907.
- A Series of lessons in Personal Magnetism, Psychic Influence, Thought-force, Concentration, Will-Power, and practical Mental Science. 1901.
- The Subconscious and the Superconscious Planes of Mind. 1909.
- Suggestion and Auto-Suggestion. 1915.
- Telepathy: Its Theory, Facts, and Proof. 1910.
- Thought-Culture or Practical Mental Training. 1909.
- Thought-Force in Business and Everyday Life. Chicago. 1900.
- Thought Vibration or the Law of Attraction in the Thought World. Chicago. 1906.
- Your Mind and How to Use It: A Manual of Practical Psychology. 1911.
- "How To Develop Perception," an article in "The Nautilus" magazine. July 1929.
- The Seven Cosmic Laws. March 1931. (Published posthumously in 2011)

Bibliography of Atkinson writing as Yogi Ramacharaka

- The Hindu-Yogi Science of Breath (A Complete Manual of the Oriental Breathing Philosophy of Physical, Mental, Psychic and Spiritual Development). 1903.
- Fourteen Lessons in Yogi Philosophy and Oriental Occultism. 1904.
- Advanced Course in Yogi Philosophy and Oriental Occultism. 1905.
- Hatha Yoga or the Yogi Philosophy of Physical Well-Being (With Numerous Exercises, Etc.) 1904.
- The Science of Psychic Healing. 1906.
- Raja Yoga or Mental Development (A Series of Lessons in Raja Yoga). 1906.
- Gnani Yoga (A Series of Lessons in Gnani Yoga). 1907.
- The Inner Teachings of the Philosophies and Religions of India. 1909.
- Mystic Christianity: The Inner Teachings of the Master. 1908.
- The Life Beyond Death. 1909.
- The Practical Water Cure (As Practiced in India and Other Oriental Countries). 1909.
- The Spirit of the Upanishads or the Aphorisms of the Wise. 1907.
- Bhagavad Gita or The Message of the Master. 1907.

Bibliography of Atkinson writing as Swami Bhakta Vishita

- Can We Talk to Spirit Friends?
- Clairvoyance and Kindred Phenomena.
- Clairvoyance: Past, Present and Future.
- Crystal Seering by Seers of All Ages. (Pamphlet)
- The Development of Seership: The Science of Knowing the Future; Hindoo and Oriental Methods". Advanced Thought Publishing Co. Chicago. 1915 (1 of 2 Actual Books)
- The Difference Between a Seer and a Medium. (Pamphlet)
- The Future Evolution of Humanity.
- Genuine Mediumship or The Invisible Powers. Advanced Thought Publishing Co. Chicago. 1910 (1 of 2 Actual Books)
- Ghosts of the Living, End of the Dead.
- The Great Universe Beyond and Immortality.
- The Higher Being Developed by Seership.
- Higher Spirit Manifestations.
- How Is It Possible to Foretell the Future? (Pamphlet)
- How Seership Develops a Constructive Life.
- How to Attain Knowledge of the Higher Worlds.
- How to Cross the Threshold of the Super World.
- How to Develop Mediumship.
- How to Develop Psychic Telepathy.
- How to Distinguish Real Seership from Unreal. (Pamphlet)
- How to Gain Personal Knowledge of the Higher Truths of Seership.
- How to Go Into the Silence: The Key of All Life. (Pamphlet)
- How to Interpret the Present and Future Exactly as They Are Designed to Be.
- Mediumship.
- Mental Vibrations and Transmission.
- The Mystic Sixth Sense.
- Nature's Finer Forces.
- Seership and the Spiritual Evolution of Man.
- Seership, a Practical Guide to Those Who Aspire to Develop the Higher Senses.
- Seership, the Science of Knowing the Future.
- The Spiritual Laws Governing Seership.
- Thought Transference.
- What Determines a Man's Birth in a Certain Environment? (Pamphlet)

Bibliography of Atkinson writing as Swami Panchadasi

- Clairvoyance and Occult Powers. 1916.
- The Human Aura:Astral Colors and Thought Forms. 1912. (Outlines his interpretation of the meaning of the various colors of the human aura)
- The Astral World. Advanced Thought Publishing Co. Chicago. 1915.

Bibliography of Atkinson writing as Theron Q. Dumont

- The Art and Science of Personal Magnetism: The Secrets of Mental Fascination. Advanced Thought Publishing Co. Chicago. 1913.
- The Advanced Course in Personal Magnetism: The Secrets of Mental Fascination. Advanced Thought Publishing Co. Chicago. 1914.
- The Psychology of Personal Magnetism. (This version is copy of Advanced Course in Personal Magnetism)
- The Master Mind or The Key To Mental Power Development And Efficiency.
- Mental Therapeutics, or Just How to Heal Oneself and Others. Advanced Thought Publishing Co. Chicago. 1916.
- The Power of Concentration. Advanced Thought Publishing Co. Chicago. 1918.
- Practical Memory Training. Advanced Thought Publishing Co. Chicago.
- The Solar Plexus or Abdominal Brain.
- Successful Salesmanship.
- The Human Machine. (Arnold Bennett, not Atkinson)

Bibliography of Theodore Sheldon (possibly an Atkinson pseudonym)

- Vim Culture.

Bibliography of "Three Initiates" (possibly an Atkinson pseudonym)

- The Kybalion Yogi Publication Society. 1908.

Bibliography of Atkinson writing as Magus Incognito

- The Secret Doctrines of the Rosicrucians. 1918.

Bibliography of Atkinson writing with co-authors

- W. W. Atkinson and Edward Beals. Personal Power Volume I: Personal Power
- W. W. Atkinson and Edward Beals. Personal Power Volume II: Creative Power
- W. W. Atkinson and Edward Beals. Personal Power Volume III: Desire Power
- W. W. Atkinson and Edward Beals. Personal Power Volume IV: Faith Power: Your Inspirational Forces.
- W. W. Atkinson and Edward Beals. Personal Power Volume V: Will Power
- W. W. Atkinson and Edward Beals. Personal Power Volume VI: Subconscious Power
- W. W. Atkinson and Edward Beals. Personal Power Volume VII: Spiritual Power
- W. W. Atkinson and Edward Beals. Personal Power Volume VIII: Thought Power
- W. W. Atkinson and Edward Beals. Personal Power Volume IX: Perceptive Power
- W. W. Atkinson and Edward Beals. Personal Power Volume X: Reasoning Power
- W. W. Atkinson and Edward Beals. Personal Power Volume XI: Character Power
- W. W. Atkinson and Edward Beals. Personal Power Volume XII: Regenerative Power or Vital Rejuvenation.
- W. W. Atkinson and L. W. De Laurence. Psychomancy and Crystal Gazing.

Bibliography of anonymous works attributed to Atkinson

- The Arcane Teachings. Chicago. n.p., n.d. [presumed 1st edition prior to 1909]; McClurg, 1909.
- The Arcane Teachings: Free Sample Lesson. Chicago. McClurg, 1909.
- The Arcane Formulas, or Mental Alchemy. Chicago. McClurg, 1909; McClurg, 1911.
- The Mystery of Sex, or Sex Polarity. Chicago. McClurg, 1909; McClurg, 1911.
- Vril, or Vital Magnetism The Secret Doctrine of Ancient Atlantis, Egypt, Chaldea, and Greece. Chicago. McClurg, 1909; McClurg, 1911.
- The One and the Many. Chicago. McClurg, 1911.
- Cosmic Law. Chicago. McClurg, 1911.
- The Psychic Planes. Chicago. McClurg, 1911.
