= Fortune-telling =

Practice of predicting information about a person's life

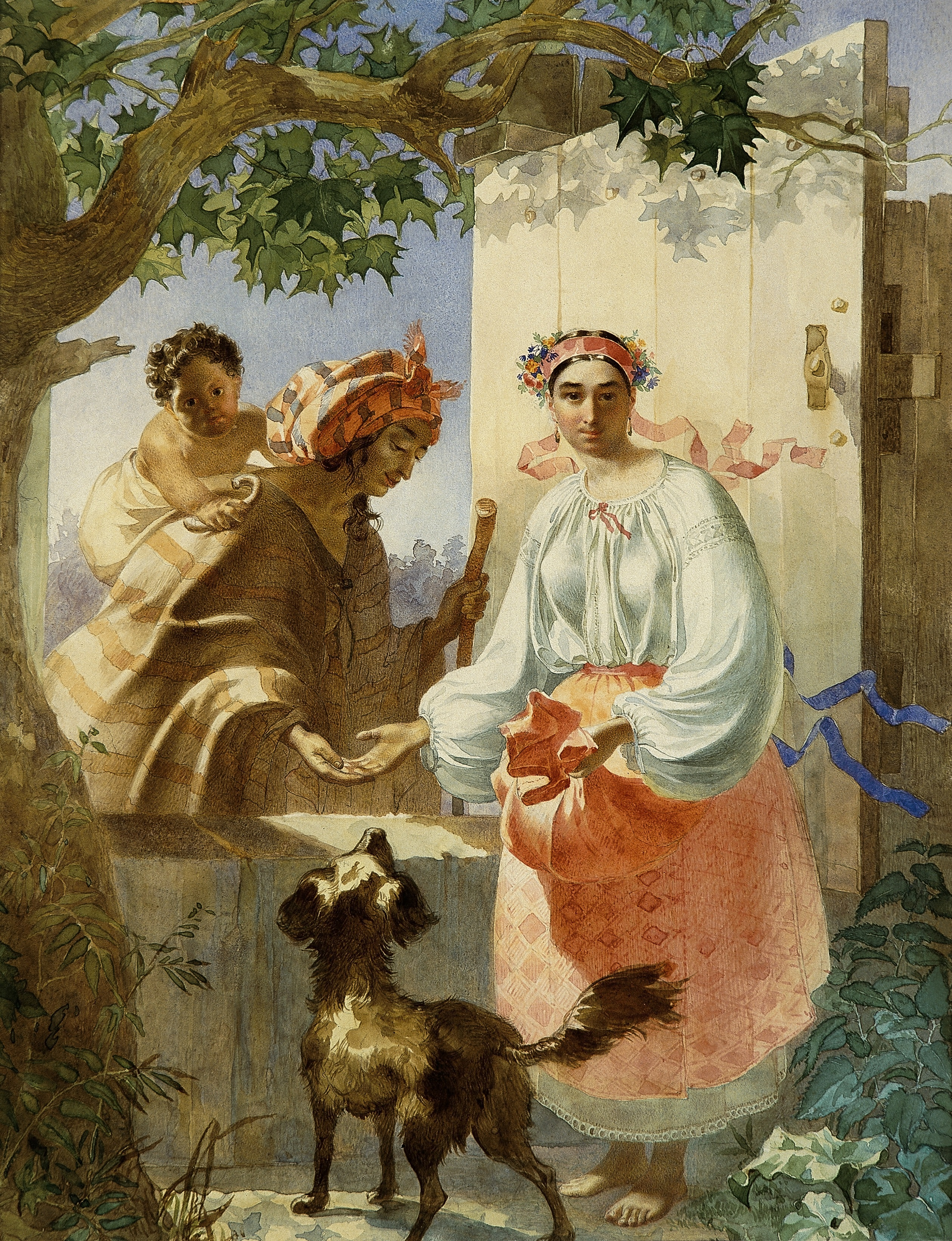
Gypsy Fortune-Teller (1841) by Taras Shevchenko

Fortune-telling is the spiritual practice of predicting information about a person's life. The scope of fortune telling is in principle identical with the practice of divination. The difference is that divination is the term used for predictions considered part of a religious ritual, invoking deities or spirits, while the term fortune telling implies a less serious or formal setting, even one of popular culture, where belief in occult workings behind the prediction is less prominent than the concept of suggestion, spiritual or practical advisory or affirmation.

Historically, Pliny the Elder describes use of the crystal ball in the 1st century CE by soothsayers ("crystallum orbis", later written in Medieval Latin by scribes as orbuculum). Contemporary Western images of fortune telling grow out of folkloristic reception of Renaissance magic, specifically associated with Romani people. During the 19th and 20th century, methods of divination from non-Western cultures, such as the I Ching, were also adopted as methods of fortune telling in Western popular culture.

An example of divination or fortune telling as purely an item of pop culture, with little or no vestiges of belief in the occult, would be the Magic 8 Ball sold as a toy by Mattel, or Paul the Octopus, an octopus at the Sea Life Aquarium at Oberhausen used to predict the outcome of matches played by the Germany national football team. There is opposition to fortune telling in Christianity, Islam, Baháʼísm and Judaism based on scriptural prohibitions against divination. Terms for one who claims to see into the future include fortune teller, crystal-gazer, spaewife, seer, soothsayer, sibyl, clairvoyant, and prophet; related terms which might include this among other abilities are oracle, augur, and visionary. Fortune telling is dismissed by skeptics as being based on pseudoscience, magical thinking and superstition.

A person who practices this art is called a fortune teller.

== Methods ==
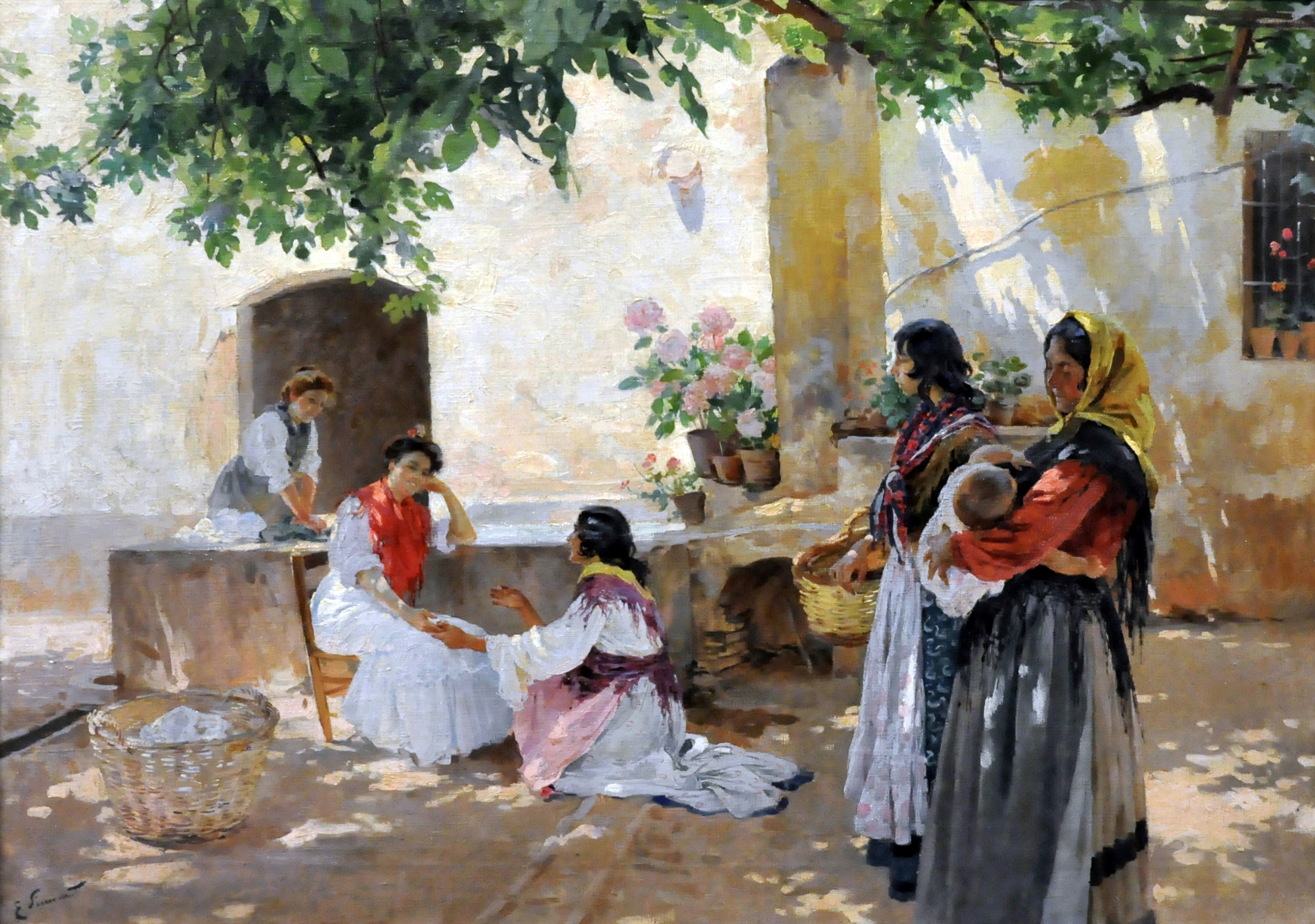
The Fortune Teller, by Enrique Simonet (1899; canvas; Museo de Málaga), depicting a palm reading

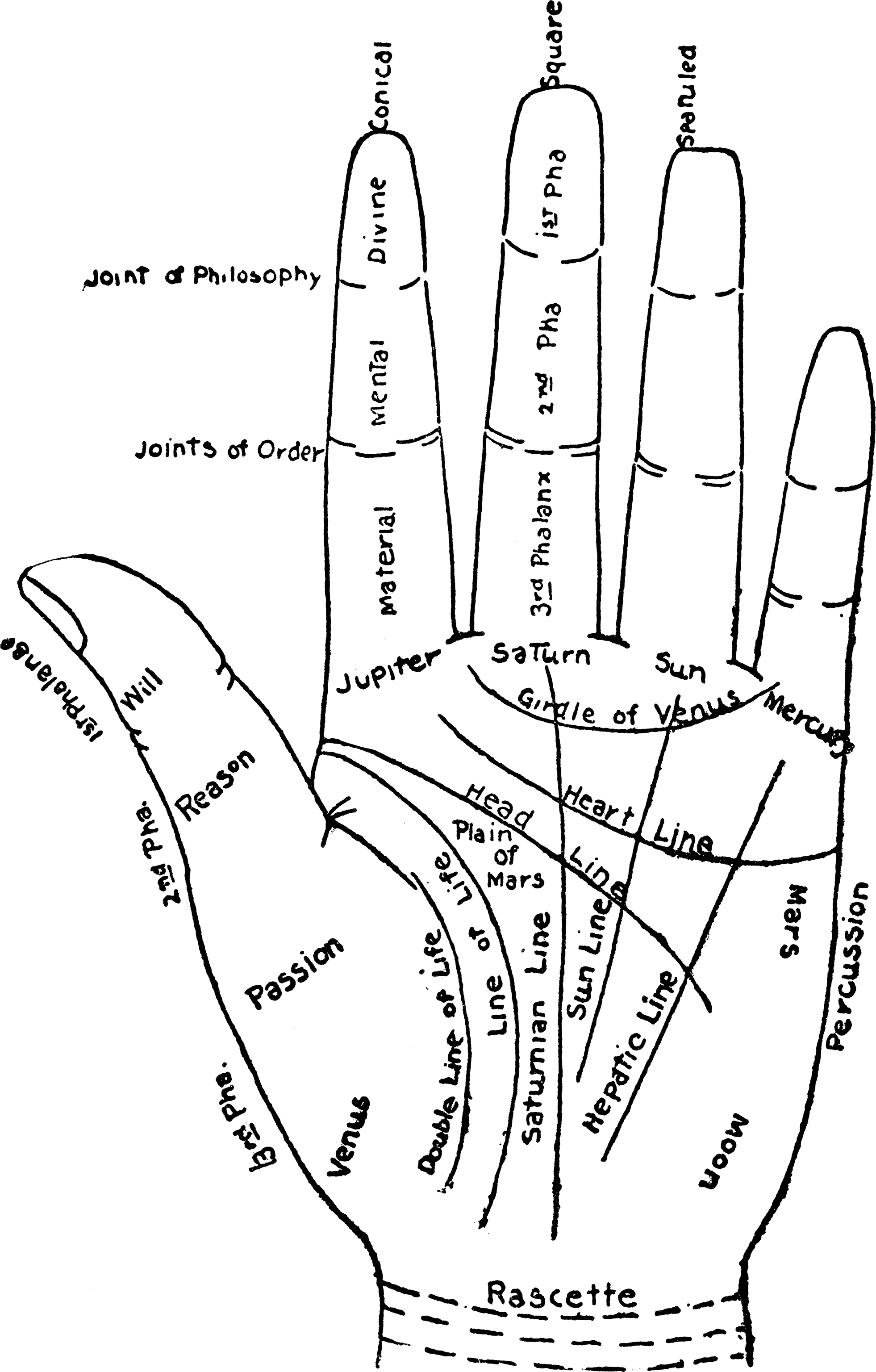
Chart of the hand

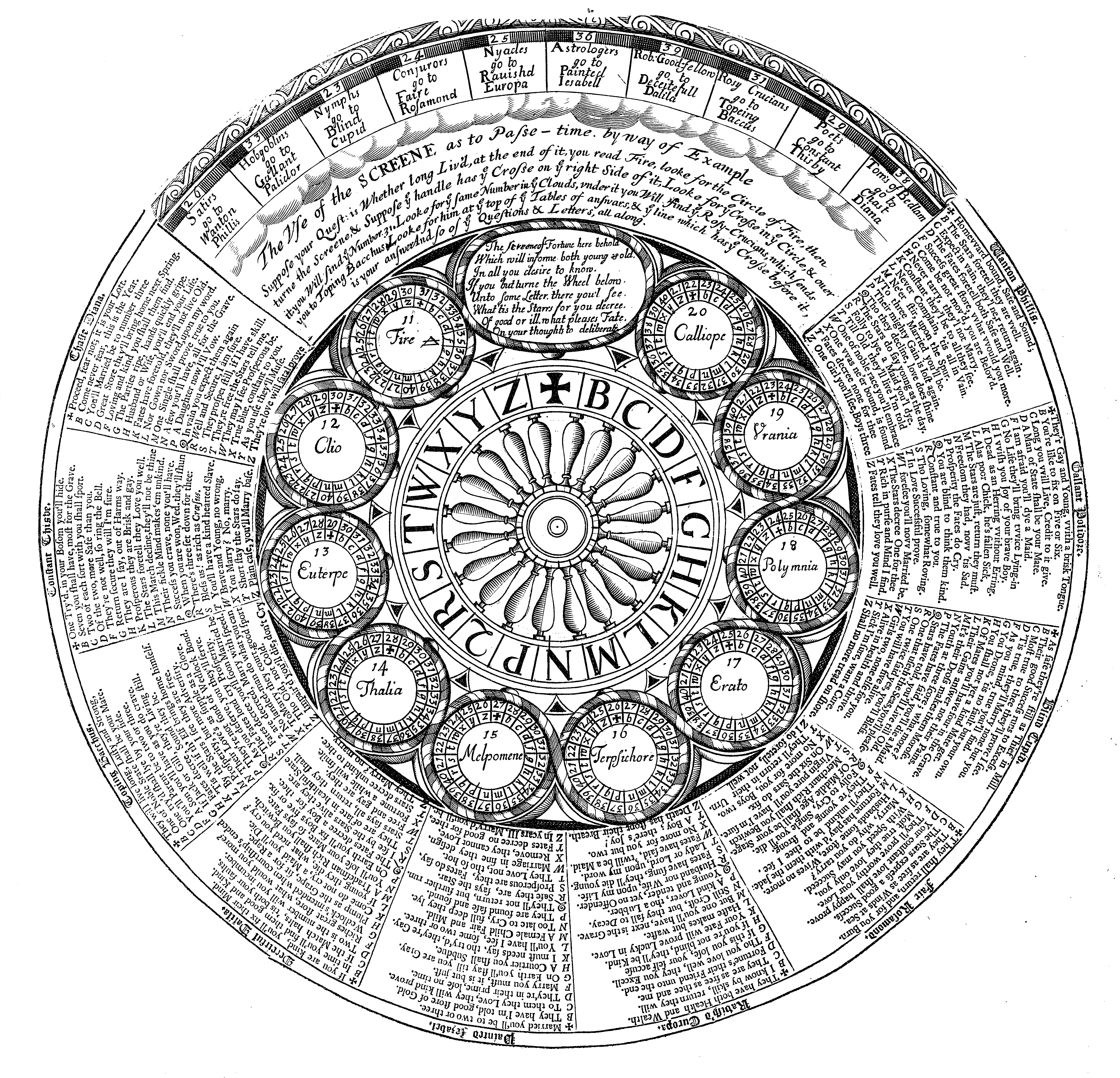
The screene of fortune here behold, fortune-telling game, c.1650–1750

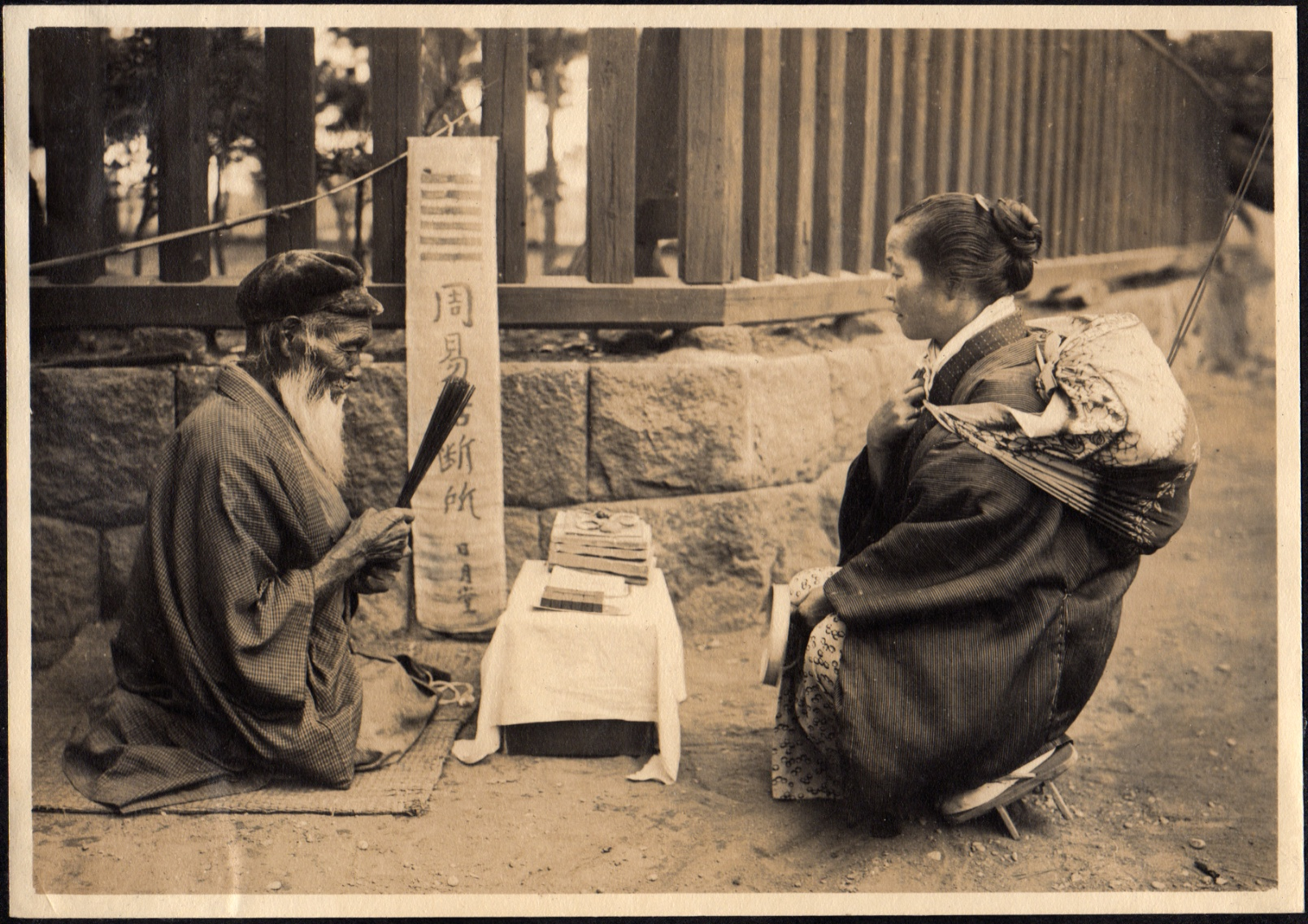
Japanese fortune teller using the I Ching, 1914

Common methods used for fortune telling in Europe and the Americas include astromancy, horary astrology, pendulum reading, spirit board reading, tasseography (reading tea leaves in a cup), cartomancy (fortune telling with cards), tarot card reading, crystallomancy (reading of a crystal sphere), and chiromancy (palmistry, reading of the palms). The last three have traditional associations in the popular mind with the Roma and Sinti people.

Another form of fortune telling, sometimes called "reading" or "spiritual consultation", does not rely on specific devices or methods, but rather the practitioner gives the client advice and predictions which are said to have come from spirits or in visions:

- Aeromancy: by interpreting atmospheric conditions
- Alectromancy: by observation of a rooster pecking at grain
- Aleuromancy: by flour
- Astrology: by the movements of celestial bodies
- Astromancy: by the stars
- Augury: by the flight of birds
- Auramancy by someone's aura or feelings
- Bazi or four pillars: by hour, day, month, and year of birth
- Bibliomancy: by books; frequently, but not always, religious texts
- Cartomancy: by playing cards, tarot cards, or oracle cards
- Ceromancy: by patterns in melting or dripping wax
- Chiromancy: by the shape of the hands and lines in the palms
- Chronomancy: by determination of lucky and unlucky days
- Clairvoyance: by spiritual vision or inner sight
- Cleromancy: by casting of lots, or casting bones or stones
- Cold reading: by using visual and aural clues
- Crystallomancy: by crystal ball also called scrying
- Extispicy: by the entrails of animals
- Face reading: by means of variations in face and head shape
- Feng shui: by earthen harmony
- Gastromancy: by stomach-based ventriloquism (historically)
- Geomancy: by markings in the ground, sand, earth, or soil
- Hafez fal: by poems of Ḥāfeẓ-e Shīrāzī
- Haruspicy: by the livers of sacrificed animals
- Horary astrology: the astrology of the time the question was asked
- Hydromancy: by water
- I Ching divination: by yarrow stalks or coins and the I Ching
- Kau cim by means of numbered bamboo sticks shaken from a tube
- Lithomancy: by stones or gems
- Molybdomancy: by molten metal after dumped in cold water
- Naeviology: by moles, scars, or other bodily marks
- Necromancy: by the dead, or by spirits or souls of the dead
- Nephomancy: by shapes of clouds
- Numerology: by numbers
- Oneiromancy: by dreams
- Onomancy: by names
- Onychomancy: by a form of palmistry looking at the fingernails
- Palmistry: by lines and mounds on the hand
- Parrot astrology: by parakeets picking up fortune cards
- Paper fortune teller: origami used in fortune-telling games
- Pendulum reading: by the movements of a suspended object
- Pyromancy: by gazing into fire
- Rhabdomancy: divination by rods
- Runecasting or Runic divination: by runes
- Scrying: by looking at or into reflective objects
- Spirit board: by planchette or talking board
- Taromancy: by a form of cartomancy using tarot cards
- Tasseography or tasseomancy: by tea leaves or coffee grounds
- Tyromancy: by observing cheese

== Sociology ==
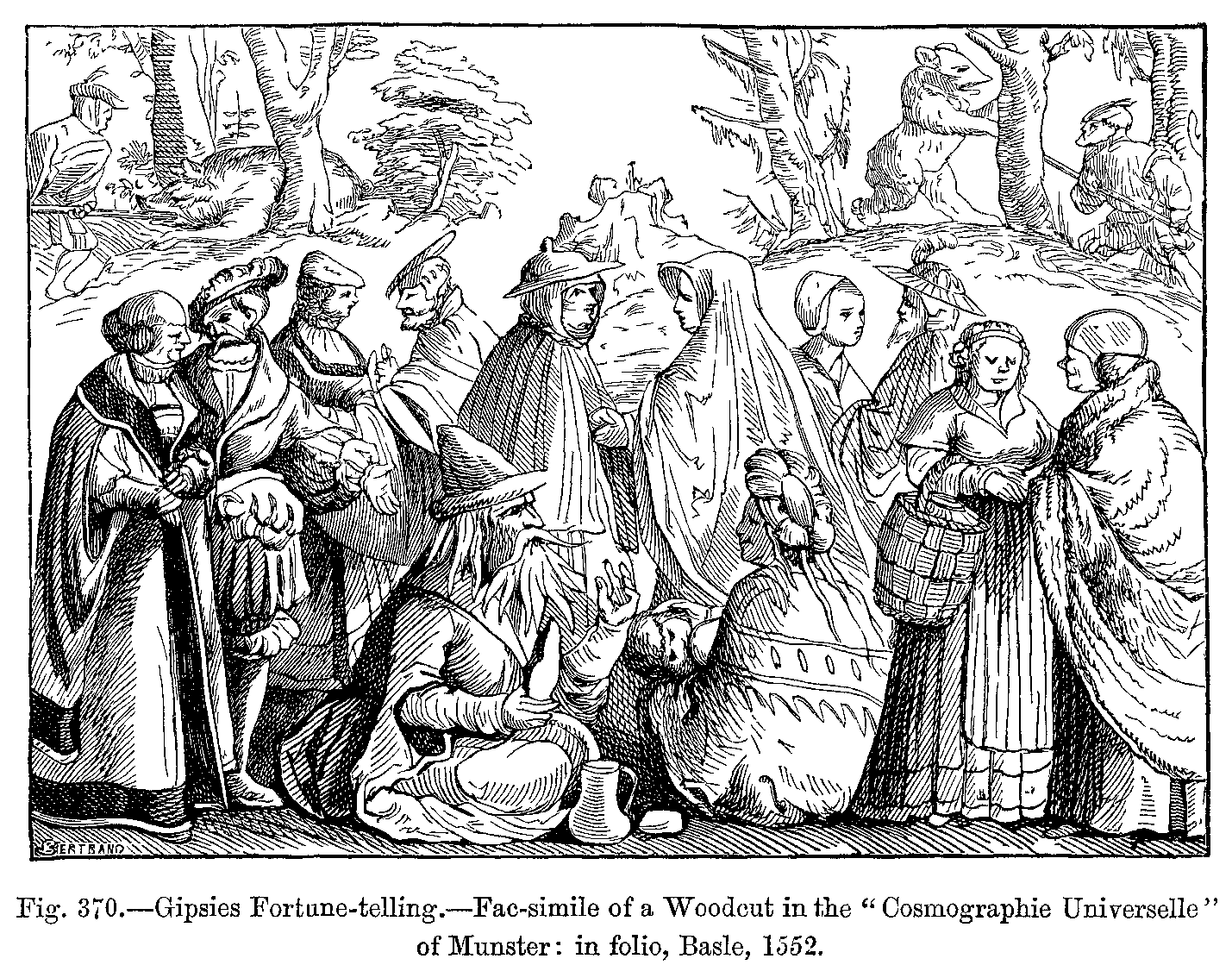
Romani fortune telling. Facsimile of a woodcut in Cosmographia universalis of Sebastian Münster

Western fortune tellers typically attempt predictions on matters such as future romantic, financial, and childbearing prospects. Many fortune tellers will also give "character readings". These may use numerology, graphology, palmistry (if the subject is present), and astrology.

In contemporary Western culture, it appears that women consult fortune tellers more than men. Some women have maintained long relationships with their personal readers. Telephone consultations with psychics grew in popularity through the 1990s, and by the 2010s additional contact methods such as email and videoconferencing also became available, but none of these have completely replaced traditional in-person methods of consultation.

== Children's fortune-telling games ==
Children's fortune-telling games are informal activities that mimic traditional divination practices, often serving as a form of play rather than serious attempts to predict the future. These games are prevalent in various cultures and have been documented in folklore studies. They are often played with simple objects like folded paper or pencils like MASH and the paper fortune teller (a.k.a. cootie catcher).

== As a business ==
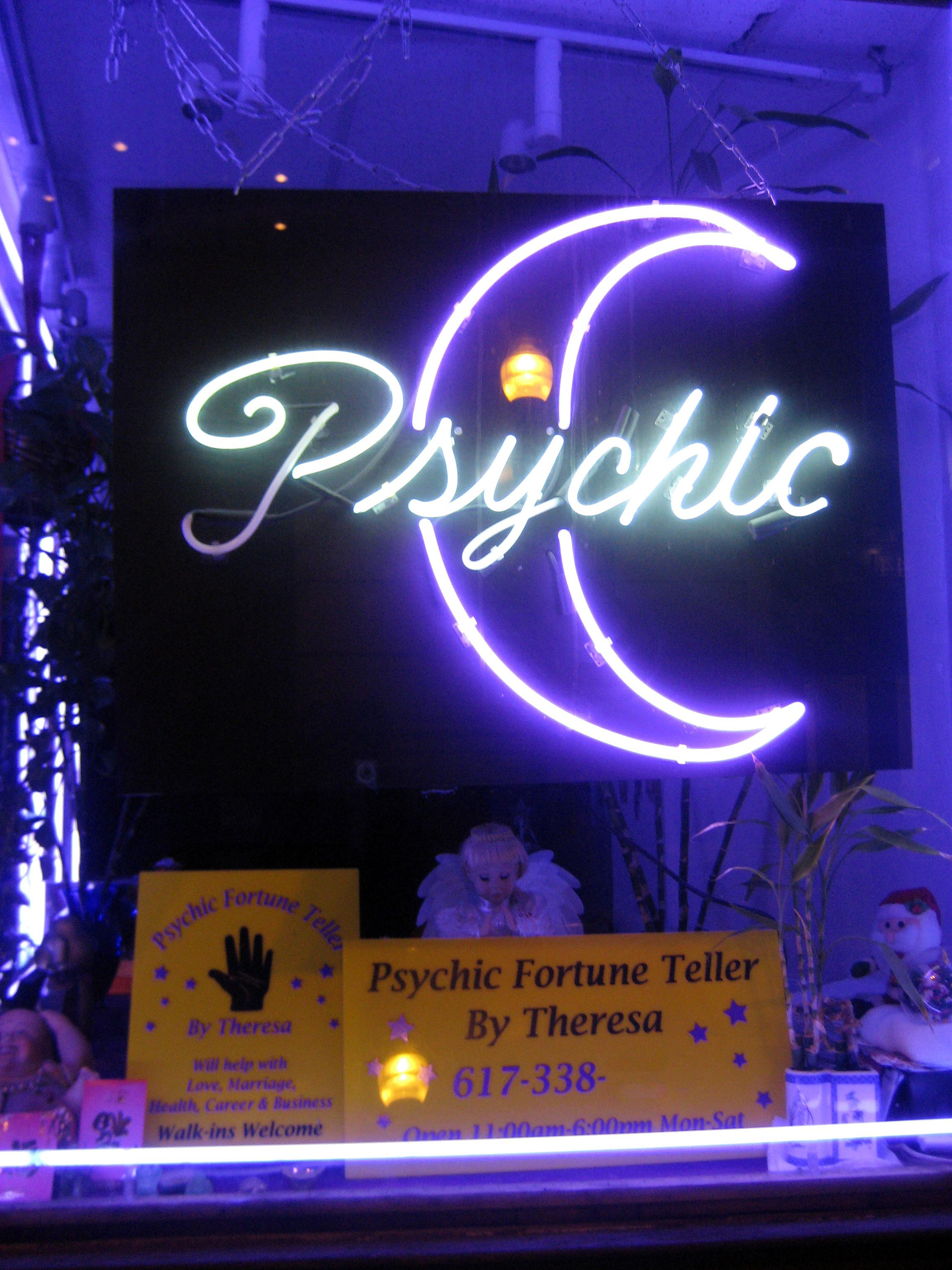
Storefront psychic fortune teller in Boston

Discussing the role of fortune telling in society, Ronald H. Isaacs, an American rabbi and author, opined, "Since time immemorial humans have longed to learn that which the future holds for them. Thus, in ancient civilization, and even today with fortune telling as a true profession, humankind continues to be curious about its future, both out of sheer curiosity as well as out of desire to better prepare for it." Although soothsayers were viewed as prized advisers in ancient and premodern civilizations such as the Assyrians, they lost respect and reverence during the Age of Enlightenment in the 17th and 18th centuries.

With the rise of commercialism, "the sale of occult practices [adapted to survive] in the larger society," according to sociologists Danny L. and Lin Jorgensen. Ken Feingold, writer of "Interactive Art as Divination as a Vending Machine," stated that with the invention of money, fortune telling became "a private service, a commodity within the marketplace".

As J. Peder Zane wrote in The New York Times in 1994, referring to the Psychic Friends Network, "Whether it's 3 P.M. or 3 A.M., there's Dionne Warwick and her psychic friends selling advice on love, money and success. In a nation where the power of crystals and the likelihood that angels hover nearby prompt more contemplation than ridicule, it may not be surprising that one million people a year call Ms. Warwick's friends."

=== Clientele ===
In 1994, the psychic counsellor Rosanna Rogers of Cleveland, Ohio, explained to J. Peder Zane that a wide variety of people consulted her: "Couch potatoes aren't the only people seeking the counsel of psychics and astrologers. Clairvoyants have a booming business advising Philadelphia bankers, Hollywood lawyers and CEO's of Fortune 500 companies... If people knew how many people, especially the very rich and powerful ones, went to psychics, their jaws would drop through the floor." Rogers "claims to have 4,000 names in her rolodex."

Janet Lee, also known as the Greenwich psychic, claims that her clientele often included Wall Street brokers who were looking for any advantage they could get. Her usual fee was around $150 for a session but some clients would pay between $2,000 and $9,000 per month to have her available 24 hours a day to consult.

=== Typical clients ===
In 1982, Danny Jorgensen, a professor of Religious Studies at the University of South Florida offered a spiritual explanation for the popularity of fortune telling. He said that people visit psychics or fortune tellers to gain self-understanding, and knowledge which will lead to personal power or success in some aspect of life.

In 1995, Ken Feingold offered a different explanation for why people seek out fortune tellers:

We desire to know other people's actions and to resolve our own conflicts regarding decisions to be made and our participation in social groups and economies. ... Divination seems to have emerged from our knowing the inevitability of death. The idea is clear—we know that our time is limited and that we want things in our lives to happen in accord with our wishes. Realizing that our wishes have little power, we have sought technologies for gaining knowledge of the future... gain power over our own [lives].

Ultimately, the reasons a person consults a diviner or fortune teller depend on cultural and personal expectations.

=== Services ===
Traditional fortune tellers vary in methodology, generally using techniques long established in their cultures and thus meeting the cultural expectations of their clientele.

In the United States and Canada, among clients of European ancestry, palmistry is popular and, as with astrology and tarot card reading, advice is generally given about specific problems besetting the client.

Non-religious spiritual guidance may also be offered. Catherine Adams, an American who claims to be clairvoyant. has written, "My philosophy is to teach and practice spiritual freedom, which means you have your own spiritual guidance, which I can help you get in touch with."

In the African American community, where many people practice a form of folk magic called hoodoo or rootworking, a fortune-telling session or "reading" for a client may be followed by practical guidance in spell-casting and Christian prayer, through a process called "magical coaching".

In addition to sharing and explaining their visions, fortune tellers can also act like counselors by discussing and offering advice about their clients' problems. They want their clients to exercise their own willpower.

=== Full-time careers ===
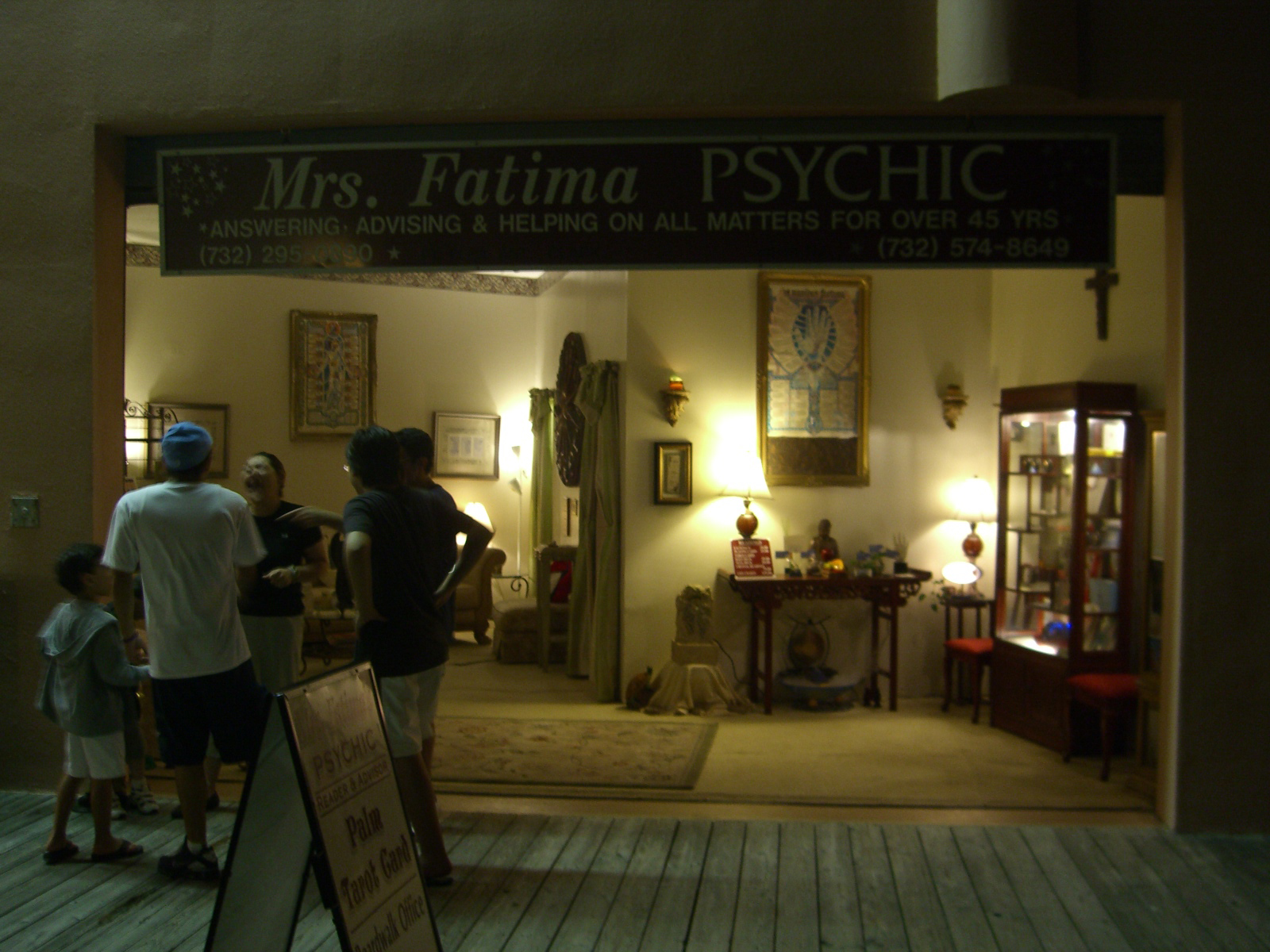
A fortune-telling storefront on the boardwalk in Point Pleasant Beach, New Jersey

Some fortune tellers support themselves entirely on their divination business; others hold down one or more jobs, and their second jobs may or may not relate to the occupation of divining. In 1982, Danny L., and Lin Jorgensen found that "while there is considerable variation among [these secondary] occupations, [part-time fortune tellers] are over-represented in human service fields: counseling, social work, teaching, health care." The same authors, making a limited survey of North American diviners, found that the majority of fortune tellers are married with children, and a few claim graduate degrees. "They attend movies, watch television, work at regular jobs, shop at K-Mart, sometimes eat at McDonald's, and go to the hospital when they are seriously ill."

== Legality ==
Witchcraft-related laws by country: Practice of magic is illegal Using witchcraft against another person is illegal Accusing someone of being a witch is illegal Pretending to be a witch and accusing someone of being a witch is illegal Practice of fortune-telling is illegal Law repealed

In 1982, the sociologists Danny L., and Lin Jorgensen found that, "when it is reasonable, [fortune tellers] comply with local laws and purchase a business license." However, in the United States, a variety of local and state laws restrict fortune telling, require the licensing or bonding of fortune tellers, or make necessary the use of terminology that avoids the term "fortune teller" in favor of terms such as "spiritual advisor" or "psychic consultant." There are also laws that outright forbid the practice in certain districts.

For instance, fortune telling is a class B misdemeanor in the state of New York. Under New York State law, S 165.35:

A person is guilty of fortune telling when, for a fee or compensation which he directly or indirectly solicits or receives, he claims or pretends to tell fortunes, or holds himself out as being able, by claimed or pretended use of occult powers, to answer questions or give advice on personal matters or to exercise, influence or affect evil spirits or curses; except that this section does not apply to a person who engages in the aforedescribed conduct as part of a show or exhibition solely for the purpose of entertainment or amusement.

Lawmakers who wrote this statute acknowledged that fortune tellers do not restrict themselves to "a show or exhibition solely for the purpose of entertainment or amusement" and that people will continue to seek out fortune tellers even though fortune tellers operate in violation of the law. In the states of Minnesota, North Carolina, Oklahoma, Pennsylvania, and Wisconsin, all forms of fortune-telling are illegal.

In Australia, fortune-telling is illegal in South Australia and the Northern Territory.

Saudi Arabia also bans the practice outright, considering fortune telling to be sorcery and thus contrary to Islamic teaching and Shariah jurisprudence. It has been punishable by death.

In the UK, the Fraudulent Mediums Act 1951 prohibited a person from claiming to be a fortune teller in order to make money for another reason than the purpose of entertainment. This act was repealed in 2008 and replaced by Consumer Protection from Unfair Trading Regulations 2008.

== Critical analysis ==
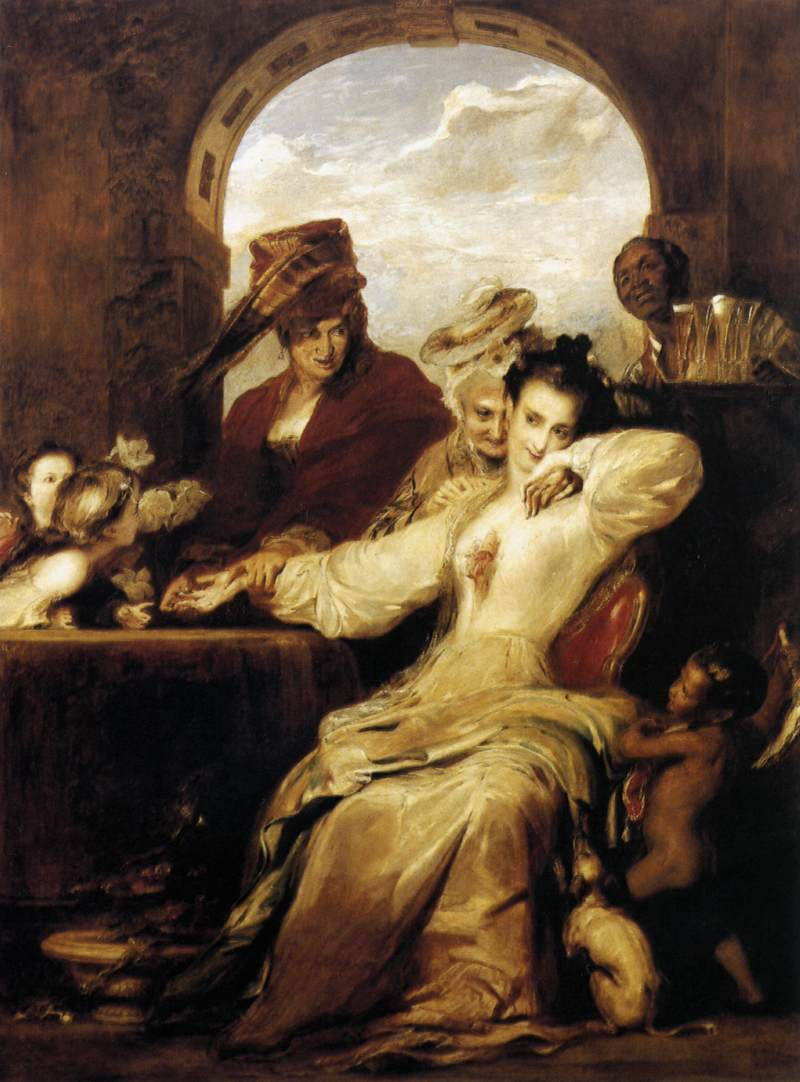
Josephine and the Fortune-Teller by David Wilkie, 1837

Fortune telling is easily dismissed by critics as magical thinking and superstition.

Skeptic Bergen Evans suggested that fortune telling is the result of a "naïve selection of something that have happened from a mass of things that haven't, the clever interpretation of ambiguities, or a brazen announcement of the inevitable." Other skeptics claim that fortune telling is nothing more than cold reading.

A large amount of fraud has been proven in the practice of fortune telling.

Fortune telling and how it works raises many critical questions. For example, fortune-telling occurs through various methods such as psychic readings and tarot cards. Similarly, these methods are largely based on random phenomena. For example, astrologers believe that the movement of stars in the sky can have implications on one's life. In the case of tarot cards, people believe that images displayed on the cards have significant meanings on their lives. However, there is a lack of evidence to support why such things, such as the stars, would have any implications on our lives.

Additionally, fortune-telling readings and predictions made by horoscopes, for example, are often general enough to apply to anyone. In cold reading, for example, readers often begin by stating general descriptions and continuing to make specifics based on the reactions they receive from the person whose life they are predicting. The tendency for people to deem general descriptions as being representative to themselves has been termed the Barnum effect and has been studied by psychologists for many years.

Nonetheless, even with a lack of evidence supporting the various methods of fortune-telling and the many frauds that have occurred by psychic readers, amongst others, fortune-telling continues to become popular around the world. There are many reasons for the appealing nature of fortune-telling such as that people often experience stress when there is uncertainty and thus seek to gain deeper insight into their lives.

== See also ==
- Chinese fortune telling
- Chinese spiritual world concepts
- Divination
- Divination in African traditional religion
- Flim-Flam! Psychics, ESP, Unicorns and other Delusions
- Fortune teller machine
- Kumari
- Ka-Bala board game
- Houdini's debunking spiritualists
- I Ching divination
- Bob Nygaard (psychic investigator)
- Peter Popoff investigated by James Randi
- Prophecy
- Psychic Blues: Confessions of a Conflicted Medium
- Rose Mackenberg (American investigator of psychic mediums)
- Tengenjutsu (fortune telling)
