= Song of the Arkafina =

Novel series by Suzanne Francis

Song of the Arkafina is a four volume work of fantasy by English author Suzanne Francis. The books were published in Ebook format in 2007-2008 by Mushroom Publishing and later in paperback by Bladud Books.

== Description ==
The books tell the life story of Katrione Estelle du Chesne. Heart of Hythea begins with her childhood and career as an apprentice healer of the Unity of Lalluna. The books are set in an imaginary sphere called Yrth that is ruled by a race of immortals called the Amaranthine. Katrione, her daughter Gwenn Faircrow, and granddaughter Myriadne Svalbarad play key roles, in the battle between the Amaranthine and their enemies, the Dark Angellus, which continues through all four books.

Song of the Arkafina comprises the following four books:

Volume One--Heart of Hythea
Volume Two--Ketha's Daughter
Volume Three--Dawnmaid
Volume Four--Beyond the Gyre

== The Divinatory Systems ==
Each book in Song of the Arkafina features one of four imaginary fortune-telling system devised by the author. The characters in Heart of Hythea use the Luckcast, a deck of 60 cards divided into three estates. In Ketha's Daughter, the seafaring race called the Fynara call on the Linnun, a series of stones with images of water in its differing forms. The Firaithi, a traveling people, use the octahedral Triske Stones to practice lithomancy in Dawnmaid. In Beyond the Gyre, the Angellus, also known as the Irais, use tokens representing the leaves of different species of trees. These are called The Folium.
