= Hydromancy =

Method of divination using water

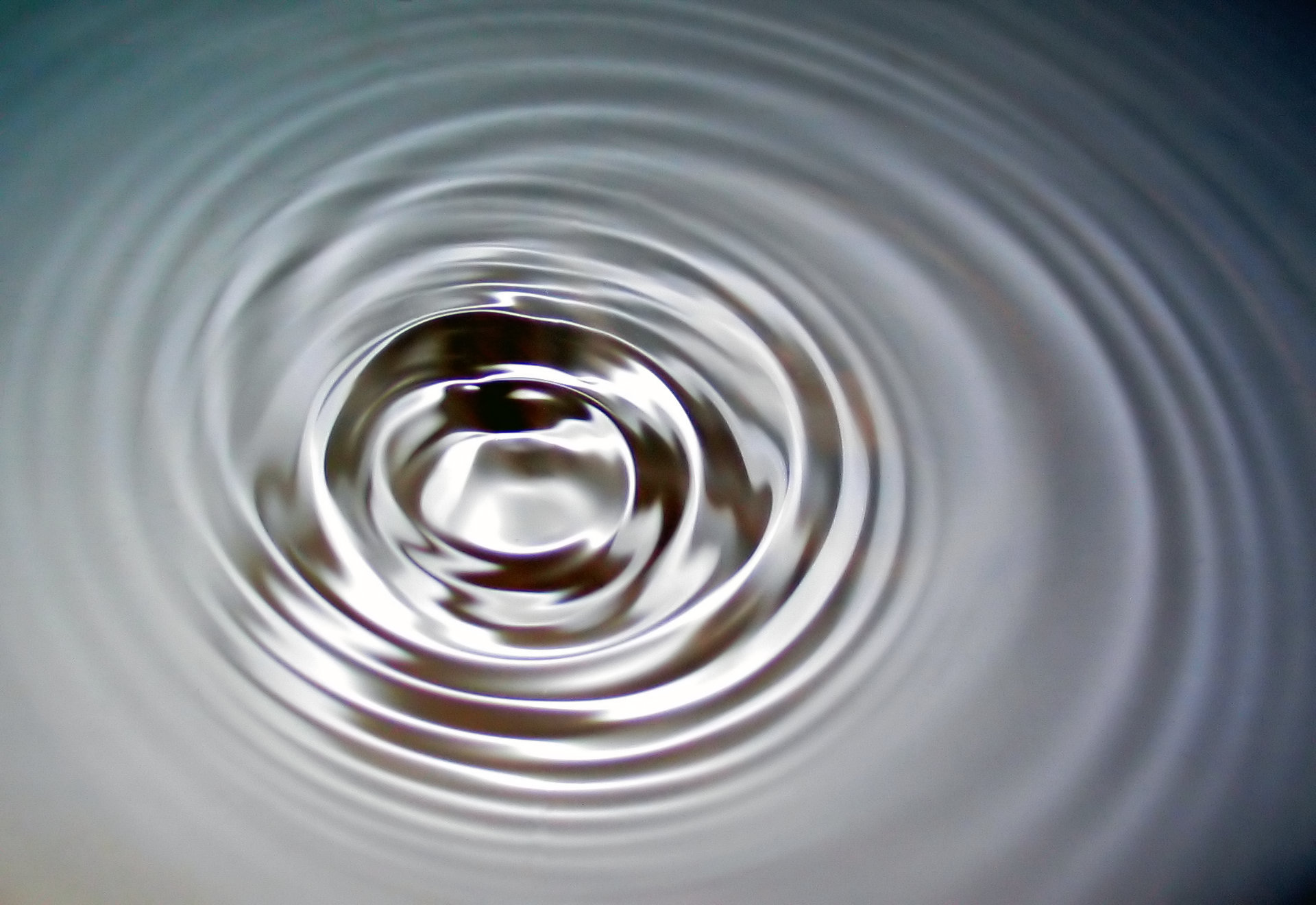
Hydromancy may interpret the color, ebb and flow, or ripples of perturbed water

Hydromancy (Ancient Greek ὑδρομαντεία, water-divination, from ὕδωρ, water, and μαντεία, divination) is a method of divination by means of water, including the color, ebb and flow, or ripples produced by pebbles dropped in a pool. It also refers to the entering of a trance by staring at a chosen form of water, which is a form of scrying.

== Methods of hydromancy ==
There are various methods of hydromancy. Hydromancy with rain water was termed "hydatoscopy", and hydromancy with water from a spring was termed "pegomancy".

The Jesuit M. A. Del Rio (1551–1608) described several methods of hydromancy. The first method described depicts a ring hanging by a string that is dipped into a vessel of water which was shaken. A judgment or prediction is made by the number of times which the ring strikes the sides of the vessel.

A second method is when three pebbles are thrown into standing water, and observations are made from the circles that are formed when the objects strike the water.

The third method described depended upon the agitation of the water. This custom was prevalent among Oriental Christians, who annually baptized in that element.

A fourth method used colors of the water and figures appearing in it. Varro stated that many prognostications were made in this way concerning the Mithridatic War. This branch of the divination proved so important that it was given a separate name, and there arose from it the divination of fountains whose waters were frequently visited.

Pausanias (2nd century CE) described the fountain near Epidaurus which was dedicated to the goddess Ino, into which loaves were thrown by worshippers who hoped to receive an oracle from the goddess. If the loaves were accepted, then they sank in the water, which meant good fortune, but if the loaves were washed up from the fountain, it meant bad luck.

A custom of ancient Germanic tribes was to throw newborn children into the Rhine river. It was thought that if the child was illegitimate, then he would drown, but if he was legitimate, he would swim. Such a custom appears to be a precursor of the 17th century custom of "swimming witches" perhaps related to the Anglo-Saxon law of trial by water.

In a fifth method of hydromancy, mysterious words are pronounced over a glass of water, and then observations are made of its spontaneous ebullience.

In the sixth method, a drop of oil was let drop into a vessel of water. This created a mirror through which wondrous things became visible. This, Del Rio said, is the Modus Fessanus.

The seventh method of hydromancy was cited by Clemens Alexandrinus, who cited that women of Germany watched the whirls and courses of rivers for prognostic interpretations. That same fact was mentioned by J. L. Vives in his Commentary upon St. Augustine.

Another method (and possibly the simplest) is via "scrying" (the entering into a trance as stimulated by staring at water in a bowl or some running form).

In Renaissance magic, hydromancy was classified as one of the seven "forbidden arts", along with necromancy, geomancy, aeromancy, pyromancy, chiromancy (palmistry), and spatulamancy (scapulimancy).

== See also ==
- Crystal gazing – Method for seeing visions by gazing at a crystal
- Lecanomancy – Form of divination using a dish, usually holding water
- Psychomanteum – Structure for communicating with the dead
- Scyphomancy – Divination using a cup or goblet
- Fluidics – Use of a fluid to perform analog or digital operations
