= Lecanomancy =

Form of divination using a dish, usually holding water

Lecanomancy (Gr. λεκάνη, "dish, pan" + μαντεία, "divination") is a form of divination using a dish, usually of water, which, like many ancient forms of divination, has multiple forms.

The earliest form of lecanomancy appears to have come from Ancient Babylonia, though it is only mentioned in one text. Even there, there were two types of the divination used. Some court magicians would use inductive lecanomancy; whereby the magician or priest would observe patterns of oil within water to predict the future. However, intuitive lecanomancy is thought to have developed out of this, which merely required the magician to interpret ripples on the water through meditation.

There are also reports of inductive lecanomancy being used by the Mesopotamians, though they sometimes substituted flour for oil.

In the Old Testament a form of lecanomancy was apparently used by Joseph in Egypt (Genesis 44:5,"Isn’t this the cup my master drinks from and also uses for divination? This is a wicked thing you have done.’”)

The Catawba people used an entirely different system of divination, which is still classified as lecanomancy, whereby a bowl of water was placed by a deceased person's head. On the third day of the bowl being present, the deceased's family would watch the bowl for ripples and these would be interpreted to determine the whereabouts of the deceased's soul.

In medieval Europe, lecanomancy was described as clear glass bowls being filled with water to determine the future. This is in stark contrast with earlier forms of the divination, which used clay bowls or basins.

Other forms of lecanomancy throughout history involved dropping a rock in water and interpreting the ripples in the water. In yet another form, demons were thought to enter the water whose ripples were being interpreted, and were forced to answer questions by the scryer.

== British and Irish Traditions ==
Lecanomancy is attested as a tradition in Britain and Ireland from at least the 18th century. The practice usually involved the use of three plates, filled with different substances, into which one had to place one's hand blindfolded. Frequently, it was used at Halloween gatherings to predict an individual's marital outcomes, though sources also attest to a range of different purposes and procedures, as described below.

It is notably mentioned in the 1785 poem "Halloween" by Scottish poem Robert Burns. In the notes to the poem, Burns explained:

Take three dishes; put clean water in one, foul water in another, leave the third empty: blindfold a person, and lead him to the hearth where the dishes are ranged: he (or she) dips the left hand: if by chance in the clean water, the future husband or wife will come to the bar of matrimony, a maid: if in the foul, a window: if in the empty dish, it foretells, with equal certainty, not marriage at all. It is repeated three times; and every time the arrangement of the dishes is altered.

Hence, in the penultimate verse of the poem, Burns writes:

In order, on the clean hearth-stane,
The luggies [small wooden dishes] three are ranged;
And ev'ry time great care is taen,
To see them duly changed:
Auld uncle John, wha [who] wedlock's joys
Sin [since] Mar's-year [1715] did desire,
Because he gat the toom [empty] dish thrice,
He heav'd them on the fire
In wrath that night.

In his 1848 The Autobiography of a Working Man, Scottish writer Alexander Somerville reports witnessing the same practice on Halloween. Likewise, in a 1911 book, folklorist J. C. Davies reported having once seen an identical practice in Cardiganshire, Wales, though without, apparently, the same link to Halloween.

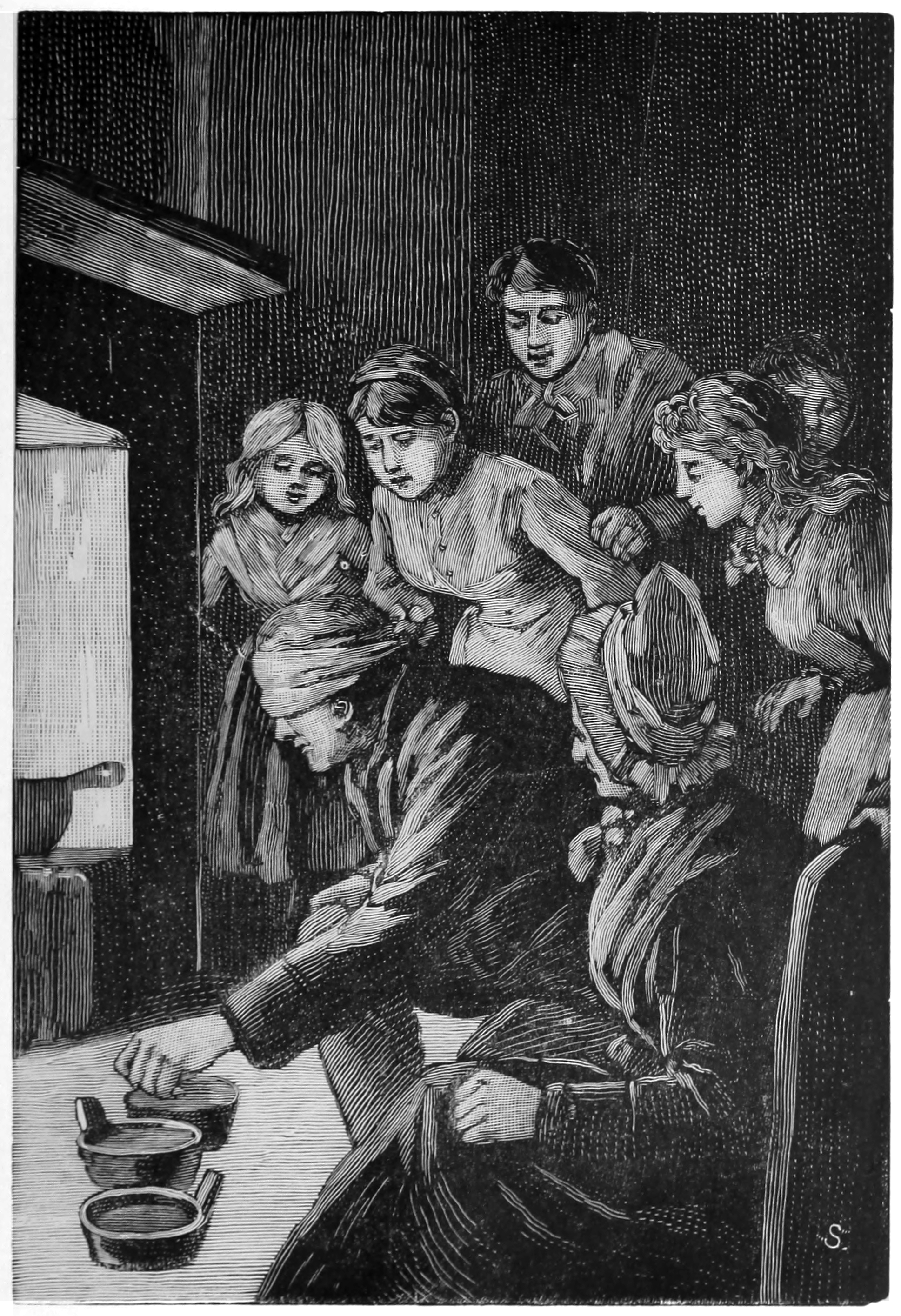
Illustration from The Poetical Works of Robert Burns in which Uncle John places his hand in the empty dish on Halloween night, auguring yet another year without finding a wife.

Meanwhile, a source from Ireland in 1865 shows how the practice was sometimes used for other purposes than divining marriage prospects. On Halloween, it is explained, three dishes were placed out, "one [containing] water, another earth, and the third meal." Anyone who, blind-folded, touches the water-filled dish will live for at least another year longer; anyone who touches the soil-filled dish will die before the end of the year; and anyone who touches the meal-filled dish will one day become wealthy.

19th-century folklorist Thomas Wilkie reports that a form of lecanomancy with three dishes, called "Dishaloof," was used as part of an elaborate funeral rite in the Scottish Lowlands whereby three empty dishes are placed on the hearth with a sieve placed between them; the attendants would leave the room, return backwards, and attempt to place their hands on the sieve; if no one did so, then it "augurs ill for the departed [soul]."

== See also ==
- Hydromancy – Method of divination using water
- Psychomanteum – Structure for communicating with the dead
- Scyphomancy – Divination using a cup or goblet
