= Gastromancy =

Gastromancy comes from the Ancient Greek words γαστήρ (gastḗr, "stomach") and μαντεία (manteía, "divination"). It may refer to:

- Ventriloquism, originally divination by interpreting stomach sounds
- Crystal gazing, divination by gazing into a crystal
