= Ron Bodoh =

American craftsman and carver of quartz crystal balls

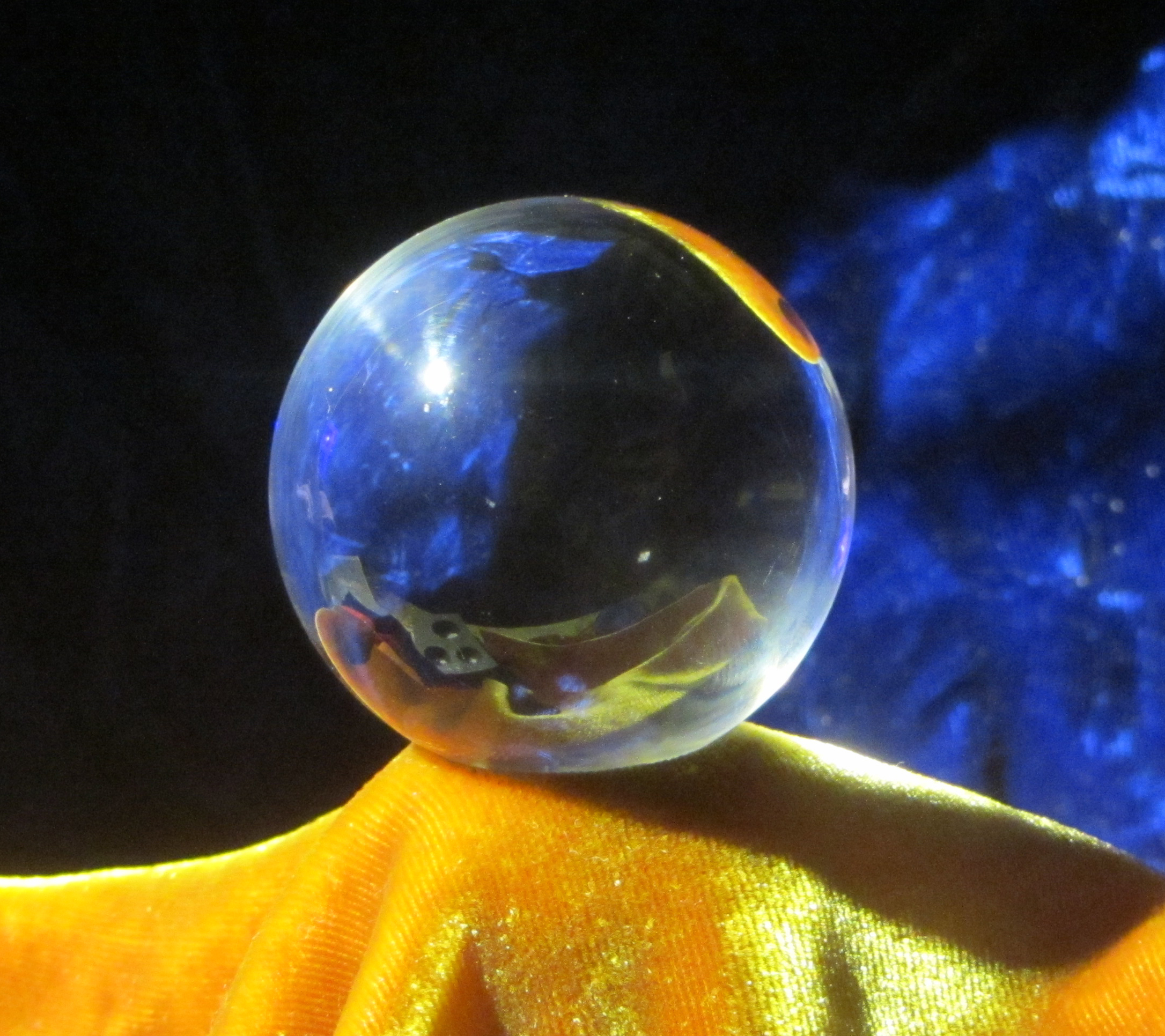
Flawless quartz crystal ball measuring 45 mm in diameter and weighing 130 grams. Carved by Ron Bodoh

Ronald Bodoh (August 20, 1953 - September 26, 2015) was a master American craftsman and carver of flawless quartz crystal balls. He began producing the spheres in 1971, and had made 40 by 1974.

In 1974, he appeared in an episode of "To Tell the Truth" hosted by Gary Moore. Bodoh was sitting in the #1 position. Peggy Cass and Orson Bean guessed correctly. Kitty Carlisle and Bill Cullen voted for struggling songwriter Christopher Glenn, who was #2. Claude Bigo, a student at Loyola, was #3.

In 1976, Bodoh created what was then the third largest flawless quartz crystal ball in the world; it weighed almost 15 pounds (6.8 kg) and sold for US$40,000 to a private collector
