= Suzanne Francis =

English writer

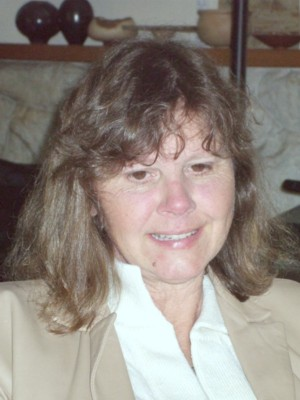
- Francis at Otago Writer's Guild Meeting, 2008
- Born: March 20, 1959 (age 67); King's Lynn, Norfolk, England
- Education: Jacksonville State University (B.S.)
- Occupation: Author
- Writing career
- Genre: Fantasy/Science Fiction
- Notable work: Song of the Arkafina

Suzanne Francis (March 20, 1959) is an English science fiction and fantasy author. She was born in King's Lynn, Norfolk, and now lives in Dunedin, New Zealand. She has been married twice and has four children.

Suzanne Francis is the author of four published novels, collectively known as the Song of the Arkafina. The books were first published as ebooks by Mushroom Ebooks in 2007–2009 and in paperback in 2009 by Bladud Books.

All the books in the Song of the Arkafina are set in an imaginary universe known as the Gyre. Ms. Francis has stated she intends to continue adding works to the Gyre Cosmos in the future. She has also completed a series entitled Sons of the Mariner, which follows the further events in the lives of the main characters from the Song of the Arkafina series. It has, as yet, only been published in an electronic format.

== Bibliography ==
=== Song of the Arkafina ===
- Heart of Hythea (2008) (ISBN 978-1-84319-641-9)
- Ketha's Daughter (2009) (ISBN 978-1-84319-809-3)
- Dawnmaid (2009)(ISBN 1843197847)
- Beyond the Gyre (2009) (ISBN 1843197898)

=== Sons of the Mariner ===
- Wintermoon Ice (2010) (ASIN B004I1KNYK)
- Summermoon Fire (2011) (ASIN B004NSVQ94)
