= Scrying =

Seeking visions in a reflective surface

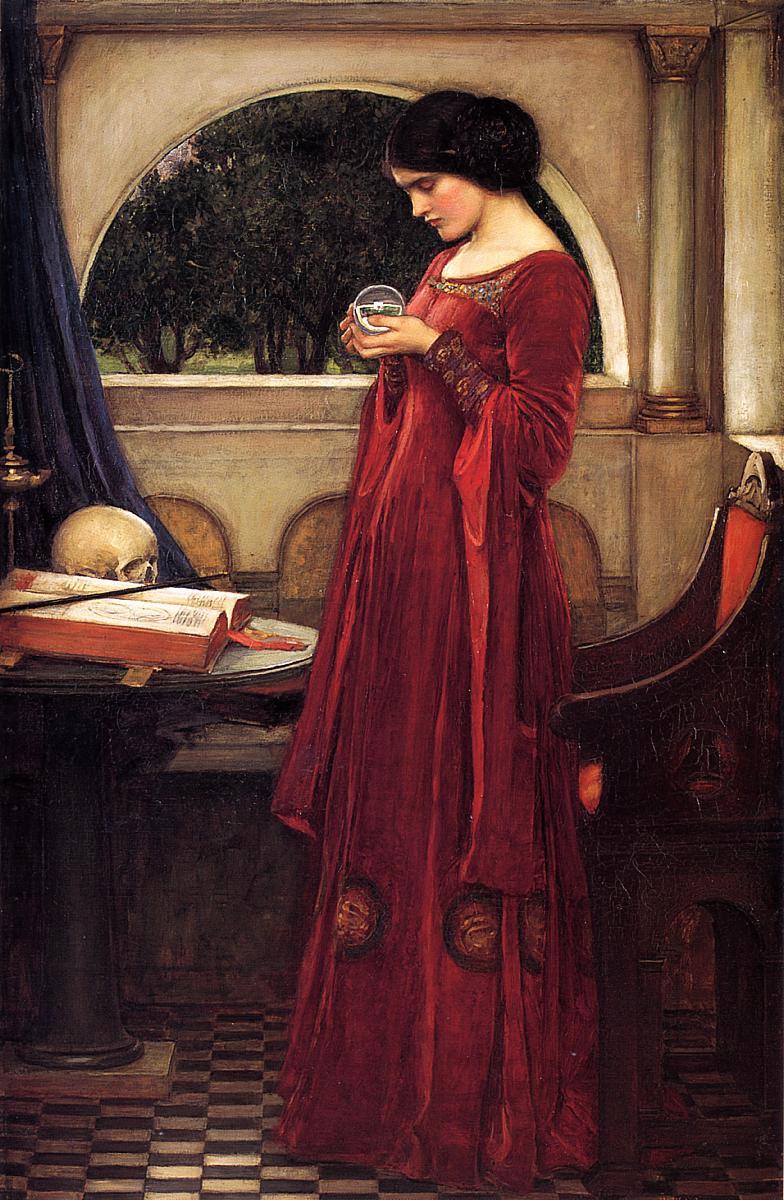
The Crystal Ball by John William Waterhouse (1902, oil on canvas)

Scrying, also referred to as "seeing" or "peeping", is a practice rooted in divination and fortune-telling. It involves gazing into a medium, hoping to receive significant messages or visions that could offer personal guidance, prophecy, revelation, or inspiration. The practice lacks a definitive distinction from other forms of clairvoyance or divination but generally relies on visions within the chosen medium. Unlike augury, which interprets observable events, or divination, which follows standardized rituals, scrying's impressions arise within the medium itself.

The terminology and methods of scrying are diverse and lack a standardized structure. Practitioners coin terms such as "crystallomancy", "spheromancy", or "catoptromancy", naming practices based on the medium or technique employed. These practices have been reinvented throughout history, spanning cultures and regions. Scrying media encompasses reflective, refractive, or luminescent surfaces like crystals, mirrors, water, fire, or smoke. Some practitioners even close their eyes, engaging in "eyelid scrying".

Methods of scrying often include self-induced trances, using media like crystal balls or even modern technology like smartphones. Practitioners enter a focused state that reduces mental clutter, enabling the emergence of visual images. These initial images, however trivial, are amplified during the trance. Some scryers report that they hear their voice affirming what they see, creating a mental feedback loop.

Throughout history, various traditions and cultures have practiced scrying as a means of revealing the past, present, or future. The practice involves diverse media, from reflective surfaces to shimmering mirages, and is often accompanied by rituals inducing altered states of consciousness. Despite its popularity in occult circles and its portrayal in media, scrying lacks empirical support and has been met with skepticism from the scientific community.

== Definitions and terminology ==
There is no definitive distinction between scrying and other aids to clairvoyance, augury, or divination, but roughly speaking, scrying depends on impressions of visions in the medium of choice. Ideally in this respect it differs from augury, which relies on interpretations of objectively observable objects or events (such as flight of birds); from divination, which depends on standardized processes or rituals; from oneiromancy, which depends on the interpretation of dreams; from the physiological effects of psychoactive drugs; and from clairvoyance, which notionally does not depend on objective sensory stimuli. Clairvoyance in other words, is regarded as amounting in essence to extrasensory perception.

Scrying is neither a single, clearly defined, nor formal discipline and there is no uniformity in the procedures, which repeatedly and independently have been reinvented or elaborated in many ages and regions. Furthermore, practitioners and writers coin terminology so arbitrarily, and often artificially, that no one system of nomenclature can be taken as authoritative and definitive. Commonly terms in use are Latinisations or Hellenisations of descriptions of the media or activities. Examples of names coined for crystal gazing include 'crystallomancy', 'spheromancy', and 'catoptromancy'. As an example of the looseness of such terms, catoptromancy should refer more specifically to scrying by use of mirrors or other reflective objects rather than by crystal gazing. Other names that have been coined for the use of various scrying media include anthracomancy for glowing coals, turifumy for scrying into smoke, and hydromancy for scrying into water. There is no clear limit to the coining and application of such terms and media.

Scrying has been practiced in many cultures in the belief that it can reveal the past, present, or future. Some practitioners assert that visions that come when one stares into the media are from the subconscious or imagination, while others say that they come from gods, spirits, devils, or the psychic mind, depending on the culture and practice. There is neither any systematic body of empirical support for any such views in general however, nor for their respective rival merits; individual preferences in such matters are arbitrary.

Alternatively the medium might reduce visual stimuli to thresholds below which any clear impressions could interfere with fancied visions or free association. Examples include darkened reflections of night sky, or plain shadow or darkness.

== Methods ==
One class of methods of scrying involves a self-induced trance, with or without the aid of a medium such as a crystal ball or, even via modern technology such as a smartphone among other things. Some say that the sensation is drug-like, some that various drugs can potentiate the experience; others categorically exclude any connection with drug usage, believing that it invalidates any images observed.

Many practitioners say that the scrying medium initially serves to focus attention, removing unwanted thoughts from the mind in much the same way as repetition of a mantra, concentration on a mandala, inducing the relaxation response, or possibly by hypnosis. Once this stage is achieved, the scryer may begin free association with the perceived images. The technique of deliberately looking for and declaring these initial images aloud, however trivial or irrelevant they may seem to the conscious mind, attempts to deepen the trance state. In this state some scryers hear their own disassociated voices affirming what they see, in a mental feedback loop.

Practitioners apply the process until they achieve a satisfactory state of perception in which rich visual images and dramatic stories seem to be projected within the medium itself, or in the mind's eye of the scryer. They report that the technique allows them to see relevant events or images within the chosen medium.

Nostradamus practiced scrying; he would stare into a bowl of water or a magic mirror to see the future while he was in trance.

== Religion and mythology ==
=== Hebrew Bible ===
Divination is briefly mentioned in chapter 44 of the Book of Genesis. A silver chalice or cup is deliberately planted in Benjamin's sack when he leaves Egypt, later to be used as evidence of theft. It is revealed the cup belongs to Joseph, the vizier of Egypt, whose steward said it was used for drinking and divination during the course of his accusation. This is mentioned to reinforce his disguise as an Egyptian nobleman.

=== Ancient Persia ===
The Shahnameh, a 10th-century epic work narrating historical and mythological past of Persia, gives a description of what was called the Cup of Jamshid (Jaam-e Jam), which was used by the ancient (mythological) Persian kings for observing all of the seven layers of the universe. The cup was said to contain an elixir of immortality, but without cogent explanation for any relevance of the elixir to the scrying function.

=== Latter Day Saint movement ===
In the late 1820s, Joseph Smith founded the Latter Day Saint movement based in part on insights gained from the reflections of seer stones. Smith had at least three separate stones which he used initially in treasure-hunting expeditions. Subsequently, he took to placing his favorite stone inside his hat to read what he said were miraculous reflections from the stone. Smith also said he possessed a pair of spectacles manufactured from seer stones, which he called the Urim and Thummim and which he said enabled him to translate the golden plates that are the stated source of the Book of Mormon.

== In folklore ==
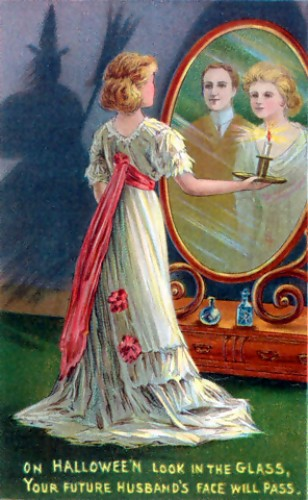
Divination rituals such as the one depicted on this early 20th-century Halloween greeting card, where a woman stares into a mirror in a darkened room to catch a glimpse of the face of her future husband while a witch lurks in the shadows, may be one origin of the Bloody Mary legend.

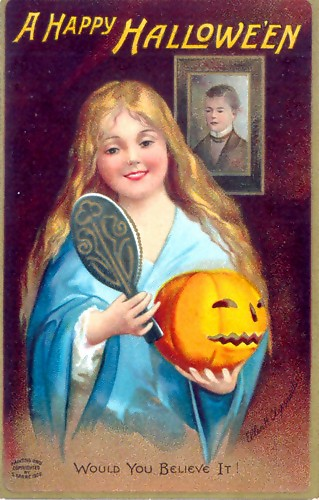
This Halloween greeting card from 1904 satirizes divination: the young woman hoping to see her future husband sees the reflection of a nearby portrait instead.

Rituals that involve many acts similar to scrying in ceremonial magic are retained in the form of folklore and superstition. A formerly widespread tradition held that young women gazing into a mirror in a darkened room (often on Halloween) could catch a glimpse of their future husband's face in the mirror — or a skull personifying Death if their fate was to die before they married.

Another form of the tale, involving the same actions of gazing into a mirror in a darkened room, is used as a supernatural dare in the tale of "Bloody Mary". Here, the motive is usually to test the adolescent gazers' mettle against a malevolent witch or ghost, in a ritual designed to allow the scryers' easy escape if the visions summoned prove too frightening.

Folklore superstitions such as those just mentioned, are not to be distinguished clearly from traditional tales, within which the reality of such media are taken for granted. In the fairytale of Snow White for example, the jealous queen consults a magic mirror, which she asks "Magic mirror on the wall / Who is the fairest of them all?", to which the mirror always replies "You, my queen, are fairest of all." But when Snow White reaches the age of seven, she becomes as beautiful as the day, and when the queen asks her mirror, it responds: "Queen, you are full fair, 'tis true, but Snow White is fairer than you." There is no uniformity among believers, in how seriously they prefer to take such tales and superstitions.

== In Western esotericism ==
The Hermetic Order of the Golden Dawn (1888-c.1902 in its original form) taught their own version of scrying that could be done individually or as a group. It emphasized three levels:

1. "Scrying in the Spirit Vision" with an emphasis on inner seeing by focusing on a symbol or mirror,
2. "Traveling in the Spirit Vision" involves going to the place seen and interacting with what is found there,
3. "Rising on the Planes" focuses on a spiritual process (involving scrying via the Tree of Life) that has the potential to elevate consciousness to the level of the Divine.

== Scientific reception ==
Scrying is not supported by science as a method of predicting the future or obtaining information unavailable to empirical investigation. Some critics consider it to be a pseudoscience. Skeptics consider scrying to be the result of delusion or wishful thinking.

Psychologist Leonard Zusne suggested that scrying images are hallucinations or hypnagogic experiences.

A 2010 paper in the journal Perception identified one specific method of reliably reproducing a scrying illusion in a mirror and hypothesized that it "might be caused by low level fluctuations in the stability of edges, shading and outlines affecting the perceived definition of the face, which gets over-interpreted as 'someone else' by the face recognition system."

== See also ==
- Chinese magic mirror
- John Dee
- Ganzfeld experiment
- Lecanomancy
- Macharomancy
- Melong
- Psychomanteum
- Remote viewing
- Renaissance magic
- Scyphomancy
- Sensory deprivation
- Time viewer
- Yard globe
