= Catoptromancy =

Divination using a mirror

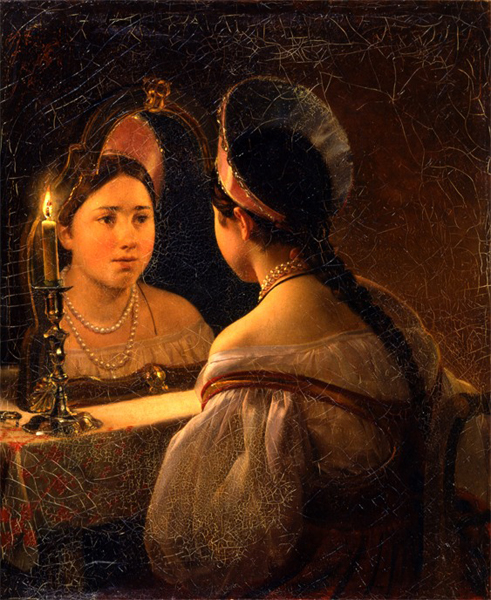
Russian folk catoptromancy by Karl Briullov, 1836

Catoptromancy (from Ancient Greek κάτοπτρον katoptron, "mirror," and μαντεία manteia, "divination"), also known as captromancy or enoptromancy, is divination using a mirror.

== History ==
=== Greece and Rome ===
Pausanias, an ancient Greek traveler, described the practice as follows:

Before the Temple of Ceres at Patras, there was a fountain, separated from the temple by a wall, and there was an oracle, very truthful, not for all events, but for the sick only. The sick person let down a mirror, suspended by a thread till its base touched the surface of the water, having first prayed to the goddess and offered incense. Then; looking into the mirror, he saw the presage of death or recovery, according as the face appeared fresh and healthy, or of a ghastly aspect.

In Ancient Rome, the priests who used catoptromancy were called specularii. They would use polished metal mirrors to gaze into the future and seek guidance from the gods. Catoptromancy was also popular in medieval Europe, and was practiced by pagans and Christians alike.

=== Egypt ===
The practice of catoptromancy is said to date back to the ancient Egyptians. They believed that mirrors could be used as portals guiding them into the afterlife, or used as a tool to see into the future. Mirrors have been found inside Egyptian burial tombs, and were used in ceremonial practices attempting to contact the dead. For example, a collection of funerary manuscripts known as the Book of the Dead describes a ritual in which a mirror could be used by the recently deceased to unite with their mortal soul by looking at their own reflection in the afterlife.

=== China ===
Catoptromancy was also practiced in ancient China. The Chinese believed that mirrors could be used to see into the soul and to predict the future. They would often use mirrors to perform rituals to cleanse the soul and to improve one's luck. For example, one popular ritual involved gazing into a mirror in a dark room and trying to see the reflection of one's future spouse.

=== India ===
Catoptromancy was also practiced in ancient India. The Indians believed that mirrors could be used to see into the past, present, and future. They would often use mirrors to perform rituals to gain knowledge and power. The Indian belief that mirrors could be used to see into the past, present, and future is supported by the fact that mirrors are often mentioned in Hindu mythology. For example, in the Mahābhārata, a Hindu epic poem, the hero Yudhishthira uses a mirror to see into the future and learn about his upcoming battle.

=== Persia ===
A 13th-century bronze mirror attributed to Iran or Central Asia. Cast-bronze mirrors of this type were sometimes used for divination or magical medicine.

Mirror divination is attested in Iranian divinatory practice and folklore under the Persian term āʾīna-bīnī (Persian: آینه‌بینی, romanized: āʾīna-bīnī, lit. 'mirror divination'). It has been used in attempts to obtain information about hidden matters, locate missing persons, or interpret images believed to appear in a mirror. In accounts of Persian divination, mirror divination is listed alongside practices involving books, cards, chickpeas, lamps, and other media.

A documented practice from Gilan involved a ritual known as eḥżār-e āʾīna (Persian: احضار آینه, romanized: eḥżār-e āʾīna, lit. 'summoning of the mirror'). A prepubescent child was placed before a mirror and asked to describe the images appearing in it, sometimes in an attempt to locate a missing person. Similar practices involving reflections in mirrors or water were also used in rituals intended to identify the supposed supernatural cause of an illness. In such cases, an image seen in the reflection could be interpreted as revealing a spirit believed to be responsible for the affliction.

Mirrors also formed part of the equipment used by some professional charm-writers and fortune-tellers in Iran. Their implements could include inscribed brass bowls, astrolabe-like objects, several mirrors, colored crystal balls, and knotted cords. Some practitioners also employed children as mediums in attempts to identify missing persons or individuals believed to have committed a crime.

== Use in early Europe ==
A French book named La catoptromancie grecque et ses dérivés ("Greek catoptromancy and its derivatives") by Armand Delatte from 1932 details the history of catoptromancy in the context of early European history.

Delatte wrote that, in the Middle Ages, mentions of the divinatory mirror appear, "obscure and also uncertain", in the canon of an Irish council "whose convocation is reported by tradition". Historical criticism shows that the collection of these texts cannot go back further than the beginning of the 6th[-]^{[sic]}11th century, although certain canons can claim to a more remote antiquity. Here is an example:

I translate literally: 'the Christian, it is said, who believes that there is a witch (lamia or striga) in a mirror, will be anathema, anyone who launches this [nsult against a person; and he cannot be received into the church before having personally retracted the accusation he has made and thus having done penance with all desirable zeal'. (Note: The lesson [...] which offers no acceptable meaning, was corrected in speculation around 1630 by Spelman, in his collection of the texts of the Councils; this correction was taken up by Labbe in 1671 and Wilkins in 1736. The canon is linked to the efforts made, from the 7th to the 11th century, by the Church and the secular power to destroy the belief in witches (sttigae, mascae).) The absence of connection, in the first sentence, between the two relative clauses, as well as the mention of a single measure of reparation and penance, which consists of the retraction of an insult, clearly shows, despite the clumsiness of the editorial, that we cannot dissociate the two faults referred to in this canon: it is the same person who claims to see a witch in a mirror and who, in relation to this first error (as shown by the words this insult), launches against others an accusation of witchcraft. To express our thoughts clearly, sin consists, according to us, of trying to recognize a witch with the help of a magic mirror. Certain modern superstitions and customs can be cited in support of this interpretation. In Thuringia, in Scotland and in the country of Cornwall, we encountered, not long ago, diviners who had the power to make witches and evil people appear, either in an ordinary mirror or in a mirror specially consecrated by magical rites, as well as the author of a theft or any other secret thing. Frazer reports, according to Miss Gordon Cumming, that a family of Nairn in Scotland possessed in the last century 'a crystal ball which, immersed in a bucket of water, becomes a magic mirror reflecting the face of the evil neighbor who bewitched the cattle'. Here we encounter for the first time an example of those combinations of lecanomancy with crystallomancy or catoptromancy to which I alluded previously. The text of the Irish canon therefore seems to me to target a particular use of divination by the mirror, one of those which was considered more dangerous by the Church of the first centuries, because it favored belief in magic.

== In popular culture ==
- The Magic Mirror in "Snow White" by the Brothers Grimm
- War and Peace by Leo Tolstoy
- Mordant's Need by Stephen R. Donaldson
- The mirror segment of the 1945 British supernatural horror film Dead of Night
- The Mirror of Erised in Harry Potter and the Philosopher's Stone

== See also ==
- Crystal gazing
- Mirrors in Mesoamerican culture
- Mirrors in Shinto
- Psychomanteum
- Scrying
