= Crystal ball =

Fortune-telling object

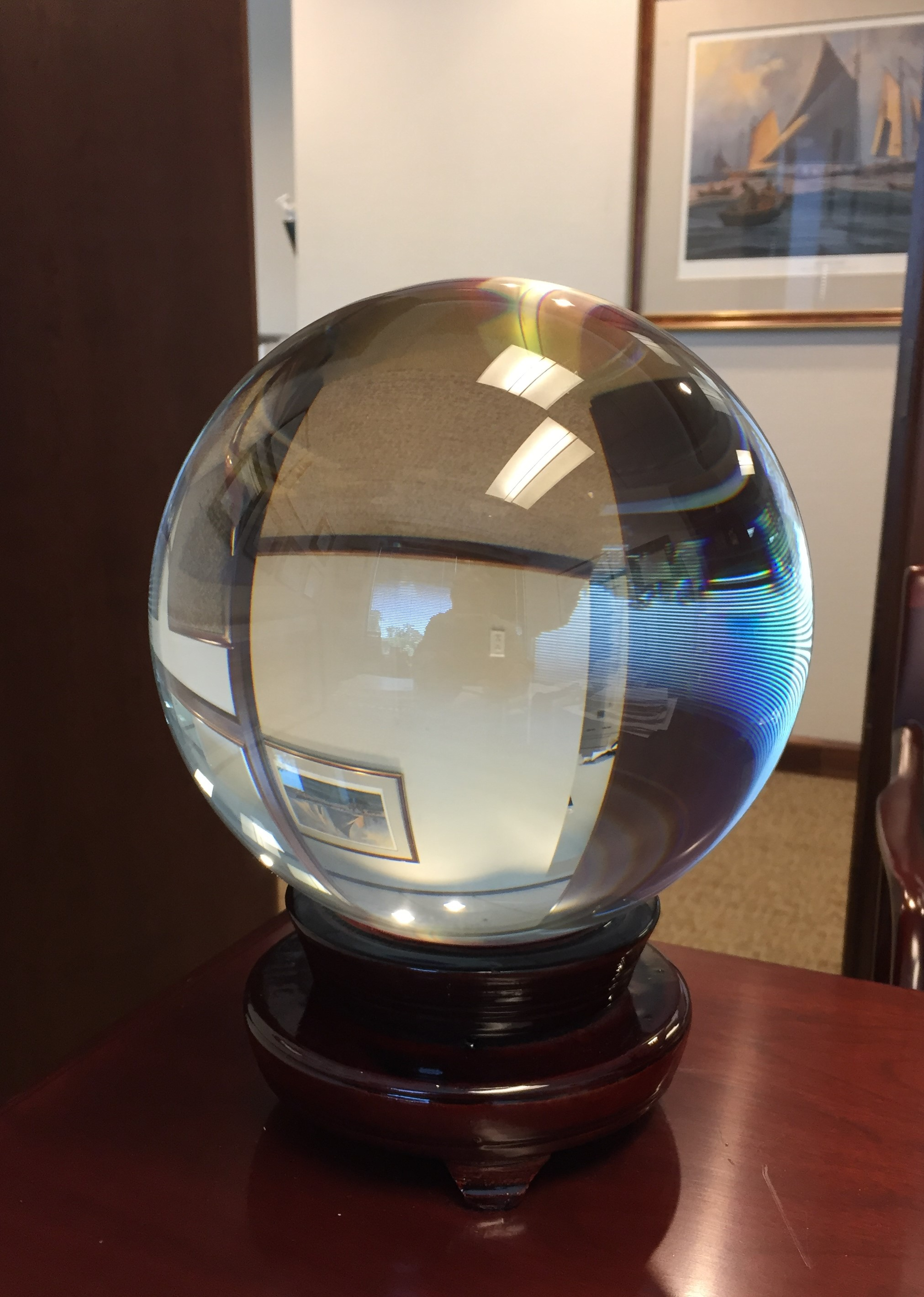
A quartz crystal ball of the type commonly used for divination or scrying

A crystal ball is a crystal or glass ball commonly used in the practice of crystal gazing and fortune-telling associated with clairvoyance and scrying. Crystal balls have been used since antiquity and have had a broad reputation with witchcraft and charlatan acts at circus venues and festivals. Other names for the object include crystal sphere, orbuculum, scrying ball, shew/show(ing) stone, and more variants by dialect.

== History ==
By the fifth century AD, scrying using crystal balls was widespread within the Roman Empire and was condemned by the early Christian Church as heretical (magic had been condemned since the Apostolic Era with e.g. Chapter 2 of the Didache).

The tomb of Childeric I, a fifth-century king of the Franks, contained a 3.8 cm (1½ inch) diameter transparent beryl globe. The object is similar to other globes that were later found in tombs from the Merovingian period in Gaul and the Saxon period in England. Some of these were complete with a frame suggesting an ornamental object. It has been pointed out that these mounts are identical to those of later globes also believed to be used for magic or divination, indicating that these crystal globes may have been used for crystallomancy.

John Dee was a noted British mathematician, astronomer, astrologer, geographer, and consultant to Queen Elizabeth I. He devoted much of his life to alchemy, divination, and Hermetic philosophy, of which the use of crystal balls was often included.

Crystal gazing was a popular pastime in the Victorian era, and was claimed to work best when the Sun is at its northernmost declination. Immediately before the appearance of a vision, the ball was said to mist up from within.

The use of crystal balls for divination also has a long history with the Romani people. Fortune-tellers, known as drabardi, traditionally use crystal balls as well as cards to seek knowledge about future events.

== Scrying ==
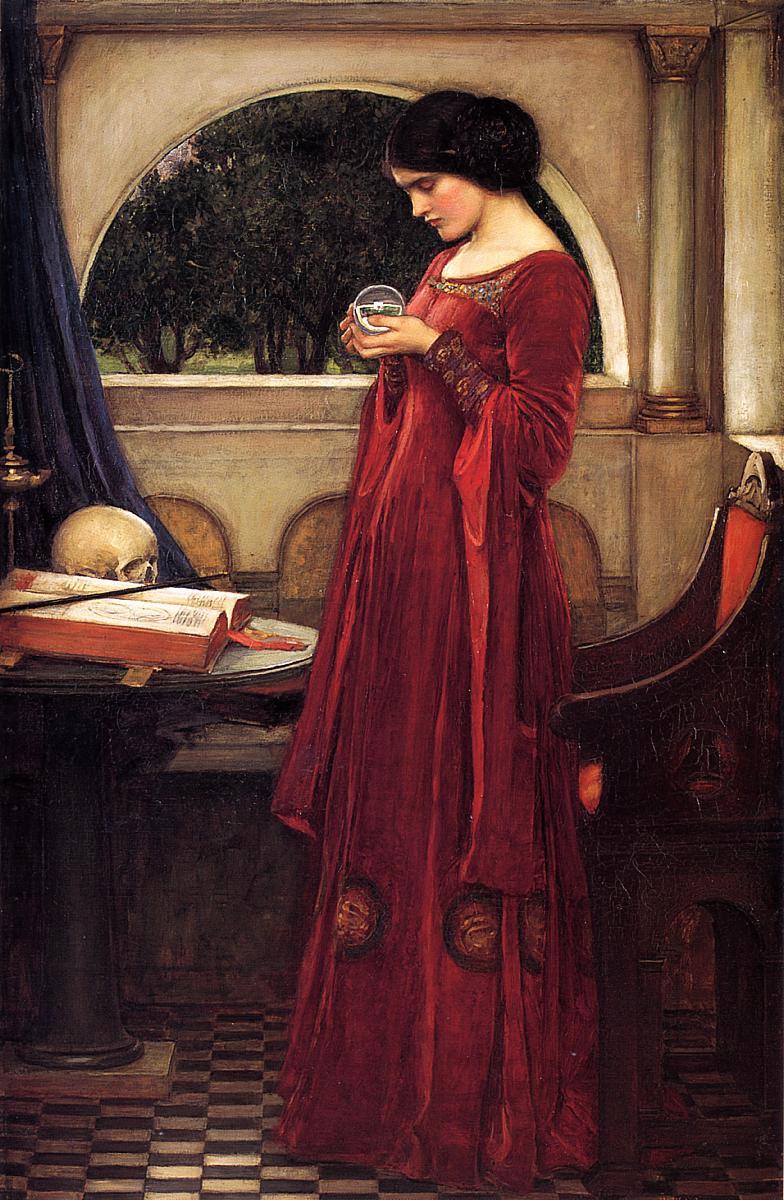
The Crystal Ball by John William Waterhouse (1902)

The process of scrying often involves the use of crystals, especially crystal balls, in an attempt to predict the future or otherwise divine hidden information. Crystal ball scrying is commonly used to seek supernatural guidance while making difficult decisions in one's life (e.g., matters of love or finances).

When the technique of scrying is used with crystals, or any transparent body, it is known as crystallomancy or crystal gazing.

== In stage magic ==
Crystal balls are popular props used in mentalism acts by stage magicians. Such routines, in which the performer answers audience questions by means of various ruses, are known as crystal gazing acts. One of the most famous performers of the 20th century, Claude Alexander, was often billed as "Alexander the Crystal Seer".

== Optics ==
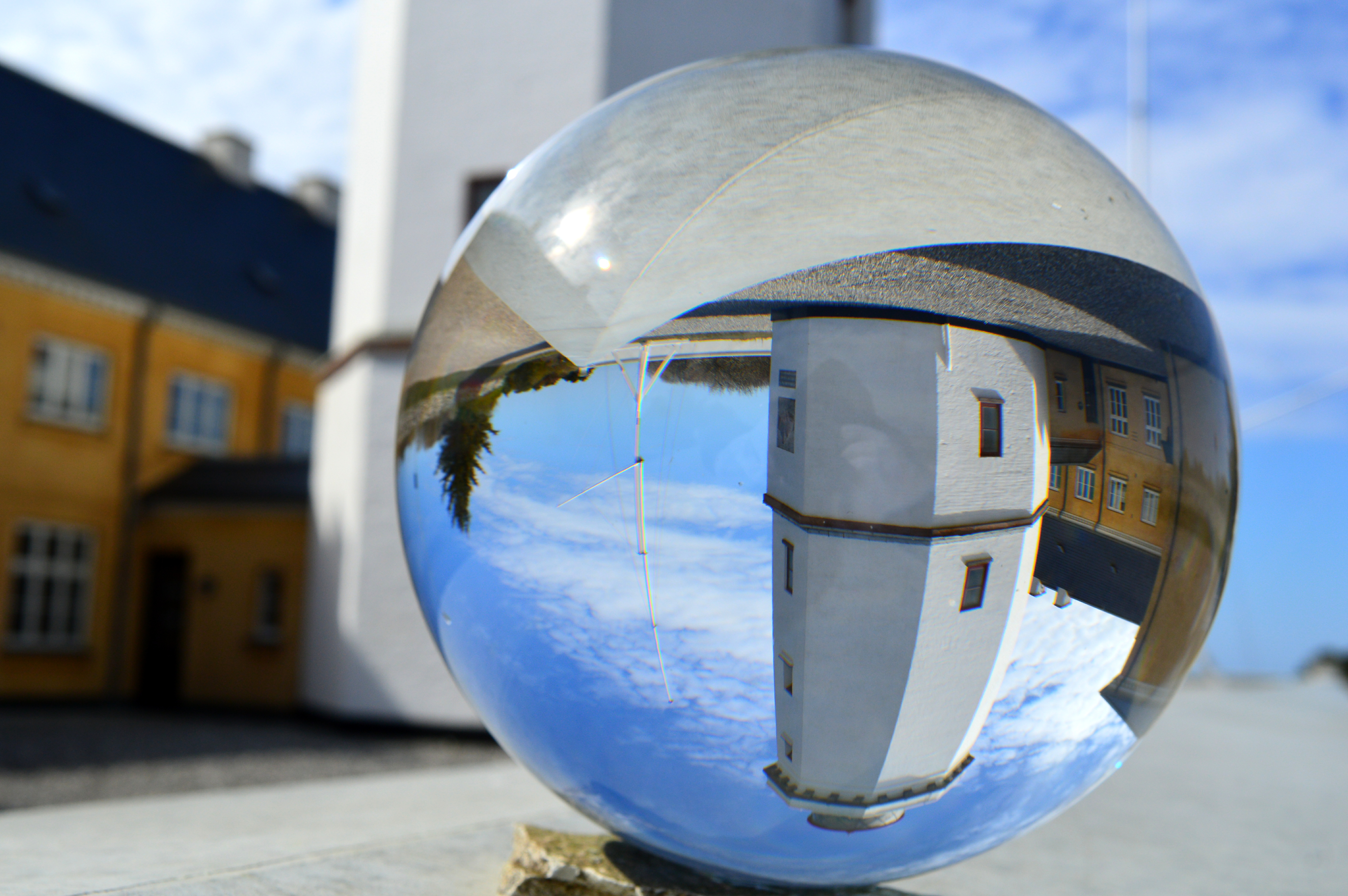
Hanstholm lighthouse in Denmark through lens ball

Optically, a crystal ball is a ball lens. For typical materials such as quartz and glass, it forms an image of distant objects slightly beyond the surface of the sphere, on the opposite side. Unlike conventional lenses, the image-forming properties are omnidirectional (independent of the direction being imaged)

This omnidirectional focusing can cause a crystal ball to act as a burning glass when it is brought into full sunlight. The image of the sun formed by a large crystal ball will burn a hand that is holding it, and can ignite dark-coloured flammable material placed near it. This effect is used by the Campbell–Stokes recorder to form a record of hours of sunshine.

== Famous crystal balls ==
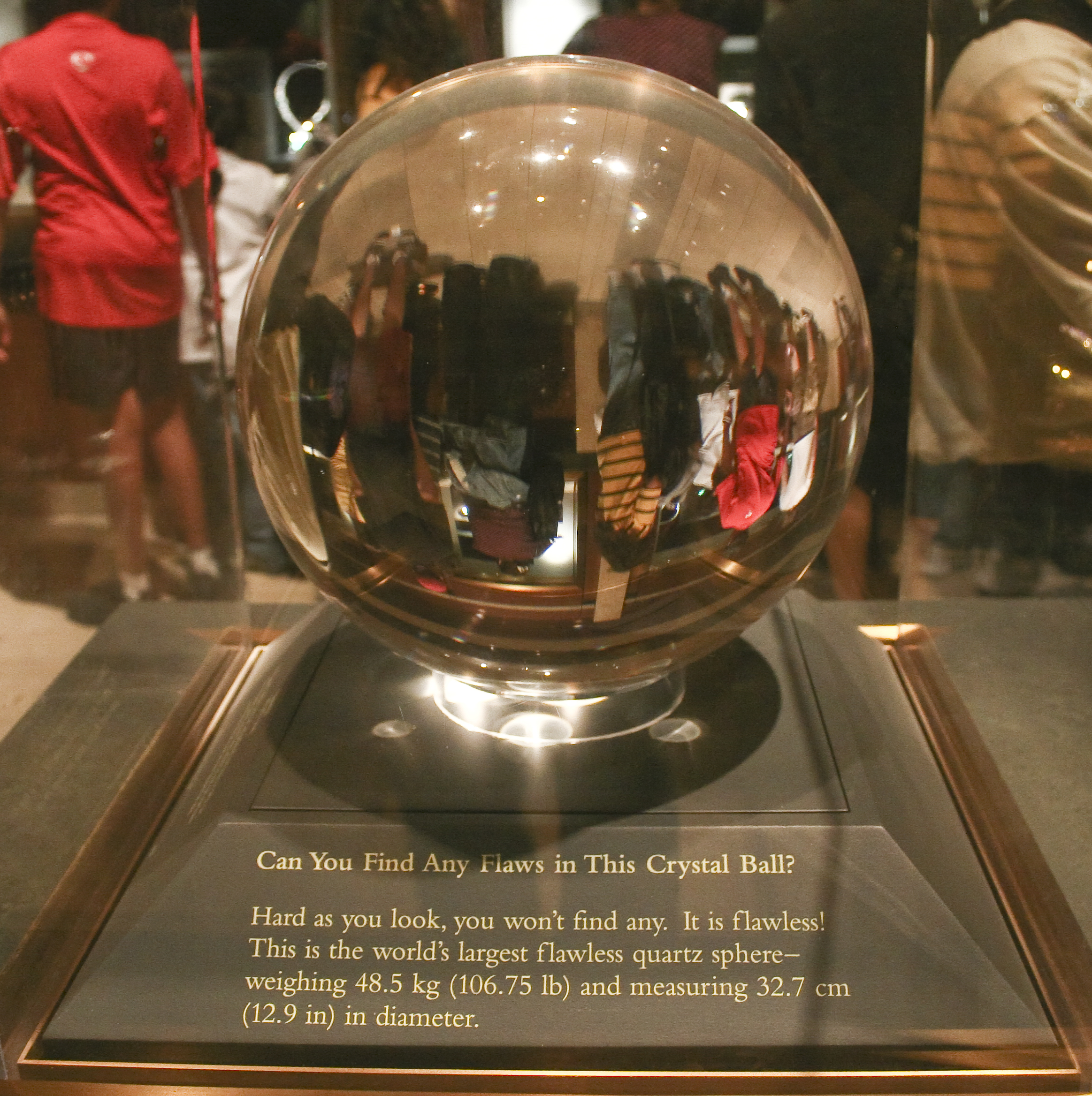
The largest flawless quartz sphere is in the National Museum of Natural History, Washington D.C.

A crystal ball was among the grave-goods of the Merovingian King, Childeric I (c. 437–481 AD). The grave-goods were discovered in 1653. In 1831, they were stolen from the royal library in France where they were being kept. Few items were ever recovered. The crystal ball was not among them.

The Sceptre of Scotland has a crystal ball in its finial, honoring the tradition of their use by pagan druids. It was made in Italy in the 15th century, and was a gift to James IV from Pope Alexander VI.

The Penn Museum in Philadelphia displays the third-largest crystal ball as the central object in its Chinese Rotunda. Weighing 49 pounds (22 kg), the sphere is made of quartz crystal from Burma and was shaped through years of constant rotation in a semi-cylindrical container filled with emery, garnet powder, and water. The ornamental treasure was purportedly made for the Empress Dowager Cixi (1835–1908) during the Qing dynasty in the 19th century, but no evidence as to its actual origins exists. The crystal ball and an ancient Egyptian statuette which depicted the god Osiris were stolen in 1988. They were recovered three years later with no damage done to either object.

== See also ==
- Crystal skull
- Magic Mirror (Snow White)
- Palantír
- Salvator Mundi (Leonardo), da Vinci's "Savior of the World" painting depicting Christ holding a crystal ball
- Seer stone (Latter Day Saints)
- Yard globe
