= Chronomancy =

Divination of the best time to do something

Chronomancy, also known as hemerology or calendar astrology, is a generalized term for divination the determination of lucky and unlucky days and of the best time to do something, popular in ancient East Asia, particularly China. Practitioners would utilize calendars and other temporal data to determine the auspiciousness of future days.

The term "chronomancy", stemming from the Greek word chronos (meaning time), and the word manteia (meaning divination) is also used in fiction to refer to a school of magic involving supernatural manipulation of time.

== Role in modern fantasy ==
In modern fantasy role-playing games, such as Dungeons & Dragons and other games set in the Forgotten Realms universe, chronomancy refers to a school of magic related to moving through and manipulating time.

== See also ==
- Biorhythm (pseudoscience)
