= Scyphomancy =

Divination using a cup or goblet

Scyphomancy (Greek skýphos, cup, or drinking bowl, and manteia, divination) is divination using a cup or goblet. This may involve forecasting or representing by using a cup of water and reading the signs specified by certain articles floating on the water. It is considered one of the oldest methods of foretelling the future by means of crystalline reflection, both in ancient Egypt and Persia.

== Description ==
American folklorist Charles Godfrey Leland describes it in his 1891 book Gypsy Sorcery and Fortune Telling, in relation to the ritualistic practices of the Roma:

In connection with divination, deceit, and robbery, it may be observed that gypsies in Eastern Europe, as in India, often tell fortunes or answer questions by taking a goblet or glass, tapping it, and pretending to hear a voice in the ring which speaks to them. This method of divination is one of the few which may have occurred sporadically, or independently in different places, as there is so much in a ringing, vibrating sound which resembles a voice. The custom is very ancient and almost universal; so Joseph (Genesis 44:5) says ("Vulgate"), "Scyphus quam furati estis, ipse est, in quo bibit Dominus meus, et in quo augurari solet." (The goblet which ye have stolen, is it not this wherein my lord drinketh and in which he is wont to divine?) Joseph says again (v. 15), "Know ye not that such a man as I can certainly divine." A great number of very orthodox scholars have endeavoured to show that "divine" here means merely "to conjecture wisely," or "to see into," in order to clear Joseph from the accusation of fortune-telling: but the cup and his interpretation of dreams tell another story. In those days in the East, as now, clever men made their way very often by fortune-telling and theurgia in different forms in great families, just as ladies and gentlemen are "invited out" in London and Paris to please the company with palmistry.

== See also ==
- Scrying – Seeking visions in a reflective surface
- Psychomanteum – A kind of structure built for the paranormal activity of communicating with spirits.
