= Naeviology =

Divination by observing moles or other bodily marks

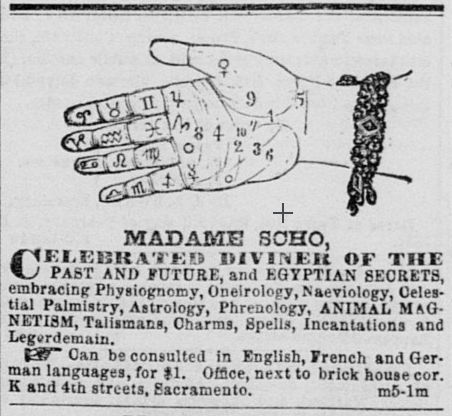
1857 advertisement offering naeviology as a service

Naeviology is a method of divination which looks at the moles, scars, or other bodily marks on a person as a means of telling their future. It peaked in popularity between the 1700 and 1800s. Several scientific papers have tried to automate the process of mole reading.

In India this practice is called moleology or moleosophy. There is a related process called Chinese facial mole reading which links mole locations primarily on the face with personality traits or future life events; there are smartphone applications which claim to foretell the future using the phone's camera to survey moles.
