= Edmund Parish =

German psychologist and hallucination researcher

- Born: 1861
- Died: 1916 (aged 54–55)
- Occupation: Psychologist
- Known for: Research on hallucinations

Edmund Parish (1861–1916) was a German psychologist and hallucination researcher.

Parish is known for producing a dissociation model of hallucinations. Parish was skeptical of parapsychology. He disputed the claims of telepathy made by the members of the Society for Psychical Research. His book Hallucinations and Illusions: A Study of the Fallacies of Perception discusses the fallacies of memory and perception and explores waking hallucinations of healthy persons. It was republished in 2011 by the Cambridge Library Collection.

== Publications ==
- Hallucinations and Illusions: A Study of the Fallacies of Perception (1897)
