= Lithomancy =

Divination by stones

Lithomancy is a form of divination by which the future is told using stones or the reflected light from the stones. The practice is most popular in the British Isles.

== History ==
The earliest verified account of lithomancy comes from Photius, the patriarch of Constantinople, who describes a physician named Eusebius using a stone called a baetulum to perform the ritual. However, some writers also claim that Helenus predicted the destruction of Troy using the ritual.

== Practice ==
Lithomancy as a general term covers everything from two-stone and three-stone readings to open-ended stone castings utilizing an undetermined number of stones.

In one popular method, 13 stones are tossed onto a board and a prediction made based on the pattern in which they fall. The stones are representative of various concepts: fortune, magic, love, news, home life and the astrological planets of Mercury, Venus, Mars, Jupiter, Saturn, the sun, and the moon.
