= Psychomanteum =

Structure for communicating with the dead

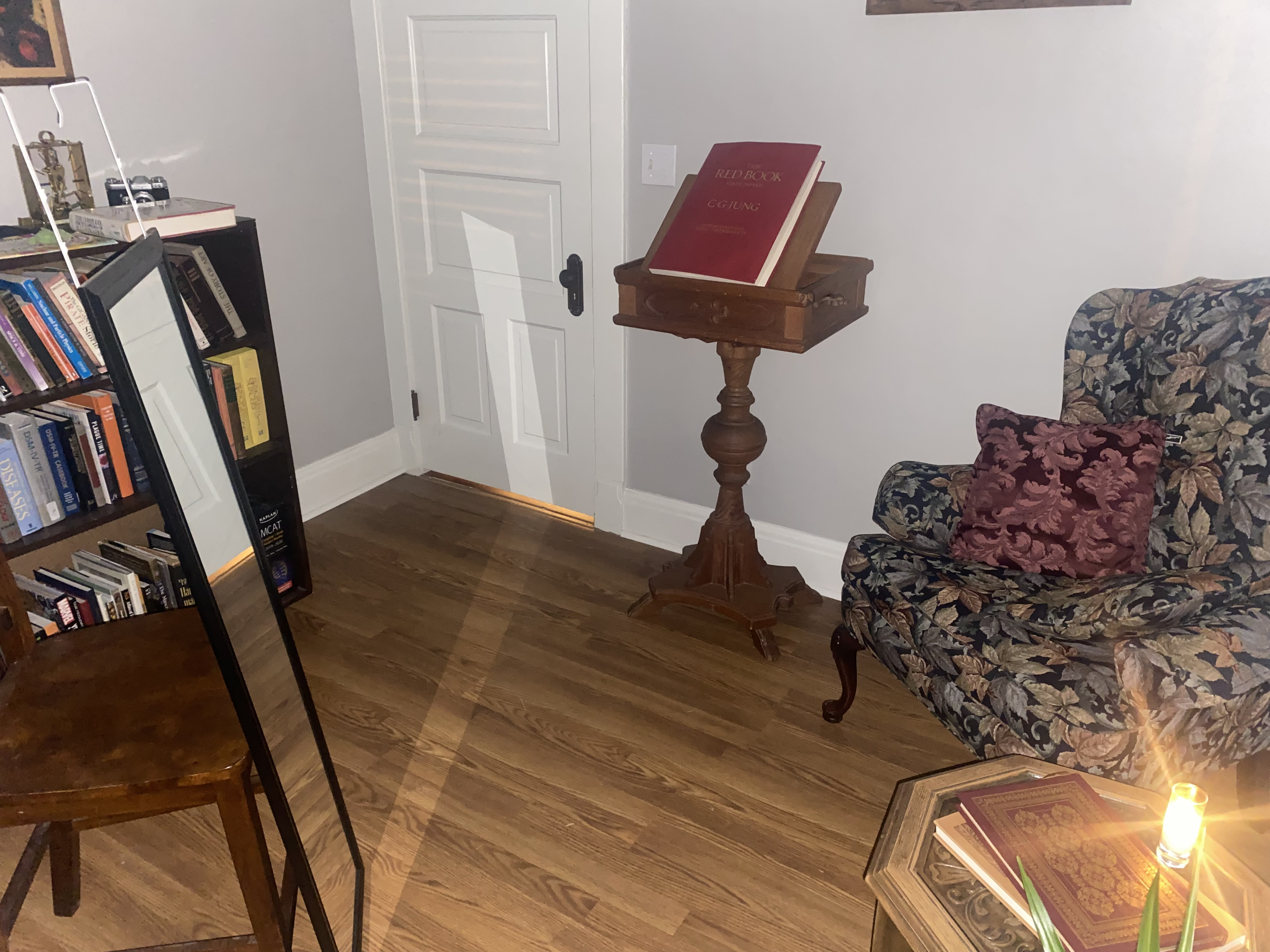
Psychomanteum example setup in dark room using flash photography.

In parapsychology and Spiritualism, a psychomanteum is a small, enclosed area set up with a comfortable chair, dim lighting, and a mirror angled so as not to reflect anything but darkness intended to communicate with spirits of the dead.

== History ==
The psychomanteum was popularized by Raymond Moody, originator of the term near-death experience, in his 1993 book, Reunions: Visionary Encounters with Departed Loved Ones. Raymond Moody believed the psychomanteum was useful as a tool to resolve grief. The chamber was kept darkened and illuminated only by a candle or a dim light bulb. Subjects gaze into the reflected darkness hoping to see and make contact with spirits of the dead. Moody compared the psychomanteum to the Greek Necromanteion, and said its function was a form of scrying.

== See also ==
- Catoptromancy – Divination using a mirror
