= Graphite oxide =

Compound of carbon, oxygen, and hydrogen

Structure proposed in 1998 with functional groups. A: Epoxy bridges, B: Hydroxyl groups, C: Pairwise carboxyl groups.

Graphite oxide (GO), formerly called graphitic oxide or graphitic acid, is a compound of carbon, oxygen, and hydrogen in variable ratios, obtained by treating graphite with strong oxidizers and acids for resolving of extra metals. The maximally oxidized bulk product is a yellow solid with C:O ratio between 2.1 and 2.9, that retains the layer structure of graphite but with a much larger and irregular spacing.

The bulk material spontaneously disperses in basic solutions or can be dispersed by sonication in polar solvents to yield monomolecular sheets, known as graphene oxide by analogy to graphene, the single-layer form of graphite. Graphene oxide sheets have been used to prepare strong paper-like materials, membranes, thin films, and composite materials. Initially, graphene oxide attracted substantial interest as a possible intermediate for the manufacture of graphene. The graphene obtained by reduction of graphene oxide still has many chemical and structural defects which is a problem for some applications but an advantage for some others.

== History and preparation ==
Graphite oxide was first prepared by Oxford chemist Benjamin C. Brodie in 1859 by treating graphite with a mixture of potassium chlorate (KClO_{3}) and fuming nitric acid (HNO_{3}). He reported synthesis of "paper-like foils" with 0.05 mm thickness. In 1957, Hummers and Offeman developed a safer, quicker, and more efficient process called Hummers' method, using a mixture of sulfuric acid (H_{2}SO_{4}), sodium nitrate (NaNO_{3}), and potassium permanganate (KMnO_{4}), which is still widely used, often with some modifications. Largest monolayer GO with highly intact carbon framework and minimal residual impurity concentrations can be synthesized in inert containers using highly pure reactants and solvents.

Graphite oxides exhibit considerable variation in properties with oxidation degree and synthesis method. For example, the temperature point of explosive exfoliation is generally higher for graphite oxide prepared by the Brodie method compared to Hummers graphite oxide, the difference is up to 100 degrees with the same heating rates. The hydration and solvation properties of Brodie and Hummers graphite oxides are also remarkably different.

Recently a mixture of H_{2}SO_{4} and KMnO_{4} has been used to cut open carbon nanotubes lengthwise, resulting in microscopic flat ribbons of graphene, a few atoms wide, with the edges "capped" by oxygen atoms (=O) or hydroxyl groups (–OH).

Graphite (graphene) oxide has also been prepared by using a "bottom-up" synthesis method (Tang-Lau method) in which the sole reagent source is glucose; the process is safer, simpler, and more environmentally friendly compared to the traditional "top-down" method, in which strong oxidizers are involved. Another important advantage of the Tang-Lau method is the control of thickness, ranging from monolayer to multilayers, by adjusting growth parameters.

== Structure ==
The structure and properties of graphite oxide depend on the particular synthesis method and degree of oxidation. It typically preserves the layer structure of the parent graphite, but the layers are buckled and the interlayer spacing is about two times larger (~0.7 nm) than that of graphite. Strictly speaking "oxide" is an incorrect but historically established name. Besides epoxide groups (bridging oxygen atoms), other functional groups found experimentally are: carbonyl (C=O), hydroxyl (-OH), phenol and for graphite oxides prepared using sulphuric acid (e.g. Hummers method) some impurity of sulphur is often found, for example in a form of organosulfate groups. The detailed structure is still not understood due to the strong disorder and irregular packing of the layers.

Graphene oxide layers are about 1.1 ± 0.2 nm thick. Scanning tunneling microscopy shows the presence of local regions where oxygen atoms are arranged in a rectangular pattern with lattice constant 0.27 nm × 0.41 nm. The edges of each layer are terminated with carboxyl and carbonyl groups. X-ray photoelectron spectroscopy shows the presence of several C_{1s} peaks, their number and relative intensity depending on the particular oxidation method used. Assignment of these peaks to certain carbon functionalization types is somewhat uncertain and still under debate. For example, one interpretation goes as follows: non-oxygenated ring contexts (284.8 eV), C-O (286.2 eV), C=O (287.8 eV) and O-C=O (289.0 eV). Another interpretation, using density functional theory calculation, goes as follows: C=C with defects such as functional groups and pentagons (283.6 eV), C=C (non-oxygenated ring contexts) (284.3 eV), sp^{3}C-H in the basal plane and C=C with functional groups (285.0 eV), C=O and C=C with functional groups, C-O (286.5 eV), and O-C=O (288.3 eV).

Graphite oxide is hydrophilic and easily hydrated when exposed to water vapor or immersed in liquid water, resulting in a distinct increase of the inter-planar distance (up to 1.2 nm in saturated state). Additional water is also incorporated into the interlayer space due to high pressure induced effects. The maximal hydration state of graphite oxide in liquid water corresponds to insertion of 2-3 water monolayers. Cooling the graphite oxide/H_{2}O samples results in "pseudo-negative thermal expansion" and cooling below the freezing point of water results in de-insertion of one water monolayer and lattice contraction. Complete removal of water from the structure seems difficult since heating at 60–80 °C results in partial decomposition and degradation of the material.

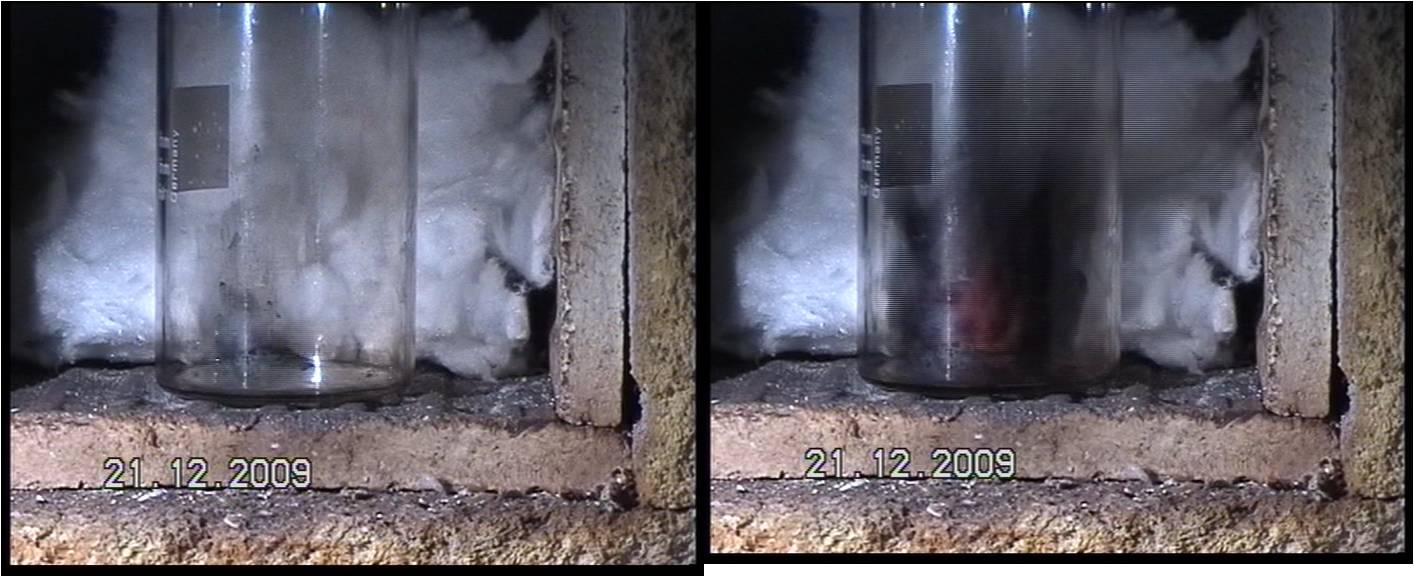
Exfoliation of graphite oxide at high temperature, screenshots from a video. Exfoliation results in tenfold increase of sample volume and formation of carbon powder with grains of few graphene layers thickness.

Similar to water, graphite oxide easily incorporates other polar solvents, e.g. alcohols. However, intercalation of polar solvents occurs significantly different in Brodie and Hummers graphite oxides. Brodie graphite oxide is intercalated at ambient conditions by one monolayer of alcohols and several other solvents (e.g. dimethylformamide and acetone) when liquid solvent is available in excess. Separation of graphite oxide layers is proportional to the size of alcohol molecule. Cooling of Brodie graphite oxide immersed in excess of liquid methanol, ethanol, acetone and dimethylformamide results in step-like insertion of an additional solvent monolayer and lattice expansion. The phase transition detected by X-ray diffraction and differential scanning calorimetry (DSC) is reversible; de-insertion of solvent monolayer is observed when sample is heated back from low temperatures. An additional methanol and ethanol monolayer is reversibly inserted into the structure of Brodie graphite oxide under high pressure conditions.

Hummers graphite oxide is intercalated with two methanol or ethanol monolayers at ambient temperature. The interlayer distance of Hummers graphite oxide in an excess of liquid alcohols increases gradually upon temperature decrease, reaching 19.4 and 20.6 Å at 140 K for methanol and ethanol, respectively. The gradual expansion of the Hummers graphite oxide lattice upon cooling corresponds to insertion of at least two additional solvent monolayers.

Graphite oxide exfoliates and decomposes when rapidly heated at moderately high temperatures (~280–300 °C) with formation of finely dispersed amorphous carbon, somewhat similar to activated carbon.

== Characterization ==
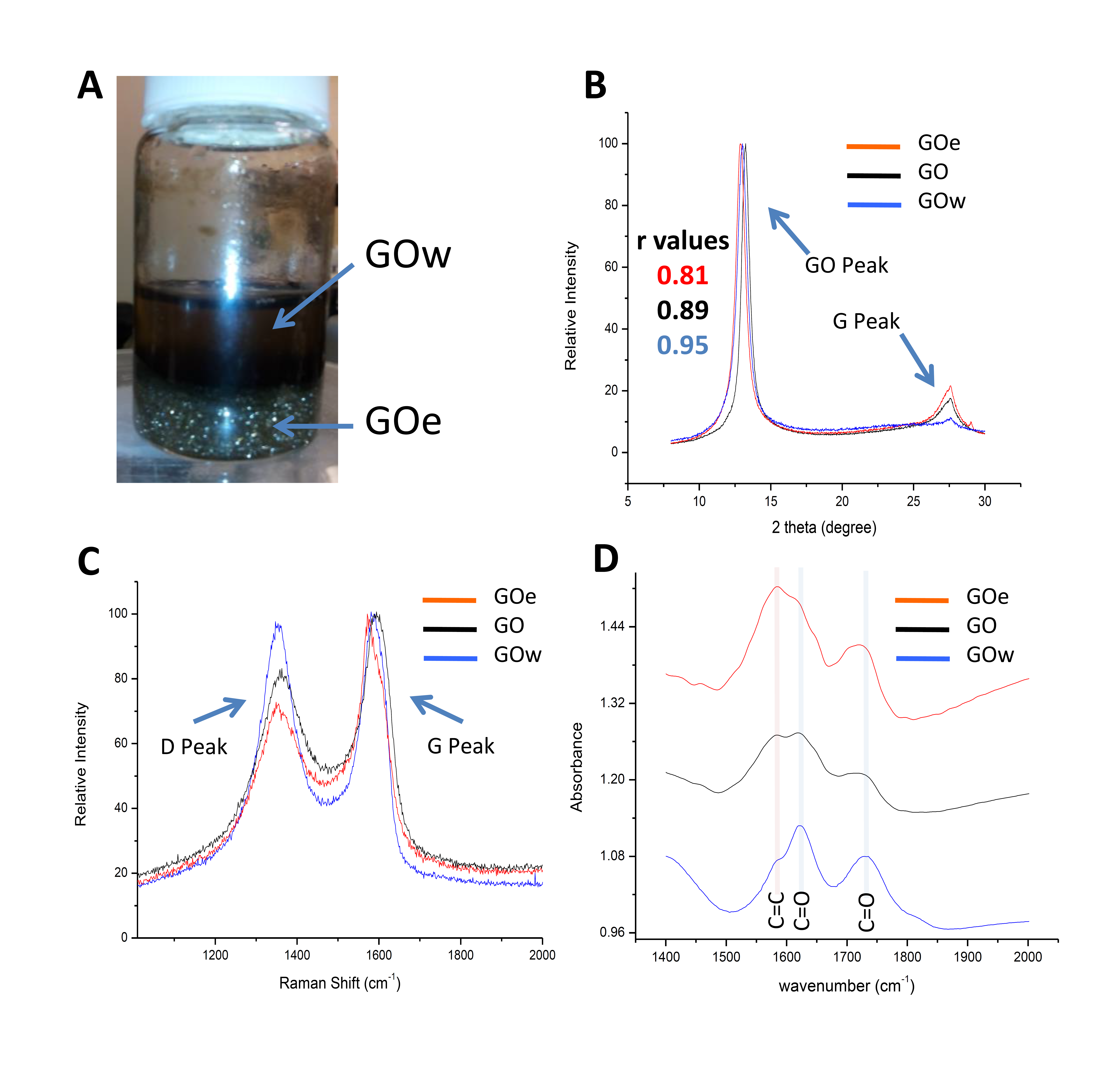
(A) Image of fractionated GO, (B) XRD, (C) Raman, and (D) FTIR spectra of GO (black), more oxidized GOw fraction (blue), and less oxidized GOe fraction (red).

XRD, FTIR, Raman, XPS, AFM, TEM, SEM/EDX, Thermogravimetric analysis etc. are some common techniques used to characterize GO samples. Experimental results of graphite/graphene oxide have been analyzed by calculation in detail. Since the distribution of oxygen functionalities on GO sheets is polydisperse, fractionation methods can be used to characterize and separate GO sheets on the basis of oxidation. Different synthesis methods give rise to different types of graphene oxide. Even different batches from similar oxidation methods can have differences in their properties due to variations in purification or quenching processes.

== Surface properties ==
It is also possible to modify the surface of graphene oxide to change its properties. Graphene oxide has unique surface properties which make it a very good surfactant material stabilizing various emulsion systems. Graphene oxide remains at the interface of the emulsions systems due to the difference in surface energy of the two phases separated by the interface.

== Relation to water ==
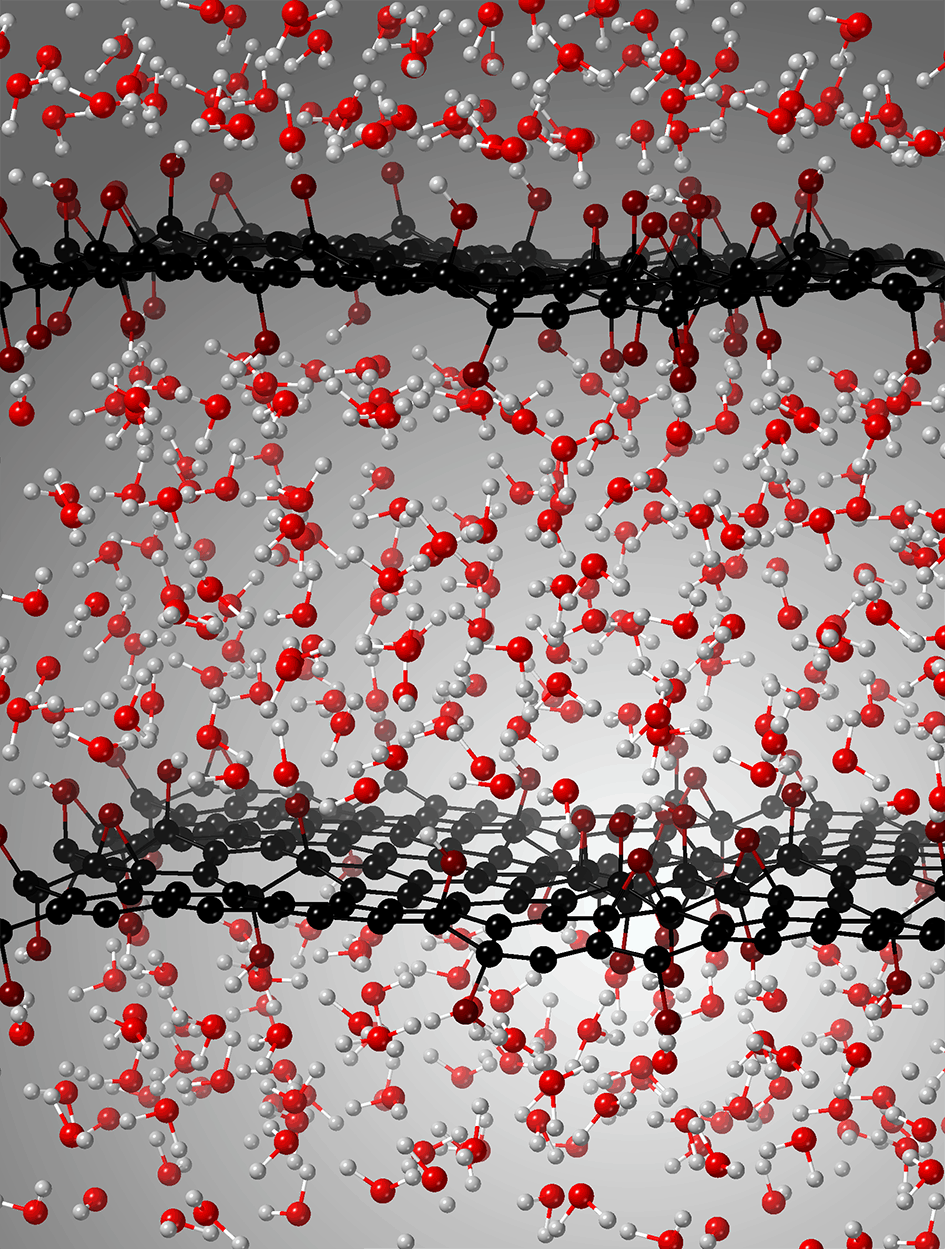
Graphene oxide in liquid water.

Graphite oxides absorb moisture in proportion to humidity and swell in liquid water. The amount of water absorbed by graphite oxides depends on the particular synthesis method and shows a strong temperature dependence.

Brodie graphite oxide selectively absorbs methanol from water/methanol mixtures in a certain range of methanol concentrations.

Membranes prepared from graphite oxides (recently more often called "graphene oxide" membranes) are vacuum tight and impermeable to nitrogen and oxygen, but are permeable to water vapors. The membranes are also impermeable to "substances of lower molecular weight". Permeation of graphite and graphene oxide membranes by polar solvents is possible due to swelling of the graphite oxide structure. The membranes in swelled state are also permeable by gases, e.g. helium. Graphene oxide sheets are chemically reactive in liquid water, leading them to acquire a small negative charge.

The interlayer distance of dried graphite oxides was reported as ~6–7 Å but in liquid water it increases up to 11–13 Å at room temperature. The lattice expansion becomes stronger at lower temperatures. The inter-layer distance in diluted NaOH reached infinity, resulting in dispersion of graphite oxide into single-layered graphene oxide sheets in solution. Graphite oxide can be used as a cation exchange membrane for materials such as KCl, HCl, CaCl_{2}, MgCl_{2}, BaCl_{2} solutions. The membranes were permeable by large alkali ions as they are able to penetrate between graphene oxide layers.

== Applications ==
=== Optical nonlinearity ===
Nonlinear optical materials are of great importance for ultrafast photonics and optoelectronics. Recently, the giant optical nonlinearities of graphene oxide (GO) has proven useful for a number of applications. For example, the optical limiting of GO is indispensable in the protection of sensitive instruments from laser-induced damage. And the saturable absorption can be used for pulse compression, mode-locking and Q-switching. Also, the nonlinear refraction (Kerr effect) is crucial for applications including all-optical switching, signal regeneration, and fast optical communications.

An intriguing property of GO is that its electrical and optical properties can be tuned dynamically by manipulating the content of oxygen-containing groups through either chemical or physical reduction methods. The tuning of the optical nonlinearities has been demonstrated during the laser-induced reduction process through the continuous increase of the laser irradiance, and four stages of different nonlinear activities have been discovered, which may serve as promising solid state materials for novel nonlinear functional devices. Metal nanoparticles can greatly enhance the optical nonlinearity and fluorescence of graphene oxide.

=== Graphene manufacture ===
Graphite oxide has attracted much interest as a possible route for the large-scale production and manipulation of graphene, a material with extraordinary electronic properties. Graphite oxide itself is an insulator, almost a semiconductor, with differential conductivity between 1 and 5×10^{−3} S/cm at a bias voltage of 10 V. However, being hydrophilic, graphite oxide disperses readily in water, breaking up into macroscopic flakes, mostly one layer thick. Chemical reduction of these flakes would yield a suspension of graphene flakes. It was argued that the first experimental observation of graphene was reported by Hanns-Peter Boehm in 1962. In this early work the existence of monolayer reduced graphene oxide flakes was demonstrated. The contribution of Boehm was recently acknowledged by Andre Geim, the Nobel Prize winner for graphene research.

Partial reduction can be achieved by treating the suspended graphene oxide with hydrazine hydrate at 100 °C for 24 hours, by exposing graphene oxide to hydrogen plasma for a few seconds, or by exposure to a strong pulse of light, such as that of a xenon flash. Due to the oxidation protocol, manifold defects already present in graphene oxide hamper the effectiveness of the reduction. Thus, the graphene quality obtained after reduction is limited by the precursor quality (graphene oxide) and the efficiency of the reducing agent. However, the conductivity of the graphene obtained by this route is below 10 S/cm, and the charge mobility is between 0.1 and 10 cm^{2}/Vs. These values are much greater than the oxide's, but still a few orders of magnitude lower than those of pristine graphene. Recently, the synthetic protocol for graphite oxide was optimized and almost intact graphene oxide with a preserved carbon framework was obtained. Reduction of this almost intact graphene oxide performs much better and the mobility values of charge carriers exceeds 1000 cm^{2}/Vs for the best quality of flakes. Inspection with the atomic force microscope shows that the oxygen bonds distort the carbon layer, creating a pronounced intrinsic roughness in the oxide layers which persists after reduction. These defects also show up in Raman spectra of graphene oxide.

Large amounts of graphene sheets may also be produced through thermal methods. For example, in 2006 a method was discovered that simultaneously exfoliates and reduces graphite oxide by rapid heating (>2000 °C/min) to 1050 °C. At this temperature, carbon dioxide is released as the oxygen functionalities are removed and it explosively separates the sheets as it comes out. The temperature of reduction is important for the oxygen content of the final product, with higher degree of reduction for higher reduction temperatures.

Exposing a film of graphite oxide to the laser of a LightScribe DVD has also revealed to produce quality graphene at a low cost.

Graphene oxide has also been reduced to graphene in situ, using a 3D printed pattern of engineered E. coli bacteria. Coupling of graphene oxide with biomolecules such as peptide, proteins and enzymes enhances its biomedical applications. Currently, researchers are focused on reducing graphene oxide using non-toxic substances; tea and coffee powder, lemon extract and various plants based antioxidants are widely used.

=== Water purification ===
Graphite oxides were studied for desalination of water using reverse osmosis beginning in the 1960s. In 2011, additional results from research were published.

In 2013, Lockheed Martin announced their Perforene graphene filter. Lockheed claims the filter reduces energy costs for reverse osmosis desalination by 99%. Lockheed claimed that the filter was 500 times thinner than the best filter on the market, 1,000 times stronger, and required 1% of the pressure. The product was not expected to be released until 2020.

Another study showed that graphite oxide could be engineered to allow water to pass while retaining some larger ions. Narrow capillaries allow rapid permeation by mono- or bilayer water. Multilayer laminates have a structure similar to nacre, which provides mechanical strength in water-free conditions. Helium cannot pass through the membranes in humidity-free conditions, but penetrates easily when exposed to humidity, whereas water vapor passes with no resistance. Dry laminates are vacuum-tight, but immersed in water, they act as molecular sieves, blocking some solutes.

A third project produced graphene sheets with subnanoscale (0.40 ± 0.24 nm) pores. The graphene was bombarded with gallium ions, which disrupt carbon bonds. Etching the result with an oxidizing solution produces a hole at each spot struck by a gallium ion. The length of time spent in the oxidizing solution determined the average pore size. Pore density reached 5 trillion pores per square centimeter, while retaining structural integrity. The pores permitted cationss transport after short oxidation periods, consistent with electrostatic repulsion from negatively charged functional groups at pore edges. After longer oxidation periods, sheets were permeable to salt but not larger organic molecules.

In 2015, a team fabricated a graphene oxide home water purification system resembling a "tea bag" that, over the course of a day, can remove 95% of heavy metals when immersed in a drinking-water pot. A composite comprising small NiFe_{2}O_{4} ferrimagnetic nanoparticles and partially reduced graphene oxide functionalized with nitrogen atoms was successfully used to remove Cr(III) ions from water. The advantage of this nanocomposite is that it can be magnetically separated from water. One project layered carbon atoms in a honeycomb structure, forming a hexagon-shaped crystal that measured about 0.1 millimeters in width and length, with subnanometer holes. Later work increased the membrane size to on the order of several millimeters.

Graphene attached to a polycarbonate support structure was initially effective at removing salt. However, defects formed in the graphene. Filling larger defects with nylon and small defects with hafnium metal, followed by a layer of oxide, restored the filtration effect.

In 2016, engineers developed graphene-based films powered by the sun that can filter dirty/salty water. Bacteria were used to produce a material consisting of two nanocellulose layers. The lower layer contains pristine cellulose, while the top layer contains cellulose and graphene oxide, which absorb sunlight and produce heat. The system draws water from below into the material. The water diffuses into the higher layer, where it evaporates, leaving behind any contaminants. The vapor condenses on top, where it can be captured. The film is produced by repeatedly adding a fluid coating that hardens. Bacteria produce nanocellulose fibers with interspersed graphene oxide flakes. The film is light and easily manufactured at scale.

=== Coating ===
Optically transparent, multilayer films made from graphene oxide are impermeable under dry conditions. Exposed to water (or water vapor), they allow passage of molecules below a certain size. The films consist of millions of randomly stacked flakes, leaving nano-sized capillaries between them. Closing these nanocapillaries using chemical reduction with hydroiodic acid creates "reduced graphene oxide" (r-GO) films that are completely impermeable to gases, liquids or strong chemicals greater than 100 nanometers thick. Glassware or copper plates covered with such a graphene "paint" can be used as containers for corrosive acids. Graphene-coated plastic films could be used in medical packaging to improve shelf life. Layer-by-layer coatings based on amine-modified graphene oxide and Nafion show excellent antimicrobial performance that is not compromised when heated for 2 hours at 200 °C.

=== Related materials ===
Dispersed graphene oxide flakes can also be sifted out of the dispersion (as in paper manufacture) and pressed to make an exceedingly strong graphene oxide paper.

Graphene oxide has been used in DNA analysis applications. The large planar surface of graphene oxide allows simultaneous quenching of multiple DNA probes labeled with different dyes, providing the detection of multiple DNA targets in the same solution. Further advances in graphene oxide based DNA sensors could result in very inexpensive rapid DNA analysis. Recently a group of researchers, from university of L'Aquila (Italy), discovered new wetting properties of graphene oxide thermally reduced in ultra-high vacuum up to 900 °C. They found a correlation between the surface chemical composition, the surface free energy and its polar and dispersive components, giving a rationale for the wetting properties of graphene oxide and reduced graphene oxide.

=== Flexible rechargeable battery electrode ===
Graphene oxide has been demonstrated as a flexible free-standing battery anode material for room temperature lithium-ion and sodium-ion batteries. It is also being studied as a high surface area conducting agent in lithium-sulfur battery cathodes. The functional groups on graphene oxide can serve as sites for chemical modification and immobilization of active species. This approach allows for the creation of hybrid architectures for electrode materials. Recent examples of this have been implemented in lithium-ion batteries, which are known for being rechargeable at the cost of low capacity limits. Graphene oxide-based composites functionalized with metal oxides and sulfides have been shown in recent research to induce enhanced battery performance. This has similarly been adapted into applications in supercapacitors, since the electronic properties of graphene oxide allow it to bypass some of the more prevalent restrictions of typical transition metal oxide electrodes. Research in this field is developing, with additional exploration into methods involving nitrogen doping and pH adjustment to improve capacitance. Additionally, research into reduced graphene oxide sheets, which display superior electronic properties akin to pure graphene, is currently being explored. Reduced graphene oxide greatly increases the conductivity and efficiency, while sacrificing some flexibility and structural integrity.

=== Graphene oxide lens ===
The optical lens has been playing a critical role in almost all areas of science and technology since its invention about 3000 years ago. With the advances in micro- and nanofabrication techniques, continued miniaturization of the conventional optical lenses has always been requested for various applications such as communications, sensors, data storage and a wide range of other technology-driven and consumer-driven industries. Specifically, ever smaller sizes, as well as thinner thicknesses of micro lenses, are highly needed for subwavelength optics or nano-optics with extremely small structures, particularly for visible and near-IR applications. Also, as the distance scale for optical communications shrinks, the required feature sizes of micro lenses are rapidly pushed down.

Recently, the excellent properties of newly discovered graphene oxide provide novel solutions to overcome the challenges of current planar focusing devices. Specifically, giant refractive index modification (as large as 10^-1), which is one order of magnitude larger than the current materials, between graphene oxide (GO) and reduced graphene oxide (rGO) have been demonstrated by dynamically manipulating its oxygen content using the direct laser writing (DLW) method. As a result, the overall lens thickness can be potentially reduced by more than ten times. Also, the linear optical absorption of GO is found to increase as the reduction of GO deepens, which results in transmission contrast between GO and rGO and therefore provides an amplitude modulation mechanism. Moreover, both the refractive index and the optical absorption are found to be dispersionless over a broad wavelength range from visible to near infrared. Finally, GO film offers flexible patterning capability by using the maskless DLW method, which reduces the manufacturing complexity and requirements.

As a result, a novel ultrathin planar lens on a GO thin film has been realized recently using the DLW method. The distinct advantage of the GO flat lens is that phase modulation and amplitude modulation can be achieved simultaneously, which are attributed to the giant refractive index modulation and the variable linear optical absorption of GO during its reduction process, respectively. Due to the enhanced wavefront shaping capability, the lens thickness is pushed down to subwavelength scale (~200 nm), which is thinner than all current dielectric lenses (~ μm scale). The focusing intensities and the focal length can be controlled effectively by varying the laser powers and the lens sizes, respectively. By using an oil immersion high numerical aperture (NA) objective during DLW process, 300 nm fabrication feature size on GO film has been realized, and therefore the minimum lens size has been shrunk down to 4.6 μm in diameter, which is the smallest planar micro lens and can only be realized with metasurface by FIB. Thereafter, the focal length can be reduced to as small as 0.8 μm, which would potentially increase the numerical aperture (NA) and the focusing resolution.

The full-width at half-maximum (FWHM) of 320 nm at the minimum focal spot using a 650 nm input beam has been demonstrated experimentally, which corresponding to the effective NA of 1.24 (n=1.5), the largest NA of current micro lenses. Furthermore, ultra-broadband focusing capability from 500 nm to as far as 2 μm have been realized with the same planar lens, which is still a major challenge of focusing in infrared range due to limited availability of suitable materials and fabrication technology. Most importantly, the synthesized high quality GO thin films can be flexibly integrated on various substrates and easily manufactured by using the one-step DLW method over a large area at a comparable low cost and power (~nJ/pulse), which eventually makes the GO flat lenses promising for various practical applications.

=== Energy conversion ===
Photocatalytic water splitting is an artificial photosynthesis process in which water is dissociated into hydrogen (H2) and oxygen (O2), using artificial or natural light. Methods such as photocatalytic water splitting are currently being investigated to produce hydrogen as a clean source of energy. The superior electron mobility and high surface area of graphene oxide sheets suggest it may be implemented as a catalyst that meets the requirements for this process. Specifically, graphene oxide's compositional functional groups of epoxide (-O-) and hydroxide (-OH) allow for more flexible control in the water splitting process. This flexibility can be used to tailor the band gap and band positions that are targeted in photocatalytic water splitting. Recent research experiments have demonstrated that the photocatalytic activity of graphene oxide containing a band gap within the required limits has produced effective splitting results, particularly when used with 40-50% coverage at a 2:1 hydroxide:epoxide ratio. When used in composite materials with CdS (a typical catalyst used in photocatalytic water splitting), graphene oxide nanocomposites have been shown to exhibit increased hydrogen production and quantum efficiency.

=== Hydrogen storage ===
Graphene oxide is also being explored for its applications in hydrogen storage. Hydrogen molecules can be stored among the oxygen-based functional groups found throughout the sheet. This hydrogen storage capability can be further manipulated by modulating the interlayer distance between sheets, as well as making changes to the pore sizes. Research in transition metal decoration on carbon sorbents to enhance hydrogen binding energy has led to experiments with titanium and magnesium anchored to hydroxyl groups, allowing for the binding of multiple hydrogen molecules.

=== Precision medicine ===
Graphene oxide has been studied for its promising uses in a wide variety of nanomedical applications including tissue engineering, cancer treatment, medical imaging, and drug delivery. Its physiochemical properties allow for a structure to regulate the behaviour of stem cells, with the potential to assist in the intracellular delivery of DNA, growth factors, and synthetic proteins that could allow for the repair and regeneration of muscle tissue. Due to its unique behaviour in biological environments, GO has also been proposed as a novel material in early cancer diagnosis.

It has also been explored for its uses in vaccines and immunotherapy, including as a dual-use adjuvant and carrier of biomedical materials. In September 2020, researchers at the Shanghai National Engineering Research Center for Nanotechnology in China filed a patent for use of graphene oxide in a recombinant vaccine under development against SARS-CoV-2.

== Toxicity ==
Several typical mechanisms underlying graphene (oxide) nanomaterial's toxicity have been revealed, for instance, physical destruction, oxidative stress, DNA damage, inflammatory response, apoptosis, autophagy, and necrosis. In these mechanisms, toll-like receptors (TLR), transforming growth factor-beta (TGF-β) and tumor necrosis factor-alpha (TNF-α) dependent-pathways are involved in the signalling pathway network, and oxidative stress plays a crucial role in these pathways. Many experiments have shown that graphene (oxide) nanomaterials have toxic side effects in many biological applications, but more in-depth study of toxicity mechanisms is needed. According to the USA FDA, graphene, graphene oxide, and reduced graphene oxide elicit toxic effects both in vitro and in vivo. Graphene-family nanomaterials (GFN) are not approved by the USA FDA for human consumption.

== See also ==
- Oxocarbon
