= Pers sunshine recorder =

Type of sunshine recorder using a lens and mirror

A Pers sunshine recorder is a sunshine recorder in which sunlight is focused by a lens and reflected by a hemispherical mirror, tracing the sun's path onto photosensitive paper. One advantage of this design is that it can be used at any latitude.
