= Rudolf Luneburg =

Rudolf Karl Lüneburg
- Born: 30 March 1903; Volkersheim (Bockenem)
- Died: 19 August 1949 (aged 46); Great Falls, Montana, United States
- Education: University of Göttingen
- Known for: Luneburg lens, Luneburg method

Rudolf Karl Lüneburg (30 March 1903, Volkersheim (Bockenem) - 19 August 1949, Great Falls, Montana), after his emigration at first Lueneburg, later Luneburg, sometimes misspelled Luneberg or Lunenberg) was a professor of mathematics and optics at the Dartmouth College Eye Institute. He was born in Germany, received his doctorate at Göttingen, and emigrated to the United States in 1935.

His work included an analysis of the geometry of visual space as expected from physiology and the assumption that the angle of vergence provides a constant measure of distance. From these premises he concluded that near field visual space is hyperbolic. In 1944, he proposed a design for a spherical gradient-index lens, now known as the Luneburg lens. He also described a method of obtaining the equations of geometrical optics by analysing surfaces of discontinuities of solutions to Maxwell's equations, which is now known as the Luneburg method.

== Bibliography ==
- Lüneburg, Rudolf Karl (1930). Das Problem der Irrfahrt ohne Richtungsbeschränkung und die Randwertaufgabe der Potentialtheorie (Dissertation) (in German). Göttingen, Germany: Universität Göttingen.
  published in: Lüneburg, Rudolf (1931). "Das Problem der Irrfahrt ohne Richtungsbeschränkung und die Randwertaufgabe der Potentialtheorie". Mathematische Annalen. 104: 700–738. doi:10.1007/BF01457965. S2CID 122120683.
- Luneburg, Rudolf Karl (1964) [1944]. Written at Providence, Rhode Island. Mathematical Theory of Optics. Berkeley & Los Angeles, California: University of California Press.
- Luneburg, Rudolf Karl (1947). Mathematical Analysis of Binocular Vision. Princeton, US: Princeton University Press.
- Luneburg, Rudolf Karl (1948). Propagation of Electromagnetic Waves. New York, US: New York University.
