= Campbell–Stokes recorder =

Type of sunshine recorder

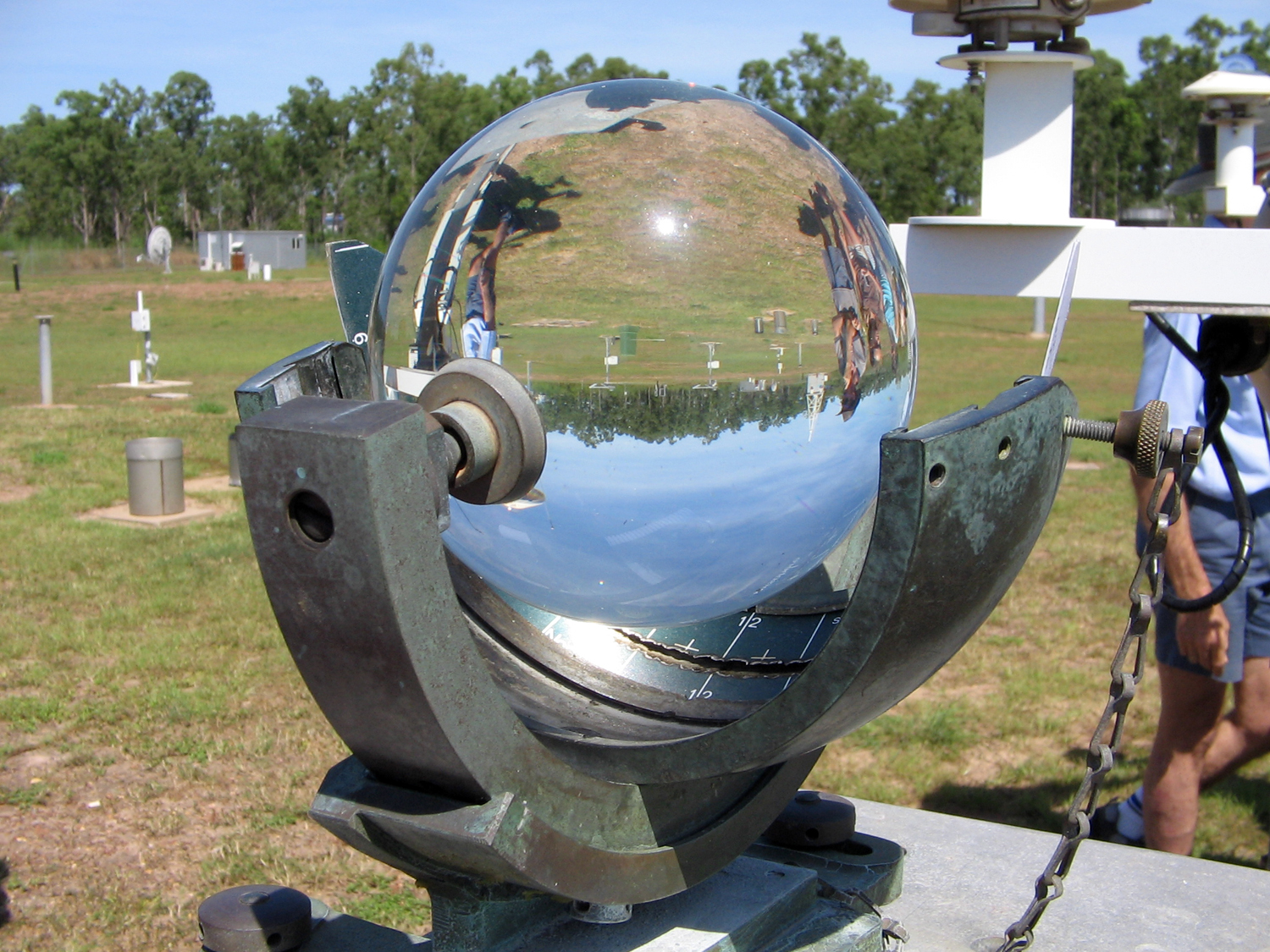
Campbell–Stokes recorder used in a tropical region.

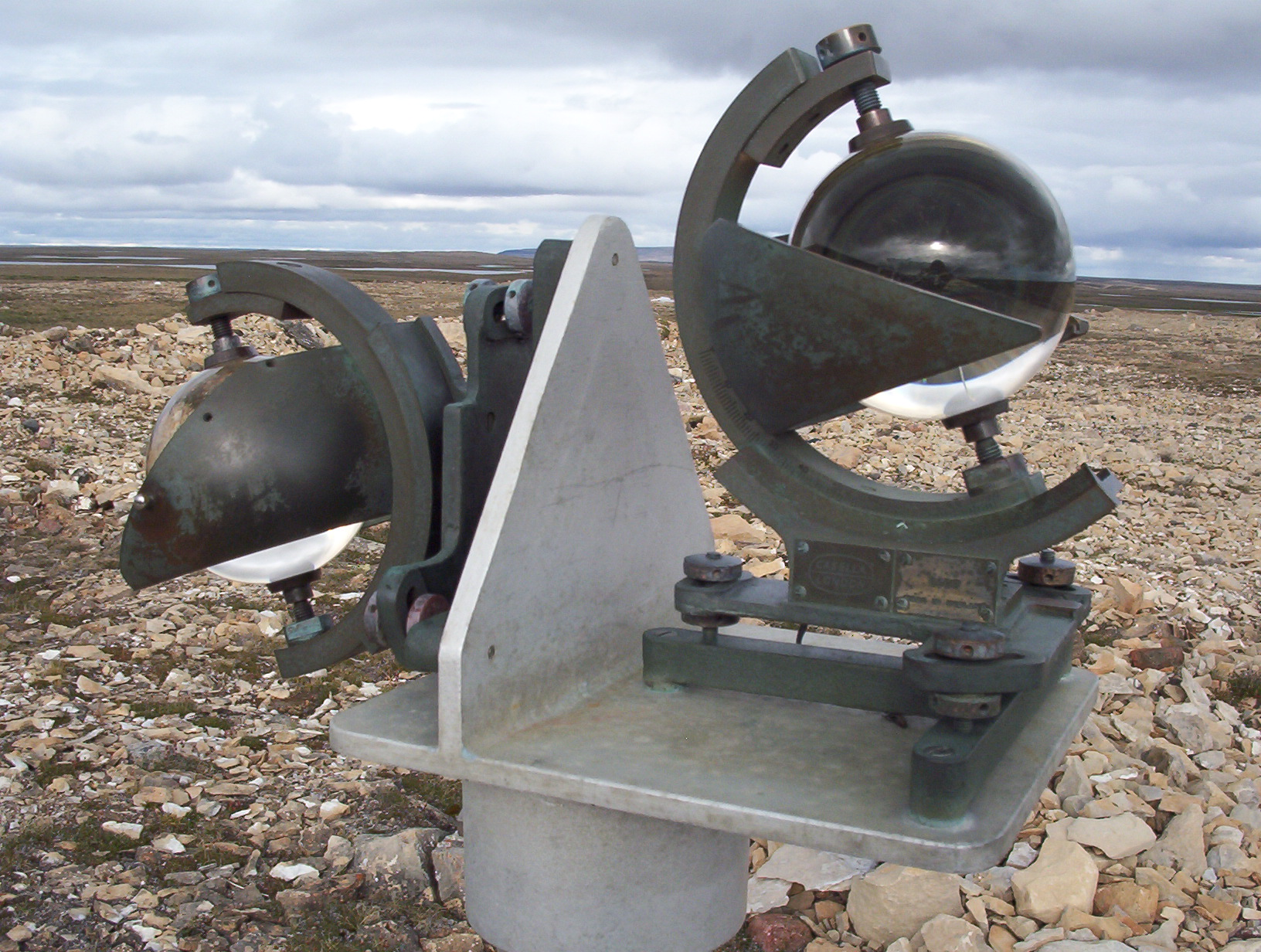
A Campbell–Stokes recorder adapted for use in polar regions (The right sphere is facing south)

The Campbell–Stokes recorder (sometimes called a Stokes sphere) is a type of sunshine recorder. It was invented by John Francis Campbell in 1853 and modified in 1879 by Sir George Gabriel Stokes. The original design by Campbell consisted of large ball lens set into a wooden bowl with the Sun burning a trace on the bowl. Stokes's refinement was to make the housing out of metal and to have a card holder set behind the sphere.

The unit is designed to record how many hours of bright sunshine were experienced on a given day.

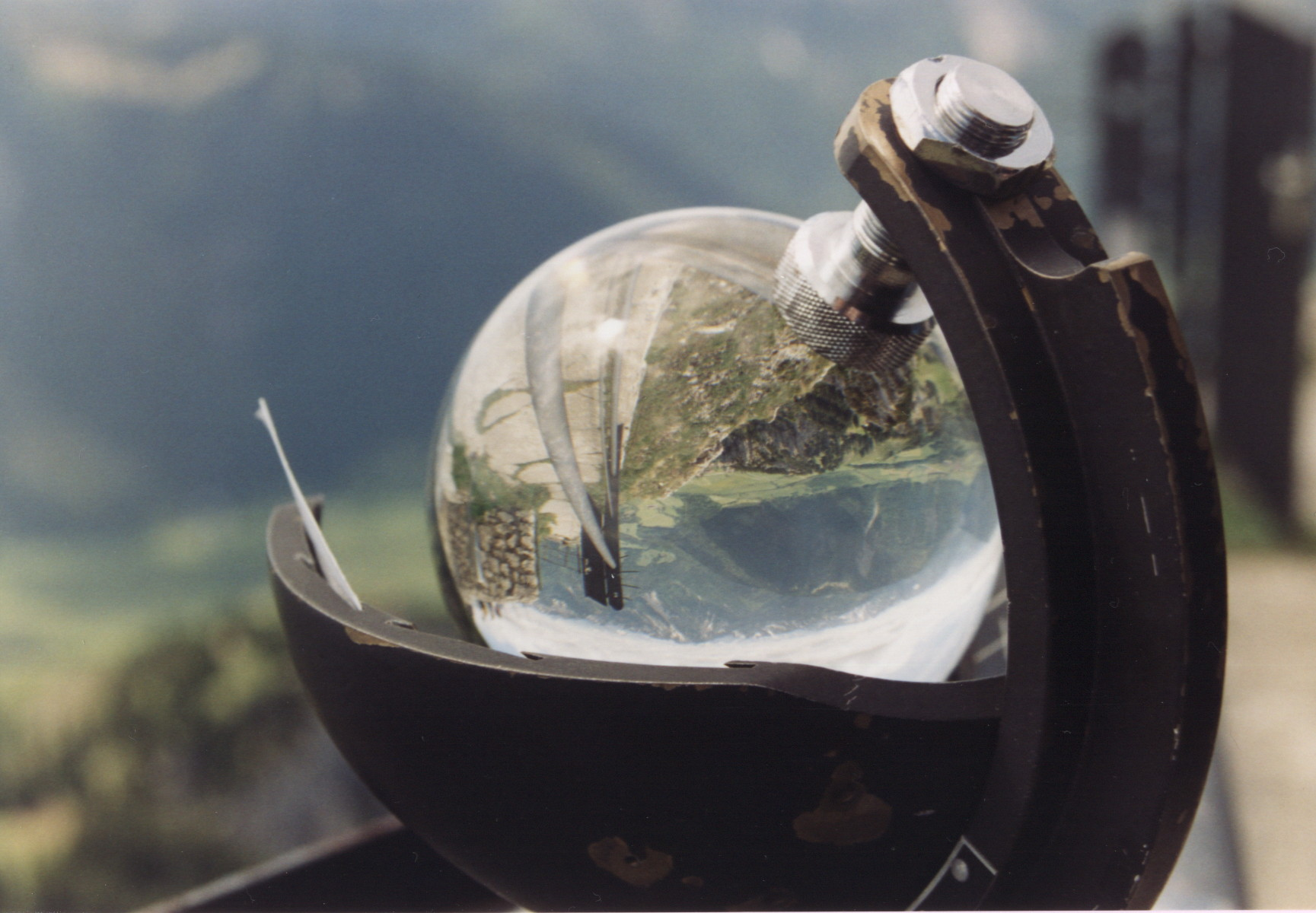
A Campbell–Stokes sunshine recorder

This basic unit is still in use today with very little change. It is widely used outside the United States (the Marvin sunshine recorder is generally the instrument used by the U.S. National Weather Service).

== Technology ==
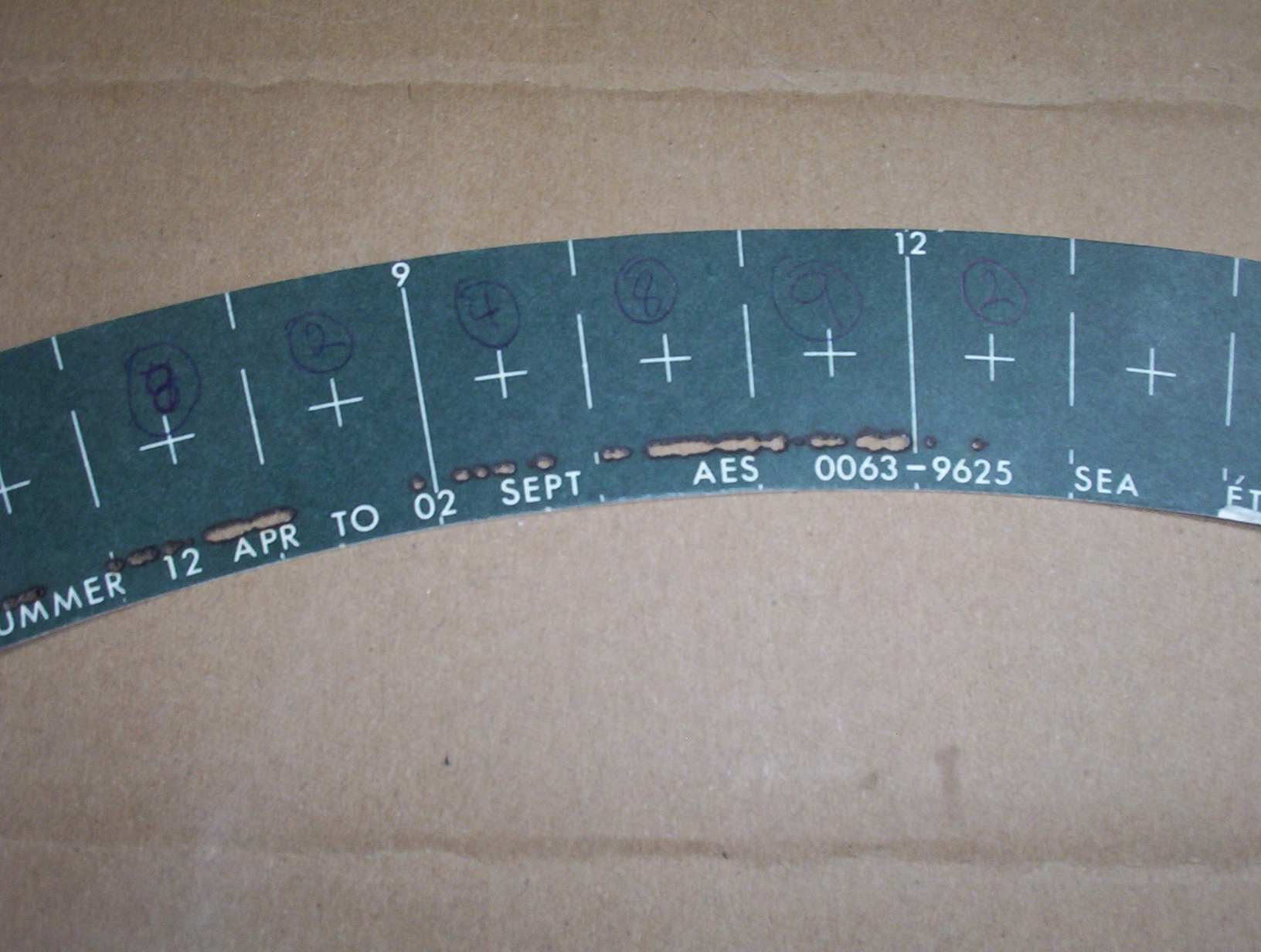
Sunshine card for the Campbell-Stokes recorder

The crystal ball is typically 10 cm (4 inches) in diameter, and is designed to focus the rays from the Sun onto a card mounted at the back and is set on a stand. The card is held in place by grooves of which there are three overlapping sets, to allow for the altitude of the Sun during different seasons of the year. The recording of each day goes onto one card. In the Northern Hemisphere the winter cards are used from 15 October to 29 February, the equinox cards from 1 March to 11 April and 3 September to 14 October. The summer cards are therefore used from 12 April to 2 September. Each card is marked as to the hour, with local noon being in the centre, and is read in tenths.

In the Northern Hemisphere, the unit is set in a stand facing south to enable the maximum amount of Sun to be recorded. It is important to place the unit in an area where the Sun will not be blocked by buildings, trees or flagpoles.

A modification to the standard unit for polar regions is the addition of a second, north facing, sphere and card, to record the sunlight during the summer when it remains in the sky for 24 hours.

== Advantages ==
The major advantage of this type of recorder is its simplicity and ease of use. There are no moving parts and it thus requires very little maintenance. The unit can be used anywhere in the world with little or no modification to the design. Electrically operated pyranometers can do the same work, but the Campbell–Stokes recorder uses solar power.

== Disadvantages ==
When the Sun is low in the sky it may not have enough strength to properly burn the card and thus can only measure the amount of bright sunshine as opposed to visible sunshine. This often occurs at dawn and dusk. Rain may cause the card to be torn when removing it and thus making it difficult to read. In areas of high frost and during periods of freezing rain the sphere may be difficult to clean and may not be removed before the Sun is shining again. It is also susceptible to external, non-weather factors such as dust, dirt or dried bird droppings accumulating on the glass sphere which requires frequent inspection and cleaning.

The single biggest problem is in the reading of the cards. On days when the Sun is alternately covered and exposed by clouds, the amount of burn on the card may be the same for 30 seconds as for 5 minutes. Thus, the reading of the card may differ from one observer to another. Comparisons with automatic instruments at German stations revealed that during summer the differences of the two measurement systems can reach up to 4 h per day. The mean difference was −0.23 h, i.e. the measurements of the Campbell–Stokes recorder are larger than the automatic.
