= Ball lens =

Spherical lens

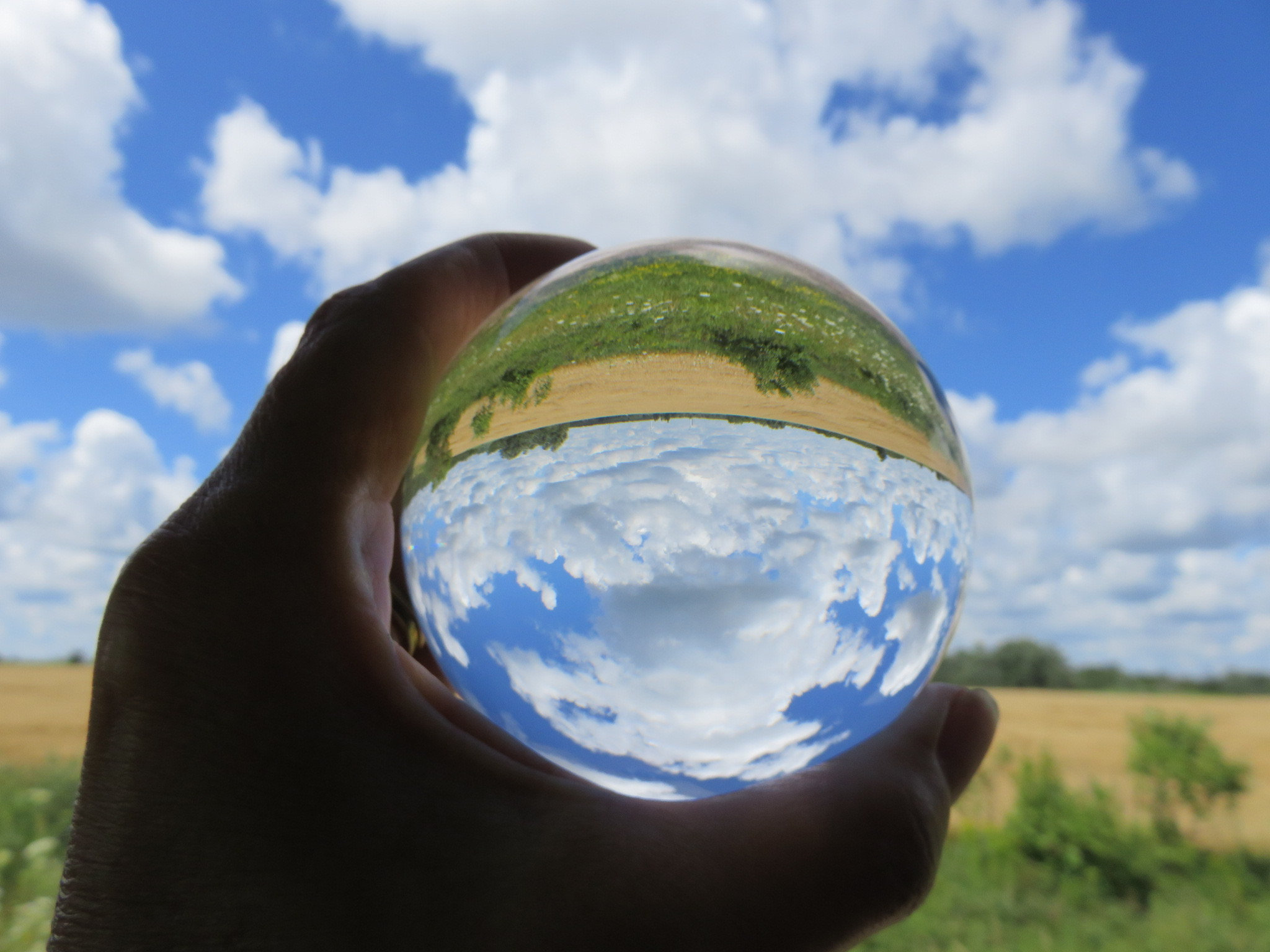
A photograph through a ball lens

A ball lens is an optical lens in the shape of a sphere. Formally, it is a bi-convex spherical lens with the same radius of curvature on both sides, and diameter equal to twice the radius of curvature. The same optical laws may be applied to analyze its imaging characteristics as for other lenses.

As a lens, a transparent sphere of any material with refractive index (n) greater than air (n > 1.00) bends parallel rays of light to a focal point. For most glassy materials the focal point is only slightly beyond the surface of the ball, on the side opposite to where the rays entered. Ball lenses have extremely high optical aberration, including large amounts of coma and field curvature compared to conventional lenses.

Ball lenses or "lensballs" are used by photographers to take novel extreme wide-angle photos.

== Characteristics ==
Characteristics

Where D = lens diameter and n = refractive index,

Effective focal length,	EFL	= nD/(4(n−1))
Back focal length,	BFL	= EFL − D/2
Numerical aperture,	NA	= (2 (n−1))/n

== Optical coupling ==
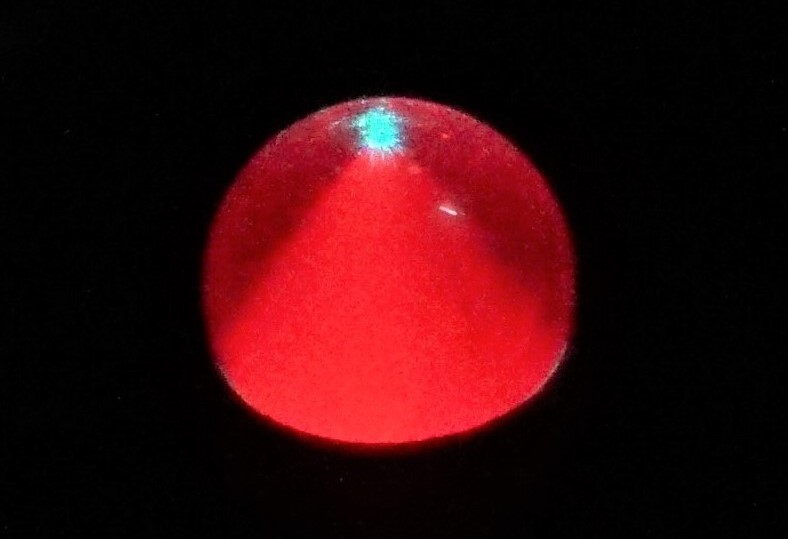
A ruby ball lens atop a green laser pointer. The 520 nm light is absorbed and remitted as red fluorescence, showing how the lens focuses the light into a cone within. Ball lenses are often used to connect optical fibers to light sources.

The first lenses were likely spherical or cylindrical glass containers filled with water, which people noticed had the ability to focus light. Simple convex lenses have surfaces that are small sections of a sphere. A ball lens is just a simple lens where the surfaces' radii of curvature are equal to the radius of the lens itself.

A ball lens refracts light at the interface between its surface and its surroundings. Light from a collimated source is bent into a converging cone. The rays travel in straight lines within the lens, and then are bent again when they exit, converging to a focal point which is typically just outside the ball.

The focal length of a ball lens is a function of its refractive index and its diameter. The effective focal length (EFL) of a ball lens is much larger than the back focal length (BFL), the distance from the back surface of the lens to the focal point. Ball lenses have the shortest possible focal length for a given lens diameter (for a spherical lens). Due to the optical invariant, this allows light from a collimated beam to be focused to smaller diameters than could be achieved with other spherical lenses. Similarly, a point source of light placed at the focal point will produce a collimated beam emanating from the opposite side of the lens, and the lens's large ratio of diameter to focal length (large numerical aperture) allows more light to be captured than would be possible with other spherical lenses. This makes ball lenses particularly suited for coupling light from a laser to a fiber-optic cable or a detector, or from one fiber-optic cable to another, or for micro-optical systems. In addition, ball lenses are omnidirectional, which eases alignment of optical couplings over other types of lens because all that is necessary is to keep everything centered. Ball lenses for optical coupling are typically small, ranging from 5 millimeters down to as tiny as 110 micrometers, with focal lengths ranging from 100 to 250 micrometers. They tend to be made of high-quality optical glass such as borosilicate glass or quartz glass, or crystals such as synthetic sapphire with refractive indices ranging from 1.5 to 1.8. Higher indices produce a shorter focal length for a given size ball.

=== Fiber optics ===
Ball lenses are often used in fiber optics. Due to their short focal lengths and the subsequently small waist diameters they produce in a laser beam, they are ideally suited to focus nearly all of the light from a laser into an optical fiber core. The numerical apertures of the fiber and lens need to match. The fiber can usually be placed in direct contact with the ball, helping to ease alignment.

In addition, a ball lens can be used on the output side of a fiber-optic cable to collimate the output back into a beam. In this way, two lenses placed back to back can be used to couple two cables to one another.

== Microscopy ==
Ball lenses are rarely used for imaging applications due to their high optical aberration. Their very short focal lengths allow them to be used to make very simple microscopes, however. A 3 mm ball lens can magnify an image 100 to 200 times, while a 1 mm ball will produce images 200 to 350 times larger than their actual size. In addition, because they are omnidirectional and have large aperture for their focal length, ball lenses convert such images into Bessel wavefronts, which have reduced diffraction effects and can be imaged in the far field as well as in the near field. In 1677, Antonie van Leeuwenhoek used a small ball lens to create a single-lens microscope with 300× magnification, allowing the first observation of spermatozoa. Ball lenses have found uses in many micro-imaging applications, ranging from electron microscopes to single-lens smart-phone microscopes to nano-microscopy.

== Omnidirectional lens ==
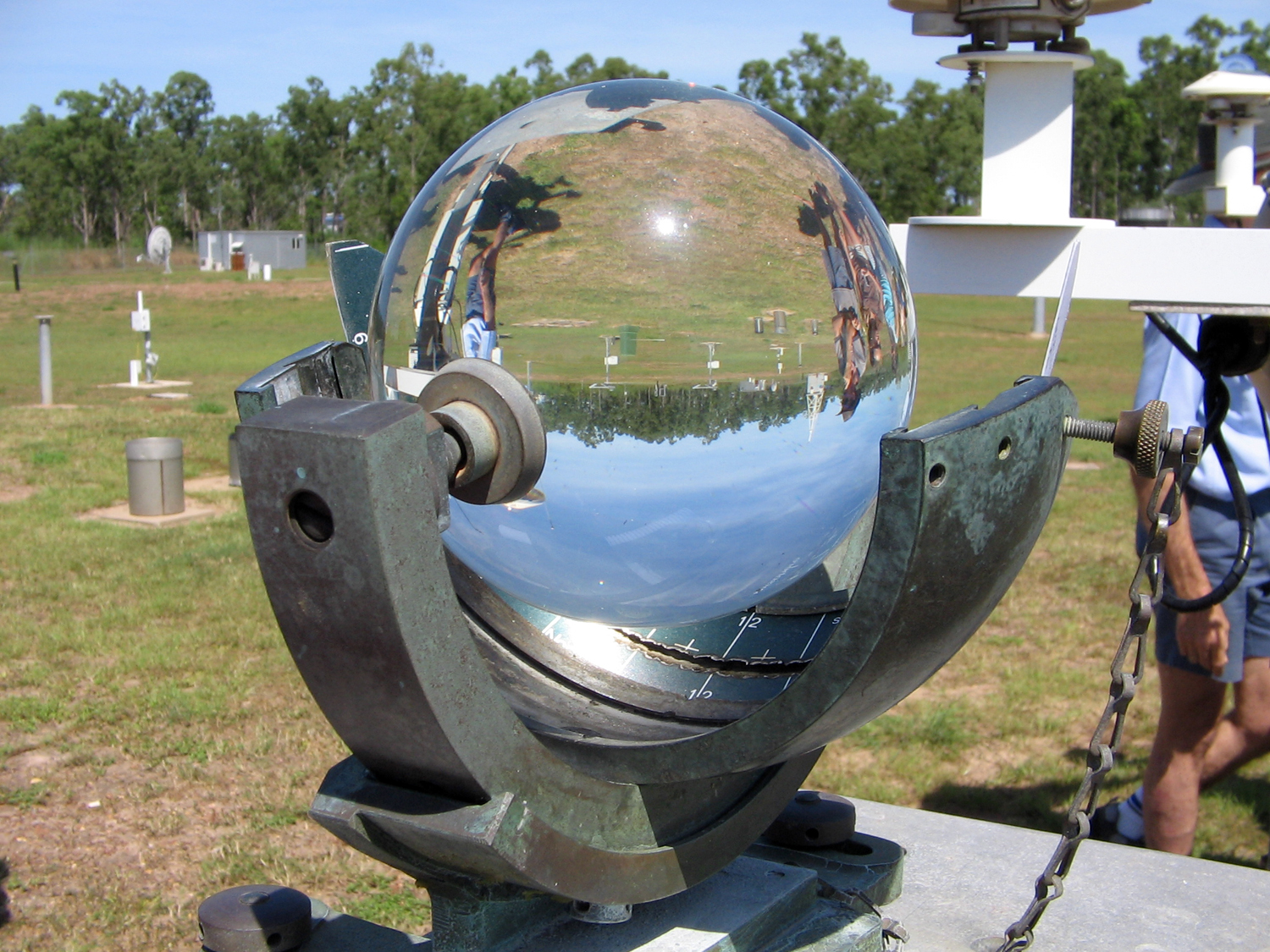
A Campbell–Stokes recorder

Unlike other types of lens, the image-forming properties of a ball lens are omnidirectional (independent of the direction being imaged). This effect is exploited in the Campbell–Stokes recorder, a scientific instrument which records the brightness of sunlight by burning the surface of a paper card bent around the sphere. The device, itself fixed, records the apparent motion and intensity of the sun across the sky, burning an image of the sun's motion across the card.

== Lensball photography ==
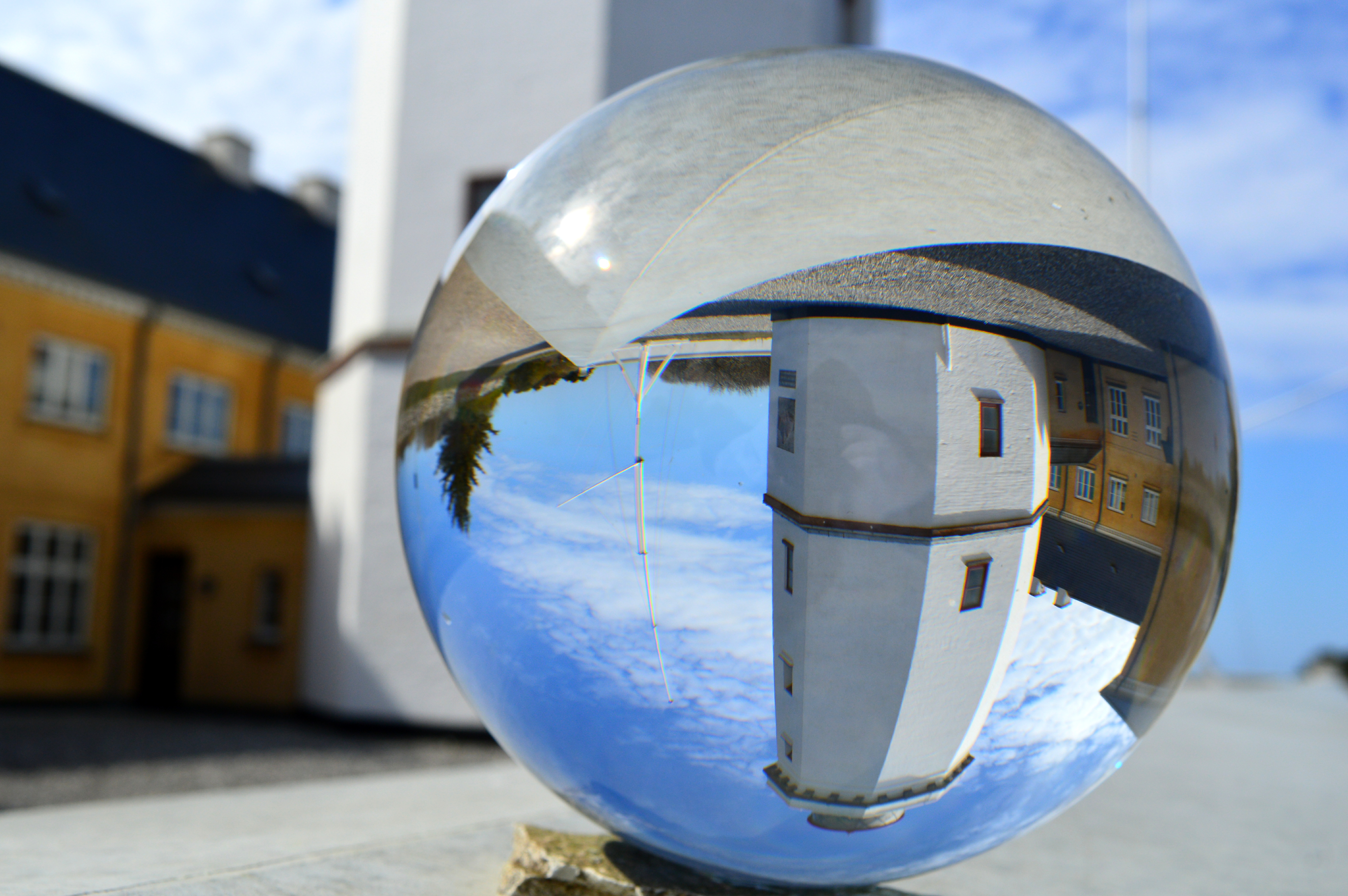
Landscape photograph taken through a lensball

Ball lenses are used by photographers to take novel extreme wide-angle photos. The ball lens is placed fairly close to the camera and the camera's own lenses are used to focus an image through it. The light is focused to a small spot at the output surface of the ball, and reaches its focal point just outside the surface. From there the light diverges, flipping both the right/left and the top/bottom axes. Thus, if the camera is too close to the ball lens, the background around the ball will be completely blurred. The further the camera lies from the ball lens, the better the background will come into focus.

== Special types ==
=== Extremely refractive glass ===
For materials with refractive index greater than 2, objects at infinity form an image inside the sphere. The image is not directly accessible; the closest accessible point is on the sphere's surface directly opposite the source of light. Most clear solids used for making lenses have refractive indices between 1.4 and 1.6; only a few rare materials have a refractive index of 2 or higher (cubic zirconia, boron nitride (c‑BN & w‑BN), diamond, moissanite). Many of those few are either too brittle, too soft, too hard, or too expensive for practical lens making (columbite, rutile, tantalite, tausonite). For a refractive index of exactly 2.0, the image forms on the surface of the sphere.

=== Gradient index ===
A Luneburg lens is a ball lens that has a radially varying index of refraction that follows a certain profile. A Luneberg lens has foci outside the lens and can perfectly image a spherical object. Luneberg lenses designed for radio wavelengths are used in some radar systems and radio antennas.

== See also ==
- Crystal ball
