= Gradient-index optics =

Science of using a material's refractive index for optical effects

A gradient-index lens with a parabolic variation of refractive index (n) with radial distance (x). The lens focuses light in the same way as a conventional lens.

Gradient-index (GRIN) optics is the branch of optics covering optical effects produced by a gradient of the refractive index of a material. Such gradual variation can be used to produce lenses with flat surfaces, or lenses that do not have the aberrations typical of traditional spherical lenses. Gradient-index lenses may have a refraction gradient that is spherical, axial, or radial.

== In nature ==
The lens of the eye is the most obvious example of gradient-index optics in nature. In the human eye, the refractive index of the lens varies from approximately 1.406 in the central layers down to 1.386 in less dense layers of the lens. This allows the eye to image with good resolution and low aberration at both short and long distances.

Another example of gradient-index optics in nature is the common mirage of a pool of water appearing on a road on a hot day. The pool is actually an image of the sky, apparently located on the road since light rays are being refracted (bent) from their normal straight path. This is due to the variation of refractive index between the hot, less dense air at the surface of the road, and the denser cool air above it. The variation in temperature (and thus density) of the air causes a gradient in its refractive index, causing it to increase with height. This index gradient causes refraction of light rays (at a shallow angle to the road) from the sky, bending them into the eye of the viewer, with their apparent location being the road's surface.

The Earth's atmosphere acts as a GRIN lens, allowing observers to see the sun for a few minutes after it is actually below the horizon, and observers can also view stars that are below the horizon. This effect also allows for observation of electromagnetic signals from satellites after they have descended below the horizon, as in radio occultation measurements.

== Applications ==
The ability of GRIN lenses to have flat surfaces simplifies the mounting of the lens, which makes them useful where many very small lenses need to be mounted together, such as in photocopiers and scanners. The flat surface also allows a GRIN lens to be easily optically aligned to a fiber, to produce collimated output, making it applicable for endoscopy as well as for in vivo calcium imaging and optogenetic stimulation in brain.

In imaging applications, GRIN lenses are mainly used to reduce aberrations. The design of such lenses involves detailed calculations of aberrations as well as efficient manufacture of the lenses. A number of different materials have been used for GRIN lenses including optical glasses, plastics, germanium, zinc selenide, and sodium chloride.

Certain optical fibres (graded-index fibres) are made with a radially-varying refractive index profile; this design strongly reduces the modal dispersion of a multi-mode optical fiber. The radial variation in refractive index allows for a sinusoidal height distribution of rays within the fibre, preventing the rays from leaving the core. This differs from traditional optical fibres, which rely on total internal reflection, in that all modes of the GRIN fibres propagate at the same speed, allowing for a higher temporal bandwidth for the fibre.

Antireflection coatings are typically effective for narrow ranges of frequency or angle of incidence. Graded-index materials are less constrained.

An axial gradient lens has been used to concentrate sunlight onto solar cells, capturing as much as 90% of incident light when the sun is not at an optimal angle.

== Manufacture ==
GRIN lenses are made by several techniques:

- Neutron irradiation – Boron-rich glass is bombarded with neutrons to cause a change in the boron concentration, and thus the refractive index of the lens.
- Chemical vapour deposition – Involving the deposition of different glass with varying refractive indexes, onto a surface to produce a cumulative refractive change.
- Partial polymerisation – An organic monomer is partially polymerized using ultraviolet light at varying intensities to give a refractive gradient.
- Ion exchange – Glass is immersed into a liquid melt with lithium ions. As a result of diffusion, sodium ions in the glass are partially exchanged with lithium ones, with a larger amount of exchange occurring at the edge. Thus the sample obtains a gradient material structure and a corresponding gradient of the refractive index.
- Ion stuffing – Phase separation of a specific glass causes pores to form, which can later be filled using a variety of salts or concentration of salts to give a varying gradient.
- Direct laser writing – While point-by-point exposing the pre-designed structure an exposure dose is varied (scanning speed, laser power, etc.). This corresponds to spatially tunable monomer-to-polymer degree-of-conversion resulting to a different refractive index. The method is applicable to free-form micro-optical elements and multi-component optics.

== History ==
In 1854, J C Maxwell suggested a lens whose refractive index distribution would allow for every region of space to be sharply imaged. Known as the Maxwell fisheye lens, it involves a spherical index function and would be expected to be spherical in shape as well. This lens, however, is impractical to make and has little usefulness since only points on the surface and within the lens are sharply imaged and extended objects suffer from extreme aberrations. In 1905, R. W. Wood used a dipping technique creating a gelatin cylinder with a refractive index gradient that varied symmetrically with the radial distance from the axis. Disk-shaped slices of the cylinder were later shown to have plane faces with radial index distribution. He showed that even though the faces of the lens were flat, they acted like converging and diverging lens depending on whether the index was a decreasing or increasing relative to the radial distance. In 1964, a posthumous book of R. K. Luneburg was published in which he described a lens that focuses incident parallel rays of light onto a point on the opposite surface of the lens. This also limited the applications of the lens because it was difficult to use it to focus visible light; however, it had some usefulness in microwave applications. Some years later several new techniques have been developed to fabricate lenses of the Wood type. Since then at least the thinner GRIN lenses can possess surprisingly good imaging properties considering their very simple mechanical construction, while thicker GRIN lenses found application e.g. in SELFOC rods, which are used as relay lenses in endoscopes.

== Theory ==
An inhomogeneous gradient-index lens possesses a refractive index whose change follows the function $n=f(x,y,z)$ of the coordinates of the region of interest in the medium. According to Fermat's principle, the light path integral (L), taken along a ray of light joining any two points of a medium, is stationary relative to its value for any nearby curve joining the two points. The light path integral is given by the equation

$L=\int_{S_o}^{S}n\,ds$, where n is the refractive index and S is the arc length of the curve. If Cartesian coordinates are used, this equation is modified to incorporate the change in arc length for a spherical gradient, to each physical dimension:
$$L=\int_{S_o}^{S}n(x,y,z)\sqrt{x'^{2}+y'^{2}+z'^{2}}\, ds$$

where prime corresponds to d/ds. The light path integral is able to characterize the path of light through the lens in a qualitative manner, such that the lens may be easily reproduced in the future.

The refractive index gradient of GRIN lenses can be mathematically modelled according to the method of production used. For example, GRIN lenses made from a radial gradient-index material, such as SELFOC Microlens, have a refractive index that varies according to:

$n_{r}=n_{o}\left ( 1-\frac{A r^2}{2} \right )$, where n_{r} is the refractive index at a distance, r, from the optical axis; n_{o} is the design index on the optical axis, and A is a positive constant.

== See also ==
- Graded-index fiber
