= Jordan sunshine recorder =

19th century sunshine recorder

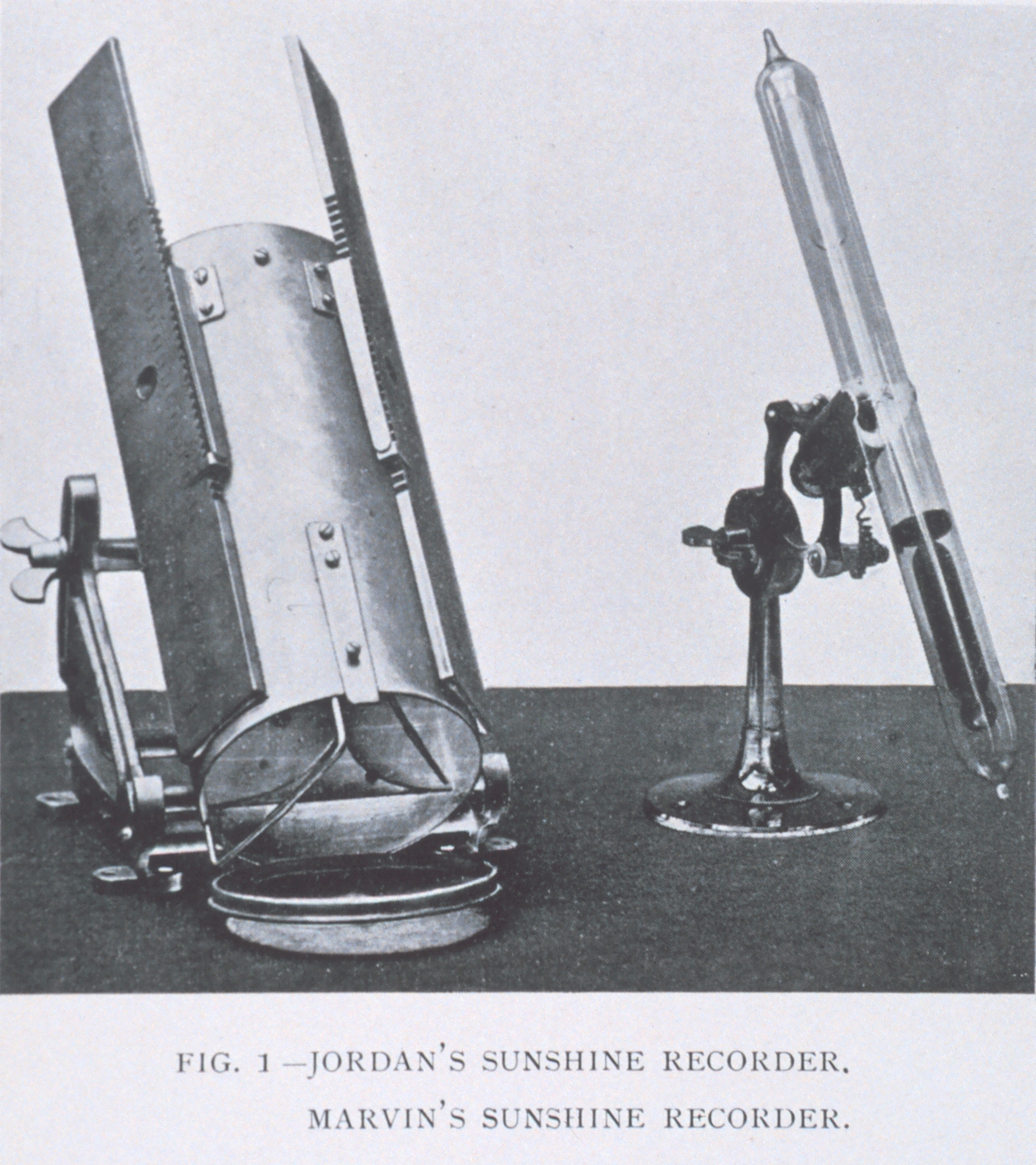
A Jordan sunshine recorder (left). The other instrument is a Marvin sunshine recorder.

A Jordan sunshine recorder is a type of sunshine recorder invented in the 19th century by T. B. Jordan with later modifications by his son, J. B. Jordan. The device consists of a cylinder with two small apertures through which sunlight can pass. Two sheets of photosensitive paper are placed inside the cylinder and the recorder is positioned in such a way that the sunlight falling through the apertures leaves a path on the paper as the sun moves through the sky during the day. The Jordan recorder was criticized as producing less consistent results than the Campbell–Stokes recorder due to difficulty in precisely interpreting the sun paths recorded.
