= Perforene =

Trademark for graphene membranes

In March 2013, Lockheed Martin announced that it was developing a family of membranes made from graphene, under the trademark Perforene. The most promising application was seawater desalination. With holes, claimed as small as one nanometer in diameter, the membranes were supposed to stop sodium, chloride and other ions, while allowing water molecules to pass through easily. Performance expectations, relative to the use of reverse osmosis membranes, were optimist:

- Up to 5x increase in flux across the membrane
- Fouling reduction of up to 80%
- Approximately 100 x less energy and pressure required (this claim was reported by Reuters. However, the Lockheed Martin's current product datasheet predicted a more modest reduction in energy consumption: only 10–20%.)

In addition to the desalination industry, Lockheed Martin planned to market Perforene variants in the following fields:

- Waste water treatment
- Pharmaceutical material harvest and purification
- Energy/power generation
- Mining
- Food and beverage
- Manufacturing

The product was not expected to be released until 2020.

== Media reaction ==
Bruce Sterling commented for Wired, "if this graphene vaporware actually worked out in practice, we’d have to forgive Lockheed Martin for everything else they’ve ever done — plus maybe even give them Nobels and McMansion palaces in former deserts."

The Water Desalination Report evaluated Lockheed Martin's claims that it had developed a membrane that would desalinate water “at a fraction of the cost of industry-standard RO systems” as "ridiculous and very premature."
