= Marvin sunshine recorder =

Meteorological instrument

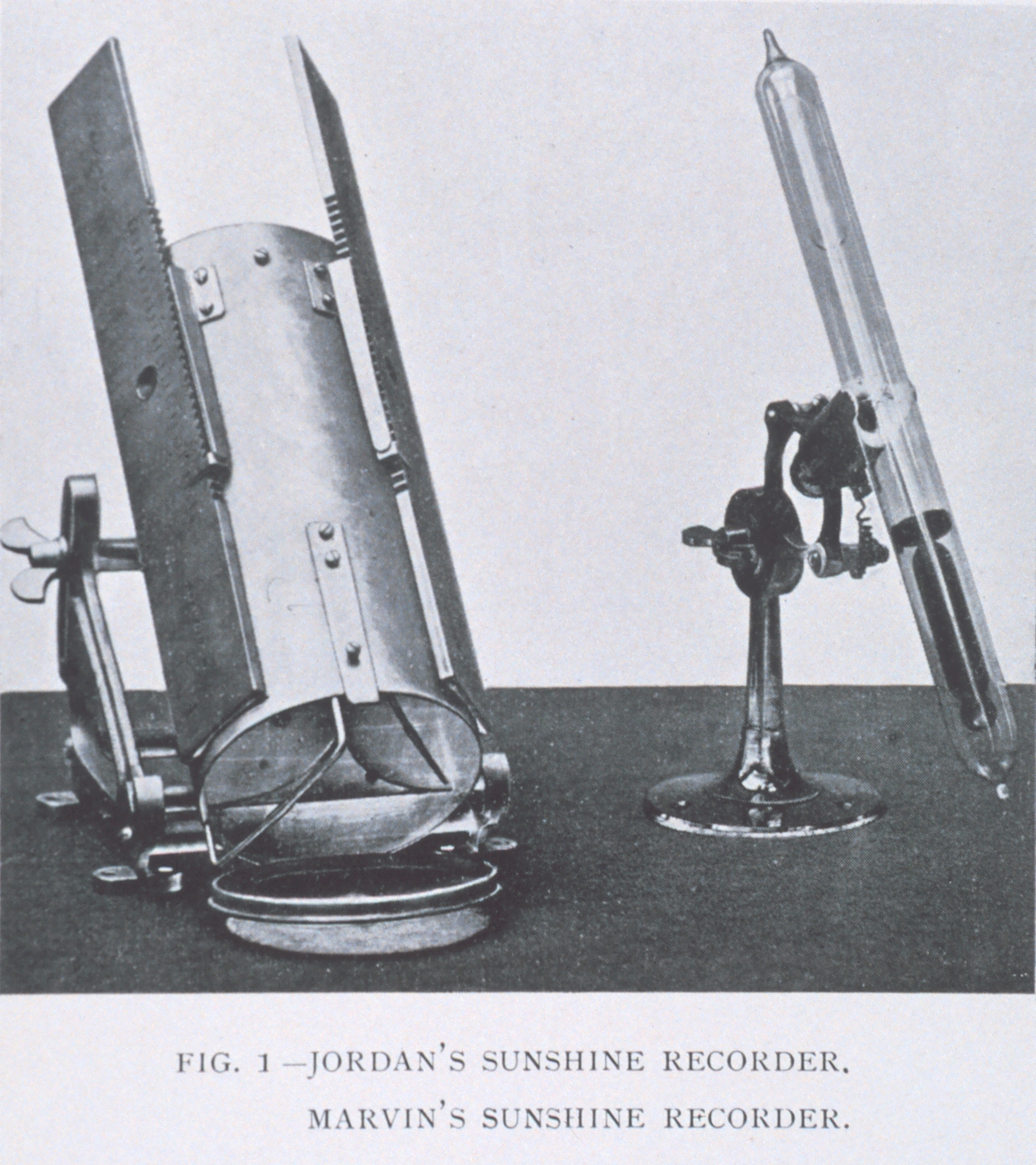
A Marvin sunshine recorder (right). The other instrument is a Jordan sunshine recorder.

A Marvin sunshine recorder is a sunshine recorder which uses a clock type mechanism to record the Sun.
