= Sunshine recorder =

Meteorological instrumentation

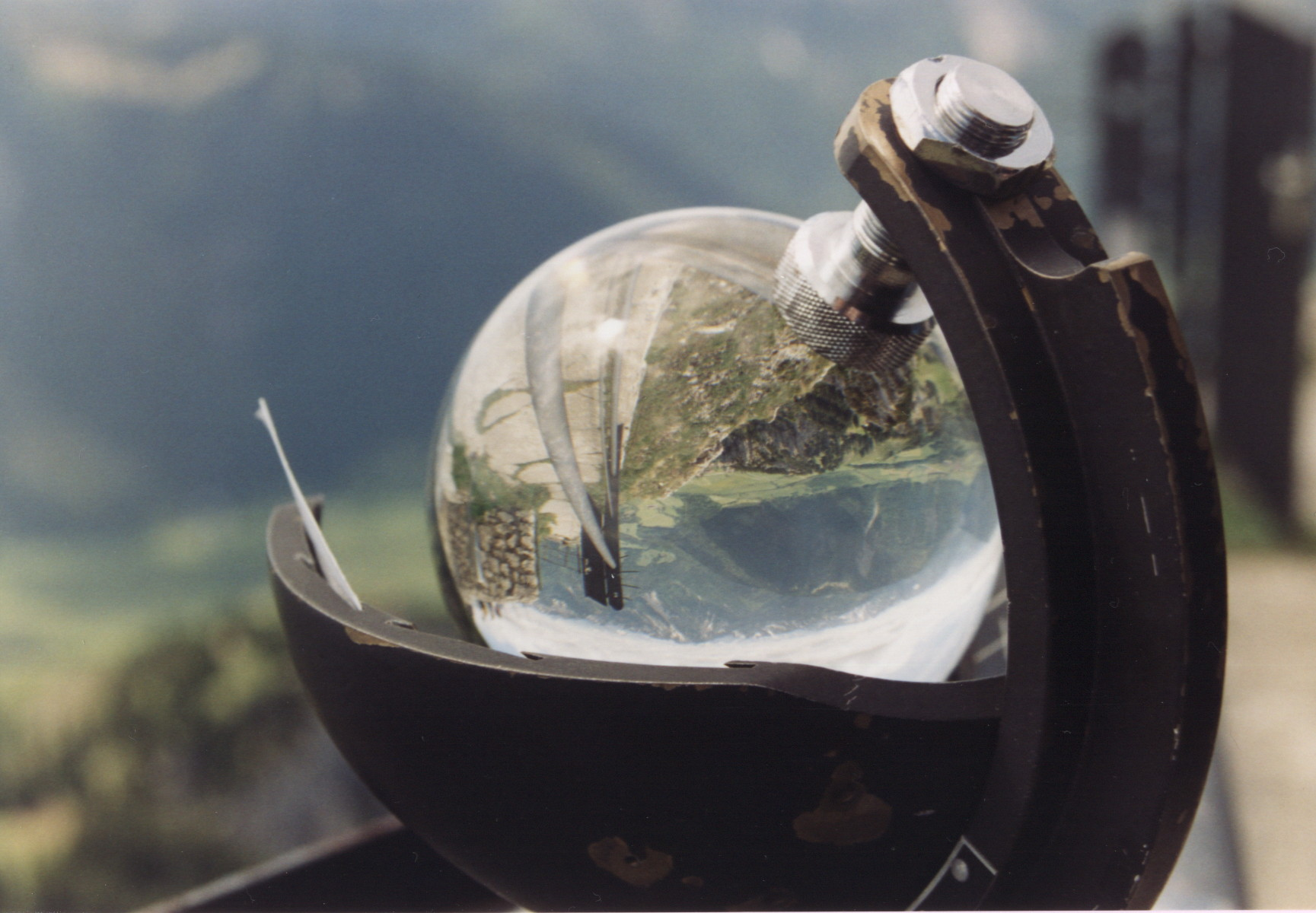
A Campbell–Stokes sunshine recorder

A sunshine recorder is a device that records the amount of sunshine at a given location or region at any time. The results provide information about the weather and climate as well as the temperature of a geographical area. This information is useful in meteorology, science, agriculture, tourism, and other fields.

There are two basic types of sunshine recorders. One type uses the Sun itself as a time-scale for the sunshine readings. The other type uses some form of clock for the time scale.

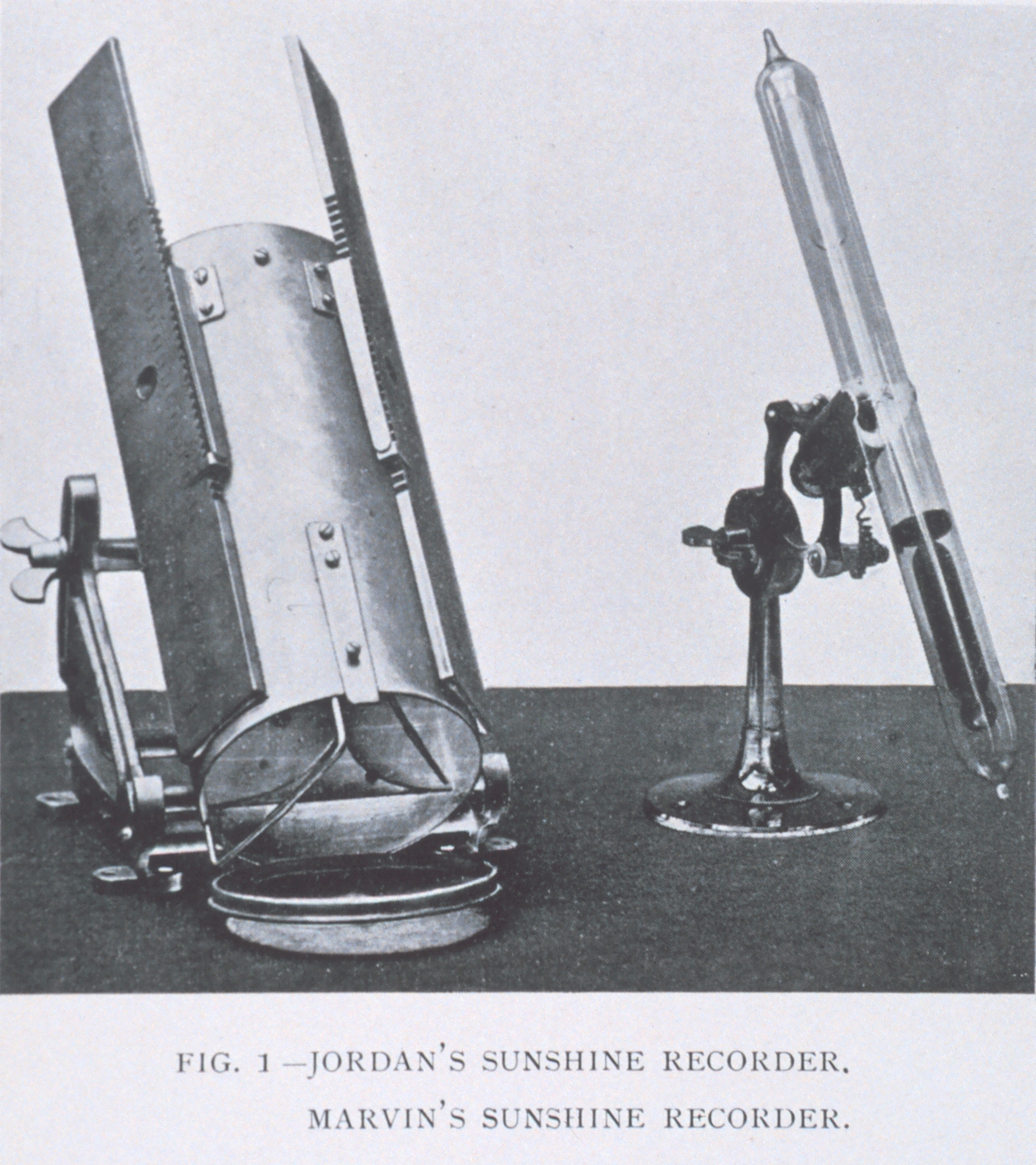
A Jordan sunshine recorder (left). The other instrument is a Marvin sunshine recorder.

Older recorders required a human observer to interpret the results; recorded results might differ among observers. Modern sunshine recorders use electronics and computers for precise data that do not depend on a human interpreter. Newer recorders can also measure the global and diffuse radiation.

== Examples ==
- A Campbell–Stokes recorder has a glass sphere that focuses the Sun's rays on a card behind it to produce a continuous scorch mark, which meteorologists can use to calculate the number of hours of bright sunlight.
