= Theatrum Chemicum =

Compendium of early alchemical writings

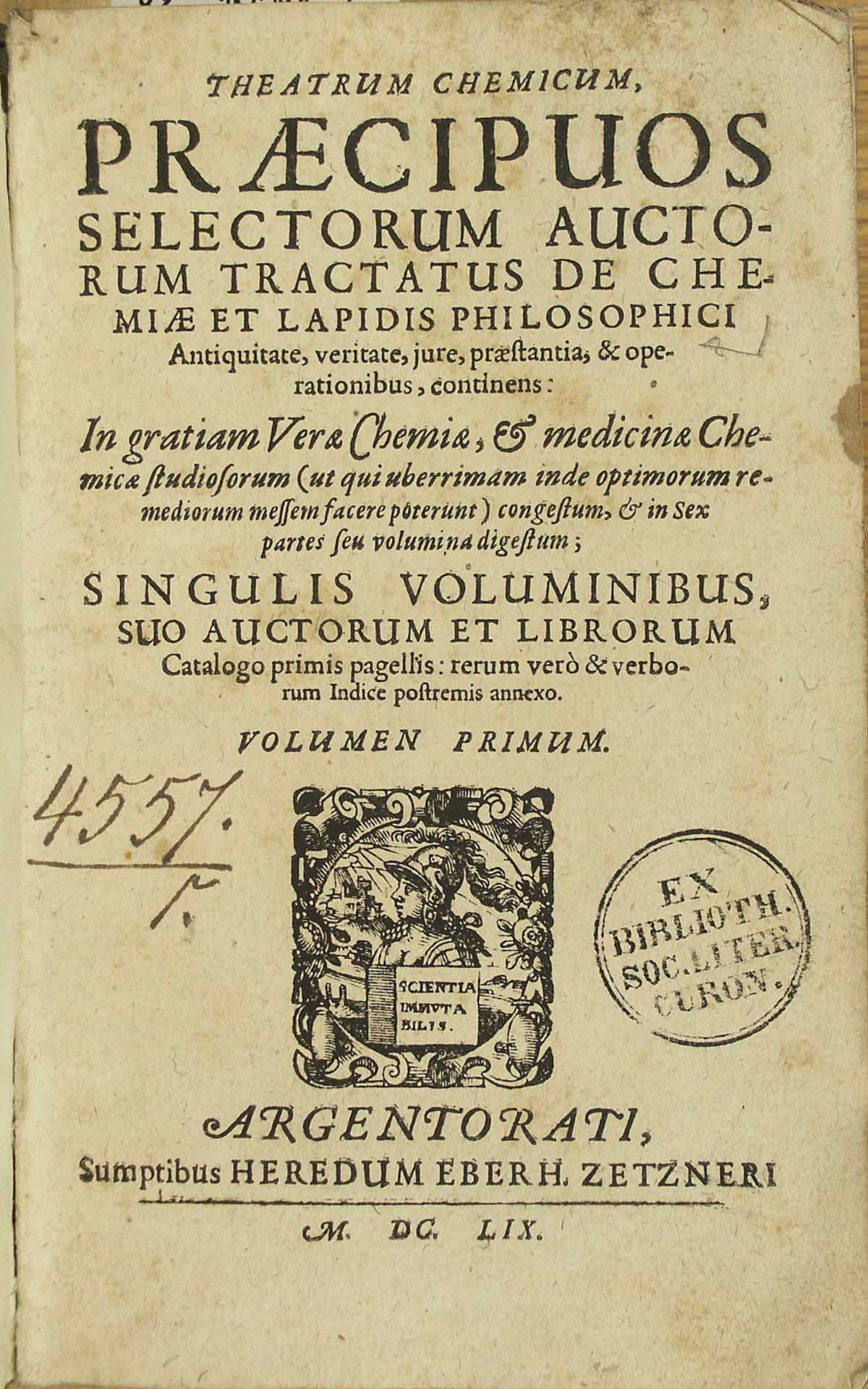
Page One of Theatrum Chemicum Volume I. Published 1602, Oberursel by Lazarus Zetzner.

Theatrum Chemicum ("Chemical Theatre") is a compendium of early alchemical writings published in six volumes over the course of six decades. The first three volumes were published in 1602, while the final sixth volume was published in its entirety in 1661. Theatrum Chemicum remains the most comprehensive collective work on the subject of alchemy ever published in the Western world.

The full title of the work is Theatrum Chemicum, præcipuos selectorum auctorum tractatus de Chemiæ et Lapidis Philosophici Antiquitate, veritate, jure præstantia, et operationibus continens in gratiam veræ Chemiæ et Medicinæ Chemicæ Studiosorum (ut qui uberrimam unde optimorum remediorum messem facere poterunt) congestum et in quatuor partes seu volumina digestum, (Note: Roughly translated as "Chemical Theatre, for a particularly selected person responsible for handling about Chemicals and the Philosopher's Stone. Ancient, truthful, pure, excellent, and working, containing: An account of True Chemicals, and the study of Medical Chemicals (how to most fruitfully accomplish the best remedy) brought together as parts in arrangement.) though later volumes express slightly modified titles. For the sake of brevity, the work is most often referred to simply as Theatrum Chemicum.

All volumes of the work, with exception of the last two volumes, were published by Lazarus Zetzner in Oberursel and Strasbourg, France. The final two volumes were published posthumously by Zetzner's heirs, who continued to use his name for publication purposes.

The volumes are in actuality a collection of previously published and unpublished alchemical treatises, essays, poems, notes, and writings from various sources, some of which are attributed to known writers and others remain anonymous. Despite Zetzner acting primarily as publisher and editor, many of the contents are not believed to have been written by him. However, because the Theatrum Chemicum was more widely disseminated in comparison to most alchemical texts of the era, and its text was in the universal Latin used by most scholars of the time, Zetzner is often cited as the author of many early alchemical texts which he in fact did not compose.

== History ==
Theatrum Chemicum developed as an evolution of previous alchemical printing projects dating back as early as 1475, when a handful of writings believed to have been written by Geber (or pseudo-Geber) were printed with attached alchemical poems and circulated in the area of Venice, and then a decade later in Rome.

A more directly related ancestor of Theatrum Chemicum was a publication by Johannes Petreius entitled "De Alchemia", a work which contained ten alchemical tracts, which was published in Nuremberg in 1541. Petreius had been collecting alchemical documents with the intention of publishing a more complete compilation, though he never completed this task. Upon Petreius's death his collection came into the possession of his relative, Heinrich Petri of Basel who published it in cooperation with Pietro Perna and Guglielmo Gratarolo in 1561. By this time the collection had accrued a total of 53 texts and was published under the name, Verae alchemiae artisque metallicae, citra aenigmata, doctrina. Though Petri would continue to publish alchemical works, it was his partner Perna who in 1572 published an entire series of expanded publications totaling seven volumes with over 80 texts. Perna intended to include the collection of his son-in-law, Konrad Waldkirch, in an even larger multi-volume series, but instead sold the collection to Lazarus Zetzner. Zetzner would publish the newly acquired 80 texts and those of Waldkirch as the first volumes of Theatrum Chemicum. Over the course of the six volumes of Theatrum Chemicum, Zetzner expanded the collection to include over 200 alchemical tracts.

== Publication ==
Lazarus Zetzner (L. Zetzneri) published the Theatrum Chemicum in unsystematic editions, instead he reprinted issues of previous volumes that had appeared up to the date of the particular volume of Theatrum Chemicum as it was published.

The material is diverse, being intended as a single body of work containing all significant alchemical texts of its time. Though the Theatrum Chemicum is a book about alchemy, by its contemporary standards it represented a body of work that, in a modern context, is similar to texts such as The Handbook of Chemistry & Physics, The Physicians' Desk Reference, or other specialized texts for the practice and study of the sciences and philosophy, including medicine. The physician and philosopher Sir Thomas Browne possessed a copy, while Isaac Newton filled the margins of his copy with annotations.

Within the various volumes are found some of the most studied works in the field of alchemy, such as Turba Philosophorum, Arcanum Philosophorum, Cabala Chemica, De Ovo Philosophorum, many tracts focused upon Secretum Secretorum, The Philosopher's Stone, the Elixir of Life, the Tabula Smaragdina, and several works attributed to Albertus Magnus and Thomas Aquinas. The original publication dates of the specific writings found in the Theatrum Chemicum range from just a few years prior to each volume's publication, to as far back as several centuries in some cases.

== Contents ==
Establishing a precise table of contents for the various volumes of Theatrum Chemicum is an issue of debate amongst scholars. Because of the unstandardized nature of early publication practices and the reprinting of tracts from earlier editions, sometimes under their modified full "elenchus" titles, those studying the contents of Theatrum Chemicum often encounter discrepancies in format, tract title, page number, and in some cases even authorship. For example, it is not clear whether some tracts that appear anonymous are in fact uniquely authored, or intended to be attributed to the author of the preceding text.

Some of the authorship proposed by Zetzner remains unverifiable due to the nature of publication, the various age of the works, and the practice of attributing authorship without modern methods of citation. Considering the esoteric nature of the subject matter, this was not uncommon at the time of Theatrum Chemicum's publication, but it does seem clear that Zetzner established the authorship of the various tracts according to his original source material.

Below is a list of the tracts found within Theatrum Chemicum, and their authors as established by Zetzner.

=== Volumes I-III ===
The first three volumes of Theatrum Chemicum were published in 1602. Volume I was published in Oberursel, while the subsequent volumes were published in Strasbourg. The first three volumes increased the number of tracts in each volume to the total of 88 in all.

==== Vol. I ====
- Lazarus Zetznerus, (Epistola dedicatoria) (Introduction)
- Elenchus auctorum et tractatuum primae partis (Table of Contents)
- Robertus Vallensis, (Note: A.K.A. Robert Duval, see Theatrum Chemicum Electronicum) De veritate et antiquitate artis chemicae
  - Libellus qui Testamentum Arnaldi a Villa Nova inscribitur
  - Evidens et manifesta artis chemicae comprobatio. Ex Petri Apiani Antiquitatibus desumpta
- Johannes Chrysippus Fanianus, De arte metallicae metamorphoseos ad Philoponum
- Johannes Chrysippus Fanianus, De jure artis alchemiae, hoc est, variorum authorum, et praesertim iurisconsultorum, judicia et responsa ad quaestionem quotidianam: An alchimia sit ars legitima
- Thomas Mufett, De jure et praestantia chemicorum medicamentorum. Dialogus apologeticus
  - Epistola dedicatoria
  - Epistola ad lectorem
  - De jure et praestantia chemicorum medicamentorum. Dialogus apologeticus
- Thomas Mufett, Epistolae quinque medicinales
- Theobaldus de Hoghelande Mittelburgensis, (Note: A.K.A. Theobald van Hoghelande, see Theatrum Chemicum Electronicum) De alchemiae difficultatibus liber
  - Proemium
  - De alchemiae difficultatibus liber
- Gerard Dorn, Clavis totius philosophiae chemisticae per quam potissima philosophorum dicta reserantur
  - Epistola exhortativa
  - Artis chemisticae
- Gerardus Dorn, Speculativae philosophiae gradus septem vel decem continens, per quos ad sublimia patet aditus
  - Ad lectorem
  - De speculativa philosophia
- Gerardus Dorn, De artificio supernaturali
  - Praefatio
  - Artificium supernaturale
- Gerardus Dorn, De naturae luce physica ex Genesi desumpta, iuxta sententiam Theophrasti Paracelsi (in quo continetur), Physica Genesis; Physica Hermetis; Physica Hermetis Trismegisti, (Tabula Smaragdina); Physica Trithemii; Philosophia meditativa; Philosophia chemica
  - Argumentum totius opusculi
  - Exclamatio auctoris ad Deum
  - Creatio mundi ex narratione Moysis in Genesis Physica Genesis
  - De medio spagirico dispositionis, ad adeptae philosophiae veram cognitionem, et lucii naturae purum conspectum (Physica Trismegisti)
  - De spagirico artificio 10. Trithemii sententia (Physica Trithemii)
  - De philosophia meditativa
  - De philosophia chemica ad meditativam comparata
- Gerardus Dorn, De tenebris contra naturam et vita brevis
  - De duello animi cum corpore
  - De lapidum preciosorum structura (Gemmarum structura)
- Gerardus Dorn, Congeries Paracelsicae chemiae de transmutationibus metallorum
  - Praefatio ad lectorem
  - De transmutationibus metallorum
- Gerardus Dorn, De genealogia mineralium atque metallorum omnium (ex Paracelso)
- Bernardus G. Penotus, Tractatus varii, de vera praeparatione et usu medicamentorum chemicorum
  - Praefatio
  - De medicamentis chemicis
- Bernardus Trevisanus, (Note: ed. Gerard Dorn, see Theatrum Chemicum Electronicum) De alchemia liber (De chymico miraculo)
- Dionysius Zacharias, (Note: possible A.K.A. Johannes Cerasius,(ed. Gerard Dorn), see Theatrum Chemicum Electronicum) Opusculum philosophiae naturalis metallorum
  - Ad lectorem
  - Opusculum
- Annotationes Nicolai Flamelli
  - Annotata quaedam ex Nicolao Flamello (Summarium philosophicum)
  - Aliae quaedam annotationes ex variis autoribus
  - Collectanea quaedam ex antiquis scriptoribus
  - Collectanea ex Democrito; ex multorum opinionibus autorum
- Index rerum et verborum in primo tomo (Index)

==== Vol. II ====
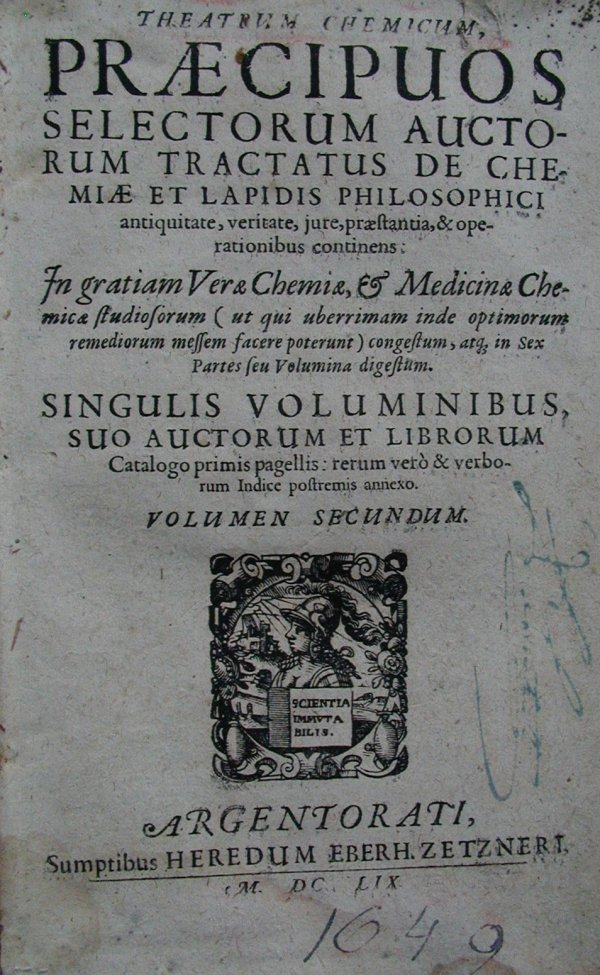
Page One of Theatrum Chemicum Volume II. Originally published 1602, Strasbourg by Lazarus Zetzner.

- Elenchus auctorum et tractatuum secundae partis (Table of Contents)
- Bernard Gilles Penot, Praefatio
- Gaston Claveus, (Note: A.K.A. Gaston LeDoux de Claves, edited by Bernard Gilles Penot, see Theatrum Chemicum Electronicum) Apologia argyropoeiae et chrysopoeiae adversus Thomam Erastum
- Aegidius de Vadis, (Note: A.K.A. Gilles Dewes, edited by Bernard Gilles Penot, see Theatrum Chemicum Electronicum) Dialogus inter naturam et filium philosophiae
  - Bernard Gilles Penot, Praefatio
  - Auctoris praefatio
  - Dialogus philosophiae
  - Tabula inserenda ante prologum lib. 12. portarum Georgii Ripley (Philosophi artem potius occultare conati sunt quam patefacere)
- George Ripley, (Note: edited by Bernard Gilles Penot, see Theatrum Chemicum Electronicum) Duodecim portarum epitome, duobus modis concinnata
  - Prologus
  - Duodecim portarum axiomata philosophica
  - Compendium Alberti Magni, (Note: edited by Bernard Gilles Penot, see Theatrum Chemicum Electronicum citation) de ortu et metallorum materia, supra quam Spagyricus radicalia principia fundet
- Johann Isaac Hollandus, Fragmentum de lapide philosophorum
- Bernard Gilles Penot, Quaestiones et responsiones philosophicae
- Bernard Gilles Penot, Regulae seu canones philosophici LVII (Note: translated roughly as "Rules or Canonical Philosophy (in relation to The Philosopher's Stone, see Theatrum Chemicum Electronicum citation))
- Bernard Gilles Penot, Mercurii, sive argenti vivi ex auro vera extractio cum sua historia
- Chrysorrhoas, sive de arte chemica dialogus
- Josephus Quercetanus, (Note: A.K.A. Joseph Duchesne, see Theatrum Chemicum Electronicum) Ad Jacobi Auberti Vendonis de ortu et causis metallorum contra chemicos explicationem brevis responsio
  - Ad Jacobi Auberti Vindonis de ortu et causis metallorum contra chemicos explicationem responsio
- John Dee, Monas hieroglyphica mathematice, magice, cabalistice, anagogiceque explicata
  - Praefatio ad regem Maximilianum
  - Ad typographum
  - Monas hieroglyphica
- Lorenzo Ventura, De ratione conficiendi lapidis philosophici liber
- Giovanni Francesco Pico della Mirandola, Opus aureum De auro tum aestimando, tum conficiendo, tum utendo, ad conjugem
- Roger Bacon, De alchemia libellus, cui titulum fecit, Speculum alchemiae
- Richardus Anglicus, Libellus utilissimus (peri chemeias), cui titulum fecit Correctorium
- Libellus alius (peri chemeias) utilissimus, et rerum metallicarum cognitione refertissimus, Rosarius minor inscriptus, incerti quidem, sed harum tamen rerum non imperiti auctoris
- Albertus Magnus, De alchemia
  - Scriptum super arborem Aristotelis
- Giovanni Agostino Panteo, Ars et theoria transmutationis metallicae, cum Voarchadumia, proportionibus, numeris et iconibus rei accommodis illustrata
- Giovanni Agostino Panteo, Voarchadumia contra alchemiam ars distincta ab Archemia et Sophia
  - Dedicatio
  - Auctoris intentio
  - Portio prima
  - Portio secunda
  - Portio tertia
- Index rerum et verborum secundi voluminis (Index)

==== Vol. III ====
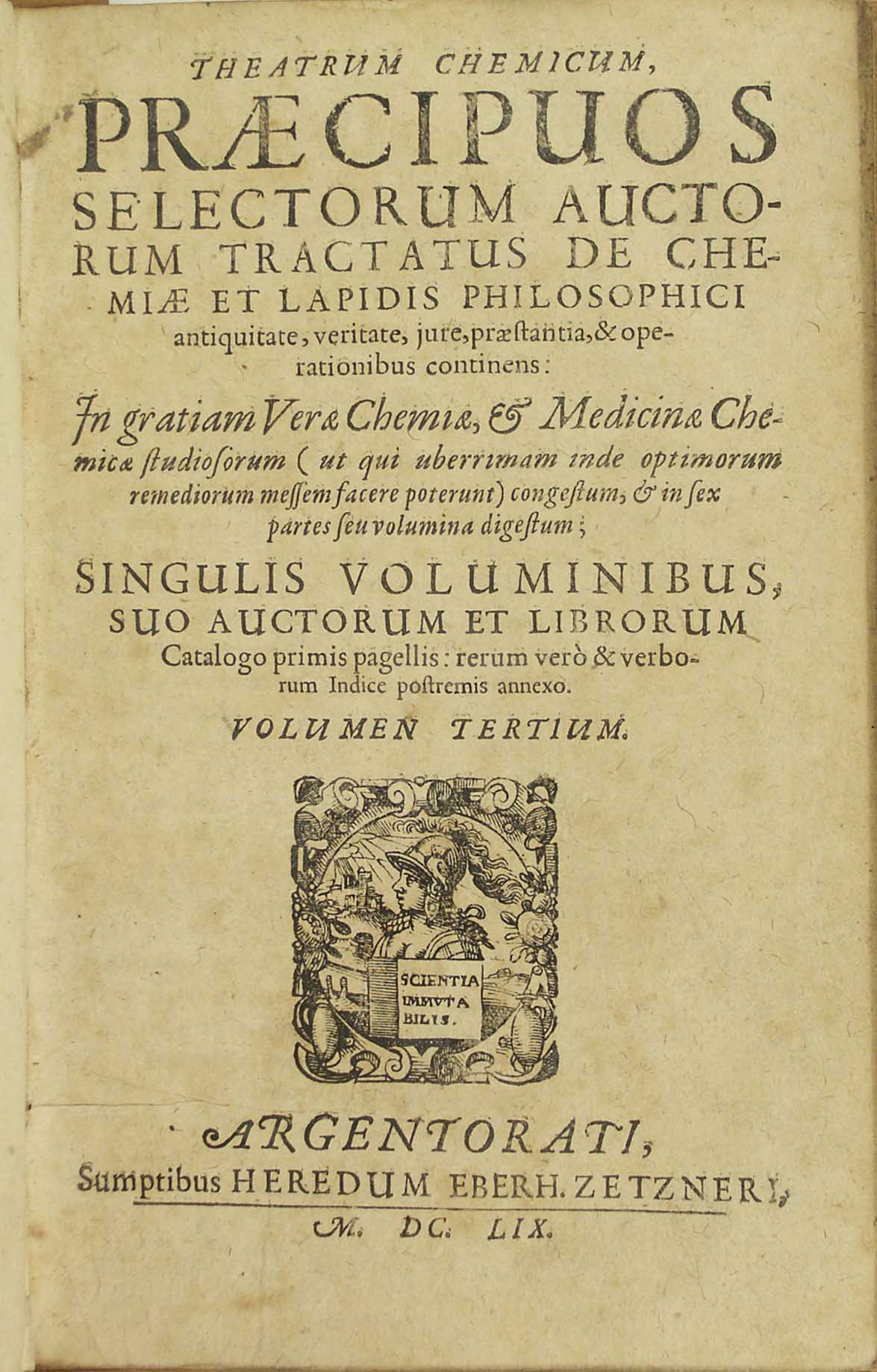
Page One of Theatrum Chemicum Volume III. Originally published 1602, Strasbourg by Lazarus Zetzner.

- Elenchus auctorum et tractatuum tertiae partis (Table of Contents)
- Liber de magni lapidis compositione et operatione, auctore adhuc incerto sed tamen doctissimo (De alchemia incerti auctoris)
- De magni lapidis sive benedicti compositione et operatione aliquot capita, ex manuscriptis (Note: possibly written by Jean de Meung or a retitling of "De lapide philosophico incerti auctoris", see Theatrum Chemicum Electronicum)
- Aristoteles, De perfecto magisterio
- Arnaldus de Villanova, Liber perfecti magisterii, qui lumen luminum nuncupatur... vocatur etiam Flos florum
  - Arnaldus de Villanova, Practica ex libro dicto Breviarius librorum alchemiae
  - Arnaldus de Villanova, De decoctione lapidis philosophorum, et de regimine ignis
- Efferarius Monachus, De lapide philosophorum secundum verum modum formando
- Efferarius Monachus, Thesaurus philosophiae
- Raymundus Lullus, Praxis universalis magni operis
- Odomar, Practica magistri Odomari ad discipulum
- Historia antiqua de argento in aurum verso (Note: possibly ascribed to Odomar, see Theatrum Chemicum Electronicum)
- Tractatus de marchasita, ex qua tandem cum aliis dicendis fit elixir ad album verissimum
- De arsenico
  - Praeparatio salis armoniaci secundum Rasim
  - De sale alkali
- Quaestio, an lapis philosophicus (valeat contra pestem)
- Vetus epistola doctissimi de metallorum materia, et artis imitatione
  - Caravantes Hispanus, Practica Caravantis Hispani
- Johannes de Rupescissa, Liber magisterii de confectione veri lapidis philosophorum
- Giovanni Aurelio Augurello, Chrysopoeia ad Leonem decimum pontificem maximum (carmine conscripta)
- Giovanni Aurelio Augurello, Geronticon
- Thomas Aquinas, Secreta alchemiae magnalia
  - Tractatus de lapide philosophico, et primo de corporibus supercaelestibus
  - Thomas Aquinas, Tractatus datus fratri Reinaldo, in arte alchimiae (Note: a retitling of Thesaurus alchemiae secretissimus ad fratrem Reinaldum", see Theatrum Chemicum Electronicum)
- Joannes de Rupescissa, Liber lucis
- Raymundus Lullus, Clavicula, quae et apertorium dicitur
- Joannes Isaac Hollandus, Operum mineralium, sive de lapide philosophico
- Ewaldus Vogelius, (Note: A.K.A. Theobaldus van Hoghelande, see Theatrum Chemicum Electronicum) Liber de lapidis physici conditionibus; quo abditissimorum auctorum Gebri et Raymundi Lullii methodica continetur explicatio
  - Praefatio
  - Libri de inventione veritatis seu perfectionis (Note: retitling of "De oleaginitate minerali", see Theatrum Chemicum Electronicum)
  - De materiae tenuitate et subtilitate spirituali
  - De affinitate medic. et metal
  - De radicali humiditate ignea
  - De puritatis claritate
  - De terra figente
  - De tinctura alba vel rubea
- Tractatus septem de lapide philosophico (Note: edited by Justus a Balbian (Justus Abalbian Flander, see Theatrum Chemicum Electronicum)
  - Praefatio
  - Rosarius abbreviatus
- Jodocus Greverus (Grewer), Secretum nobilissimum et verissimum
- Alanus, Dicta de lapide philosophico e Germanico Latinae redita
  - Praefatio
  - Dicta Alani philosophi de lapide philosophico
- Conclusio summaria ad intelligentiam Testamenti seu Codicilli Raymundi Lullii, et aliorum librorum ejus; nec non argenti vivi, in quo pendet intentio tota intentiva, qua aliter Repertorium Raymundi appellatur (Note: (Tractatus de lapide philosophorum), see Theatrum Chemicum Electronicum)
  - Joannes Pontanus, Epistola in qua de lapide, quem philosophorum vocant, agitur
  - Carmina alchemica
- Nicolas Barnaud, Commentariolum in quoddam epitaphium Bononiae studiorum, ante multa secula maemoreo lapidi insculptum
- Nicolas Barnaud, Processus chemici
  - Addam et processum sub forma missae, a Nicolao Melchiore Cibinensi Transilvano, ad Ladislaum Ungariae et Bohemiae regem olim missum
  - Carmen elegans
- Triga chemica (Note: edited by Nicolas Barnaud, see Theatrum Chemicum Electronicum)
  - Lambspringk, De lapide philosophico libellus e Germanico versu Latine reditus
  - Philosophus Gallus Delphinas Anonymus, Liber secreti maximi totius mundanae gloriae
  - Extractum ex Cimbalo aureo, antiquissimo libro manuscripto, ad rem nostram faciens
  - Arcanum philosophorum
    - Nicolas Barnaud, Brevis elucidatio illius arcani philosophorum
- Quadriga aurifera
  - Ad lectorem
  - Prima rota: Tractatus de philosophia metallorum
  - Secunda rota: George Ripley, Liber duodecim portarum
    - Epistola dedicatoria
    - Liber duodecim portarum
  - Tertia rota: George Ripley, Liber de mercurio et lapide philosophorum
  - Quarta et ultima rota: Scriptum probi, et non male docti viri, cujus nomen excidit, elixir solis Theophrasti Paracelsi tractans
    - Tabula Coelum philosophicum
  - Nicolas Barnaud, Processus
- Auriga chemicus
  - Praefatio
  - Auriga chemicus, sive Theosophiae palmarium
- De occulta philosophia epistola
  - Ad lectorem
  - De occulta philosophia epistola cuiusdam patris ad filium
- Paucula dicta sapientum
- Index rerum et verborum memorabilium, quae in hoc tertio volumine continentur (Index)

=== Volume IV ===
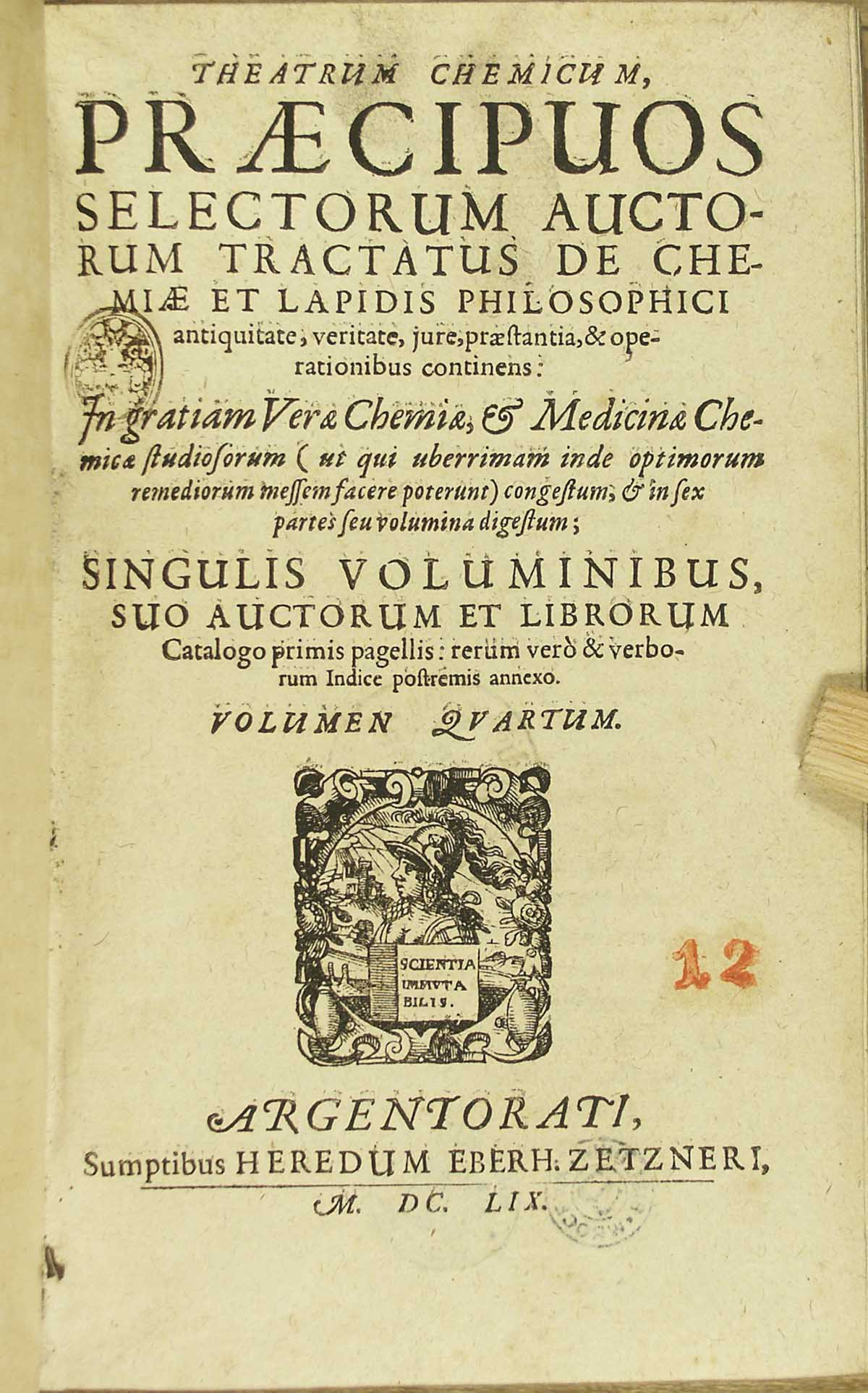
Page One of Theatrum Chemicum Volume IV. Published 1613, Strasbourg by Lazarus Zetzner.

The fourth volume of Theatrum Chemicum was published in 1613 in Strasbourg. At the time of publication a reprinting of Volumes I-III was also issued. The reprinted editions are almost identical, though there are differences in details, such as page number, formatting, and minor rewording not affecting content. This often leads to differences in citations that use Theatrum Chemicum as a reference source. The single significant difference in the new editions is the inclusion of a tract in Volume 3 entitled "De magni lapidis sive benedicti compositione et operatione (Liber magiae generalis)" which is missing from the earlier editions. With the additional tracts found in Volume IV, the total tracts grew to 143.

- Lazarus Zetzner, Praefatio ad lectorem (1613) (Introduction)
- Elenchus auctorum et tractatuum huius quarti voluminis (Table of Contents)
- Raymundus Lullus, Testamentum. Theorica
- Raymundus Lullus, Testamentum. Practica super lapide philosophico
- Raymundus Lullus, Compendium animae transmutationis artis metallorum Ruperto Anglorum Regi transmissum
  - De significatione literarum
  - Typographus lectori
- Artefius, Liber qui Clavis majoris sapientiae dicitur
  - Ad lectorem
  - De generatione animalis
- Heliophilus a Percis Philochemicus, (Note: possibly written by Raphael Eglin, see Theatrum Chemicum Electronicum) Nova disquisitio de Helia Artista
  - Philochemicus Heliophilus a Percis Philochemicus
  - Heliophilus a Percis Philochemicus, Nova disquisitio de Helia Artista theophrasteo, super metallorum transformatione, etc.
- Hieronymus de Zanetinis, Conclusio (comparatio alchimiae), qua disputationi et argumentis Angeli respondetur
- Thomas Arfoncinus, De jure alchymiae responsum
- Anonymus, De materia et praxi lapidis philosophorum; Von der Materi und Prattick dess Steins der Weisen
  - Vorred an den Kunstliebenden Leser
  - Programma ad lectorem philochymicum
  - Gulden Gedicht
  - Carmen apollineum
  - Plutarchus, De capienda utilitate ex inimicis
- Nicolaus Niger Happelius, Cheiragogia Heliana de auro philosophico, nec dum cognito
  - Programma authoris
  - Praefatio (dated 4 July 1612)
  - Protestatio
  - Carmen appolineum Helianum
- Venceslaus Lavinus Moravus, Tractatus de coelo terrestri
- Nicolaus Niger Hapelius, Disquisitio Heliana
  - Praefatio
  - Disquisitio Heliana de metallorum transformatione, etc.
- Fabianus de Monte S. Severini, Ex tract. de empt. et vend.
- Nicolaus Niger Happelius, Aphorismi Basiliani sive canones hermetici de spiritu, anima et corpore medio majoris et minoris mundi
- Andreas Brentzius, Variae philosophorum sententiae perveniendi ad lapidem benedictum
  - Epistola dedicatoria (ad Wolfgango episcopo ratisbonensi), (Dated 20 January 1606)
  - Sententiae seu processus Alberti Magni philosophi
  - Processus Raimundi Lulli, quem in suis libris hinc inde descripsit: praesertim Testamento novissimo, et in luce Mercuriorum
  - Processus Lulli secundum mentem Jani Lacinii Calabri, quem tamen ego non probo
  - Processus Gebri Arabis, collectus ex variis locis summae perfectionis, in quibus sparsim Geber eum tradidit
  - Tinctura Gebri ad rubeum
  - Alius et quidam praestantissimus rubeae tincturae modus, Gebro sparsim parce et paucis verbis positus
  - Tinctura ad album ex arsenico a Gebro descripta
  - Processus B. Thomae de Aquino, quem admodum ejus facit mentionem Paracelsus
  - Paracelsi tinctura ex solo sulphure
  - Processus Paracelsi nobilissimus, quem paucissimus verbis in Tinctura physicorum exposuit
  - Modus perveniendi ad tincturas per Mercurios corporum perfectorum
  - Usus secundus (primus) Mercuriorum e corporibus extractorum
  - Usus secundus Mercuriorum e corporibus extractorum
  - Usus tertius Mercuriorum ex corporibus perfectis extractorum
  - Usus quartus Mercuriorum e metallicis perfectis corporibus confectorum
  - Processus quorundam ex antiquis. Ex Mercurio vulgari, et Sole vel Luna
  - Processus coagulandi amalgamata per spiritum sive animam Saturni
- Series tractatuum huius philosophiae chymicae
  - Bernardus Gilles Penotus, Epistola (ad Mauritium Lantgravium Hassiae)
    - I. L., Ad authorem huius apologiae
    - I. B. A., Ad eundem
    - Guilielmus Dubroc, Ad eundem
    - Stephanus Gasconius, Ad eundem
  - Gaston Dulco, (Note: A.K.A. Gaston LeDoux de Claves, see Theatrum Chemicum Electronicum) De triplici praeparatione auri et argenti
    - Bernardus Gilles Penotus, Praefatio (ad lectorem)
    - Gaston Dulco, Epistola dedicatoria (ad Jacobo Laffinio, 1594)
    - De triplici praeparatione auri et argenti
  - Gaston Dulco, De recta et vera ratione progignendi lapidis philosophici, seu salis argentifici et aurifici. Dilucida et compendiosa explicatio
  - Anonymus, (Note: amicus typographi (written by male friend typographer), see Theatrum Chemicum Electronicum) Canones seu regulae decem, de lapide philosophico
    - Typographus lectori
  - Epilogus totius rei hic est
- Divi Leschi Genus Amo, Duodecim tractatus de lapide philosophorum
  - Praefatio ad lectorem
  - Johan Henricus Alstedius, Epigramma
  - Tractatus I: De impossibilitate naturae
  - Tractatus II: De operatione naturae
  - Tractatus III: De prima metallorum materia
  - Tractatus IV: Quomodo metalla in terrae visceribus generantur?
  - Tractatus V: De generatione lapidum
  - Tractatus VI: De secunda materia
  - Tractatus VII: De virtute secundae materiae
  - Tractatus VIII: De arte
  - Tractatus IX: De commixtione metallorum
  - Tractatus X: De generatione supernaturali
  - Tractatus XI: De praxi et confectione lapidis
  - Tractatus XII: De lapide, et ejus virtute
  - Epilogus seu conclusio horum duodecim tractatuum
- Divi Leschi Genus Amo, Aenigma philosophorum
- Divi Leschi Genus Amo, Parabola seu aenigma philosophorum, coronidis et superadditamenti loco adjunctum
- Divi Leschi Genus Amo, Dialogus Mercurii, alchymistae, et naturae (de lapide philosophorum)
  - (Ad lectorem)
- M. Georgio Beato interprete, Aureliae occultae philosophorum partes duae
  - Aenigma philosophorum sive symbolum Saturni, per parabolas Azoth dilucide ostendens
  - Pars prima
  - Pars secunda
- Arnoldus de Villanova, Speculum alchymiae
  - Hieronymus Megiserus, Admodum reverendo et obilissimo Dn. Wolfgango ad Heussenstam
  - Vita Arnaldi de Vila Nova
  - Arnoldus de Villanova, Speculum alchymiae
- Arnoldus de Villanova, Nova carmen
- Arnoldus de Villanova, Quaestiones tam essentiales quam accidentales ad Bonifacium octavum
- Philosopho Anonymo, Tractatus de secretissimo antiquorum philosophorum arcano
  - Praefatio ad lectorem
  - Catalogus autorum qui in hoc opusculo continentur
  - XXII propositiones sive maximae in quibus veritas totius artis chemicae brevissime comprehenditur
  - Joannes de Lasnioro, Tractatus secundus aureus de lapide philosophorum
  - Joannes Trithemius, Tractatus III chemicus nobilis
- Hermes Trismegistus, Tractatus aureus de lapidis physici secreto
  - Dominicus Gnosicus Belga, Epistola dedicatoria (ad Ladislao Welen, baroni a Zierotin)
  - Subiectissimus Anonymus, Praefatio (ad Jacobo Alsteinio, dated 23 October 1608)
  - Hermes Trismegistus, Tractatus aureus de lapidis physici secreto, in capitula septem divisus: nunc vero a quodam Anonymo (Note: possibly written by Israel Harvet, see Theatrum Chemicum Electronicum) scholiis illustratus
  - Capitulum primum
  - Capitulum secundum
  - Capitulum tertium
  - Capitulum quartum
  - Capitulum quintum
  - Capitulum sextum
  - Capitulum septimum
  - Conclusio totius tractatus
- David Lagneus, (Note: A.K.A. L'Agneau, see Theatrum Chemicum Electronicum) Harmonia seu consensus philosophorum chemicorum
  - Epistola dedicatoria (ad Heroaldo, Valgrinosae domino, 1611)
  - Praefatio (1611)
  - Urbanus, Johanni Herovardo
  - Buetus, Ad D. Lagneum
  - Catalogus auctorum in hac harmonia citatorum
  - Harmonia seu consensus philosophorum chemicorum, magno cum studio et labore in ordinem digestus, et a nemine alio hac methodo distributus
  - (Ad lectorem)
  - Aenigmaticum quoddam epitaphium (Note: A.K.A. Aelia Laelia Crispis, see Theatrum Chemicum Electronicum) Bononiae studiorum, ante multa secula, marmoreo lapidi insculptum (vide III, 744)
  - Arcanum philosophorum, per virum doctissimum olim versu hexametro conscriptum
  - M. Quadratus, In harmoniam chemicam D. Lagnei, ex intimis intimi
- Albertus Magnus, De concordantia philosophorum in lapide
- Albertus Magnus, Compositum de compositis
- Albertus Magnus, (Note: also attributed to Avicenna, see Theatrum Chemicum Electronicum) Liber octo capitulorum: De lapide philosophorum
- Avicenna, Ad Hasen regem epistola de re recta
- Avicenna, Declaratio lapidis physici filio suo Aboali
- Avicenna, De congelatione et conglutinatione lapidum
- Guilhelmus Tecenensis, Liber lilium tanquam de spinis evulsum
- Joannes Dumbeler, (Note: A.K.A. John Dombelay, see Theatrum Chemicum Electronicum) Practica vera alkimica per magistrum Ortholanum Parisiis probata et experta sub anno domini 1358
- Anonymus, Lumen juvenis experti novum (Note: attributed to A. de Villanova, Novum lumen, see Theatrum Chemicum Electronicum)
- Magister Valentinus, Opus praeclarum ad utrumque magistri Valentini expertissimi. Quod pro testamento dedit filio suo adoptivo, qui etiam istum tractatulum propria manu scripsit Joanni Apot (Apotecario)
- Anonymus, Super (hoc ipsum) tractatulum: "Studio namque florenti"
- Opus ad album
- Thomas Aquinas, Liber lilii benedicti 26. Mer: fugi dum bibit Lunam sedecies duplum
  - Opus excellentissimum S. Thomae de Aquino
  - Super tractatulum "Mer fugi dum bibit"
- Anonymus, Breve opus ad rubeum cum sole per aquas fortes
- Petrus de Silento, Opus
- De lapide philosophico
  - Joachimus Tanckius, (Note: A.K.A. Joachim Tancke, see Theatrum Chemicum Electronicum) Epistola dedicatoria (ad Bernhardo G. Penoto, Lipsiae) (Dated 1 April 1603)
  - Joachimus Tanckius, Ad lectorem
  - Anonymus, Tractatus philosophicus ad rubrum et album
  - Joachimus Tanckius, Epistola dedicatoria (ad Nicolao Bernaudo, Lipsiae 1603)
  - Paulus Eck de Sultzbach, Clavis philosophorum. Ludus puerorum et labor mulierum. Annno 1489
- Index rerum memorabilium, quae in hoc quarto volumine continentur, copiosissimus (Index)

=== Volume V ===
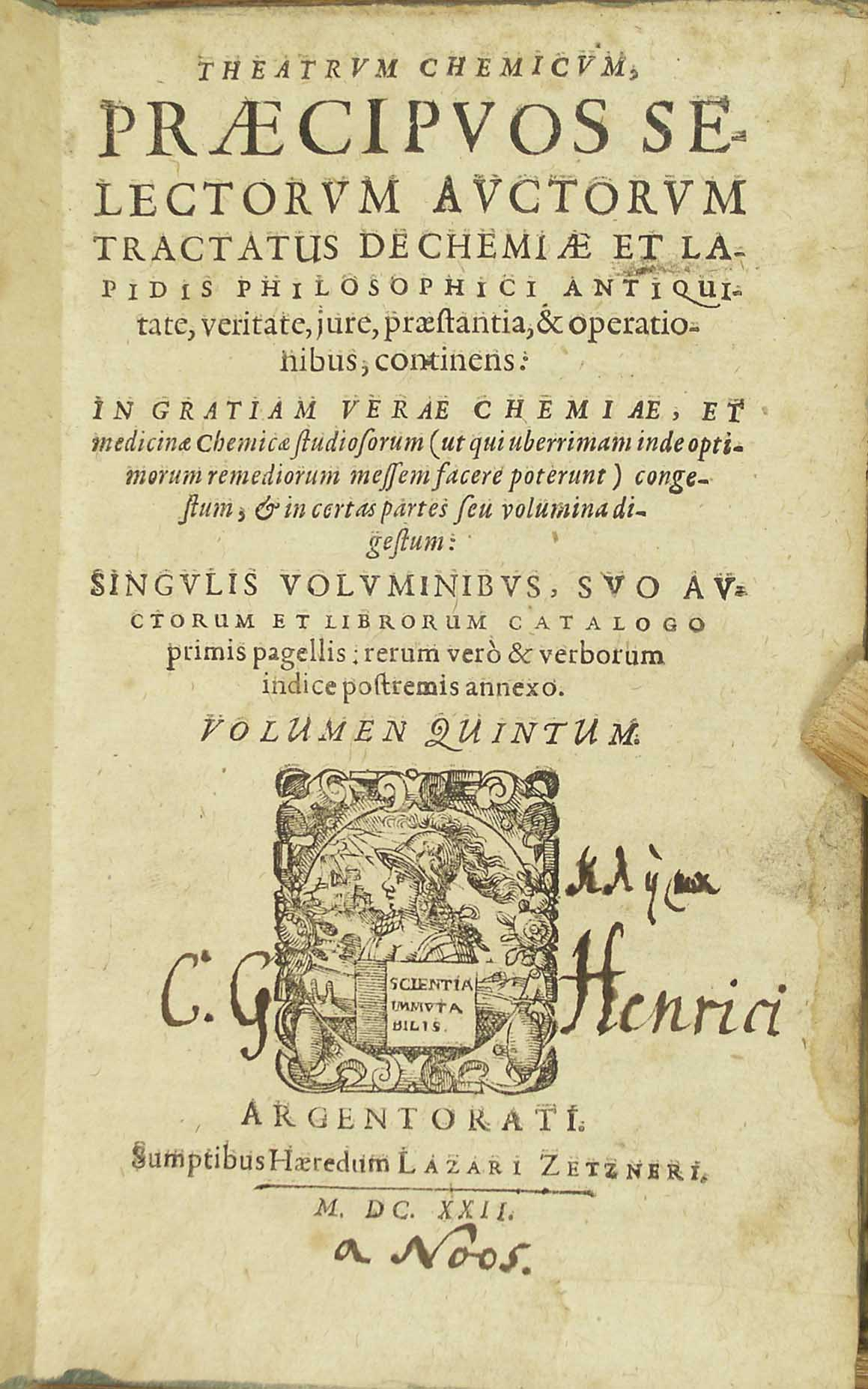
Page One of Theatrum Chemicum Volume V. Published 1622, Strasbourg by Lazarus Zetzner.

The fifth volume of Theatrum Chemicum was published in 1622 in Strasbourg. This is the first of the volumes to be published by Zetzner's heirs, most likely Eberhardi Zetzner, though the text still bears Lazarus Zetzner's name. This volume contains a substantial number of "older" tracts, including one of the oldest alchemical tracts in existence, Turba Philosophorum. These additions would increase the number of tracts to 163.

- Heredes L. Zetzneri, Lectori candido (Introduction)
- Elenchus auctorum et tractatuum quinti voluminis (Table of Contents)
- Turba philosophorum, ex antiquo manuscripto codice excerpta, qualis nulla hactenus visa est editio
- In turbam philosophorum sermo unus anonymi (Note: possibly written by Alanus de Rupe, see Theatrum Chemicum Electronicum)
- Allegoriae sapientum supra librum Turbae: XXIX distinctiones
- Micreris, Tractatus Micreris suo discipulo Mirnefindo
- Plato, Platonis quartorum, cum commento Hebuhabes Hamed, explicati ab Hestole
- Calid filus Iarichi, Liber secretorum alchimiae, ex Hebraica lingua in Arabicam, et ex Arabica in Latinam translatus, interprete incerto
  - Praefatio
  - Liber secretorum regis Calid
- Calid, (Note: Believed to have been written by Muhammad ibn Zakarīya Rāzi, see Theatrum Chemicum Electronicum) Liber trium verborum
- Philosophiae chimicae duo vetustissima scripta
  - Senior Zadith filius Hamuelis, Tabula chimica, marginalibus adaucta (Senior de chemia)
- Willem Mennens, Aurei velleris sive sacrae philosophiae vatum selectae ac unicae mysteriorumque Dei, naturae, et artis admirabilium, libri tres
  - Epistola dedicatoria
  - Ad lectorem
  - Aurei velleris...
  - Argumenta capitum...
  - Consilium conjugii, seu De massa solis et lunae libri III (Anonymi libri III. de chemia)
- Petrus Bonus, Margarita novella correctissima
  - Praefatio
  - Ad alchemiam introductio
  - Margarita preciosa
- Michael Scotus, Quaestio curiosa de natura solis et lunae
- Lucas Rodargirus, Pisces Zodiaci inferioris vel De solutione philosophica. Cum aenigmatica totius lapidis epitome
  - Epistola
  - Pisces Zodiaci inferioris vel De solutione philosophica
  - Lucaa Rodargirius, Chymia compendiaria ad Johannem Riturum
- Alphonsus Rex Castellae, Liber philosophiae occultioris, (praecipue metallorum) profundissimus, cui titulum fecit: Clavis sapientiae
  - Proemiolum
  - Clavis sapientiae
- Aristoteles Alchymista, Tractatus ad Alexandrum Magnum, De lapide philosophico, breviloquium
- Monachus benedictinus anonymus, Epistola ad Hermannum Archiepiscopum Coloniensem, de lapide philosophico. Opuscula Platonis et Arnoldi Villanovani recensens
- Thomas Aquinas, Tractatus sextus, de esse et essentia mineralium tractans
- Cornelius Alvetanus Arnsrodius, De conficiendo divino elixire, sive lapide philosophico
- Animadversiones chemicae quatuor quibus ars περι χημειασ universa, tam practice quam theorice enudatur
- Roger Bacon, Epistolae (ad Gulielmum Parisiensem conscripta) de secretis operibus artis et naturae, et de nullitate magiae (Note: Edited by John Dee, see Theatrum Chemicum Electronicum)
  - Dedicatio ad Roseae Crucis fratribus
  - Epistola ad lectorem
  - Epistolae Rogerii Baconis de secretis operibus artis et naturae
  - John Dee, Ad Baconis epistolam adnotata
- Christophorus Horn, De auro medico philosophorum, id est de illo occulto, salutari, solari omnium mineralium, vegetalium, et animalium corporum, spiritu. Dialogus scholasticus
- Index rerum memorabilium quae hoc in opere continentur (Index)

=== Volume VI ===
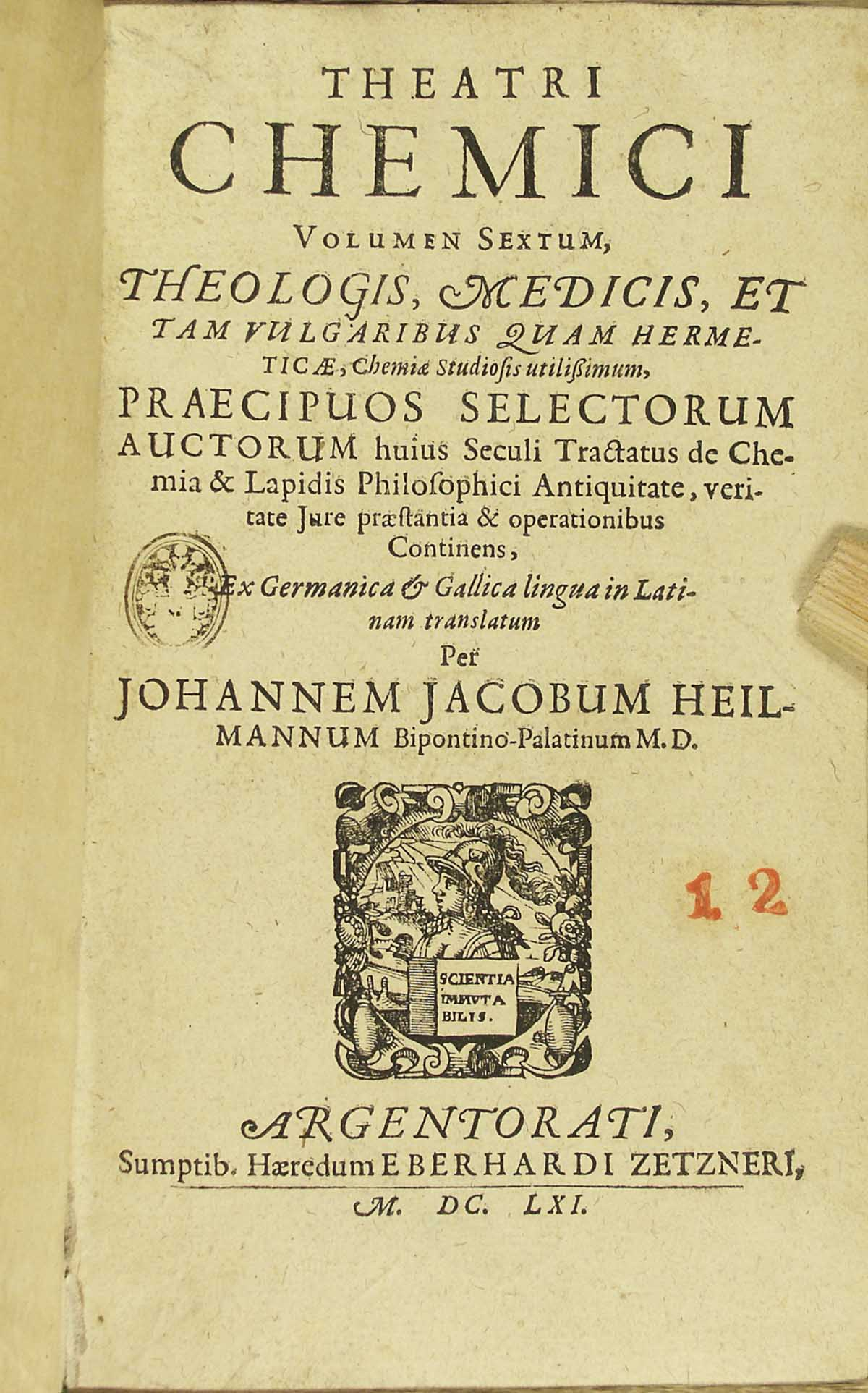
Page One of Theatrum Chemicum Volume VI. Published 1659-61, Strasbourg by Lazarus Zetzner.

The final volume of Theatrum Chemicum was published in 1659–1661 in Strasbourg. Volume VI was published by Eberhardi Zetzner, though compiled by Johannes Jacobus Heilman. This volume contains tracts originally issued in German or French, but were translated by Heilman into Latin. These additional tracts would increase the total tracts to over 200.

- Johannes Jacobus Heilman, Dedicatio (ad Friderico, comiti palatino ad Rhenum) (Dedication)
- Johannes Jacobus Heilman, Praefatio Dedicatio (secunda ad J.F.H.S. Sendivogii filio) (Note: ed. J. Hartprecht (Zweibrücken 1661))
- Johannes Jacobus Heilman, Praefatio ad lectorem (Introduction)
- Elenchus authorum et XII. tractatuum voluminis sexti (Table of Contents)
- Blasius Vigenerius, Tractatus de igne et sale
- Tractatus de sale et igne. Pars secunda
- Johannes Collesson, (Note: A.K.A., Johannes (Jean) Collesson) Idea perfecta philosophiae hermeticae
- Dedicatio (ad Gastoni Burbonio, Ludovici XIII regis fratri unico)
- Constans et unanimis vere philosophantium de physici lapidis materia atque operationibus sententia
- Idea perfecta philosophiae hermeticae, seu abbreviatio theoriae et praxeos lapidis philosophici observationibus, ad melius intelligendum principia et fundamenta naturae et philosophiae, aucta
- Observationes necessariae ad bene intelligendum principia et fundamenta naturae et philosophiae hermeticae (De principiis philosophiae hermeticae)
- Anonymus Philosophus, Fidelissima et jucunda instructio patris ad filium ex manuscripto Gallico desumpta
- Praefatio
- Hermes in superiori sphaera est in medio fontisvena, quae est philosophorum regula prima. Summa decem capitum sequentium
- Instructio de arbore solari
- Christophorus Parisiensis, Elucidarius artis transmutatoriae metallorum summa major
  - Praefatio authoris
  - Elenchus rerum quae in hoc opusculo continentur
  - Elucidarii liber primus (de arte transmutatoria) in VII. capita divisus
  - Appendix theorica pro meliore praecedentium declaratione
  - Elucidarii liber secundus seu practica scientiae arboris philosophalis
  - Elucidarii liber III. seu tertia pars elucidarii. De ordine medicinarum cum reprobatione sophisticationum Geberi
  - Recapitulatio exacta trium elucidarii partium seu librorum
  - Clavis (elucidarii) seu explicatio alphabeti, quo operationes artificis diversae abbreviationis causa denotantur
  - Appendix practica (ad elucidarium) ante hac nunquam visa
  - Tractatulus accuratissimus de compositione sulphuris et menstrui vegatibilis seu auro potabili secundum
- Johannes Grasseus alias Chortalasseus, Arca arcani artificiosissimi de summis naturae mysteriis. Constructa ex rustico majore et minore, et physica naturalis rotunda visionem cabalisticum chemicam descripta, quibus accessit appendix anonymi cuiusdam philosophi de via ad aurum potabile perveniendi
  - De lapide philosophorum in genere
  - De consensu philosophorum
  - Pars secunda: Lilium inter spinas (1598)
  - De praxis authoris
  - Anonymus, (Note: Believed to have been authored by Franz Krell, see Theatrum Chemicum Electronicum citation) Physica naturalis rotunda visionis chemicae cabalisticae (Cabala chemica)
- Admonitio. Instructio et probatio contra omnes eos, qui aurum potabile extra processum et tincturam lapidis philosophici universalis brevi temporis spatio praeparare sibi et aliis falso persuadent et sibi proponunt
  - Praefatio ad lectorem
  - Appendix de via ad aurum potabile philosophico
- Responsiones duae F. R. C. ad quosdam suos clientes
  - Prima responsio: Epistola F. R. C. de lapide philosophorum acquisitione
  - Altera responsio
- Andreas Orthelius, Commentator in Novum lumen chymicum Michaelis Sendivogii Poloni, XII. figuris in Germania repertis illustratum (1624)
  - Praefatio Orthelii
  - Commentator in Novum lumen chymicum Sendivogii
  - Epilogus et recapitulatio in Novum lumen chymicum Sendivogii
  - Andreas de Blauwen, (Note: A.K.A. Andreas Orthelius, see Theatrum Chemicum Electronicum) Epistola Andreae de Blavven scripta ad Petrum Andream Matthiolum in qua agitur de multiplici auri potabilis parandi ratione
  - Discursus Orthelii de praecedente Epistola Andreae de Blawen
  - Epistola anonymi de principiis artis Hermeticae
  - Expositio et practica lapidis adrop, collecta ex Plinii philosophi libro qui intitulatur: Aromaticum philosophorum thesaurus et secretum secretorum
  - Excerpta ex interlocutione Mariae Prophetissae sororis Moysis et Aaronis, habita cum aliquo philosopho dicto Aros de excellentissimo opere trium horarum
  - Orthelius, Explicatio verborum Mariae Prophetissae
  - Joannes Pontanus, Epistola in qua de lapide quem philosophorum vocant agitur
  - Orthelius, Commentatio in epistolam Joh. Pontani de lapide philosophorum
  - Haimon, Epistola Haimonis de quatuor lapidibus philosophicis materiam suam ex minori mundo desumentibus
- Cornelius Alvetanus, Epistola de conficiendo divino elixire, sive lapide philosophico (14 July 1565)
- Astronomia inferior seu planetarum terrestrium motus et variatio
- Summa rhytmorum Germanicorum de opere universali ex coelo soloque prodeunte
- Summa libri qui vocatur Gloria mundi, seu tabula Paradisi
- Michael Pezelius, Opus singulare procedens ex sale quodam centrali aethereo, resoluto in igne minerali terreno, seu oleo vitrioli, quod cum tinctura solis extracta fermentatur, & externo igne Solympico aut igne radiorum solis invisibili coquitur & maturatur. Ex Theophrasto redivivo Michaelis Pezelii circa finem
- Sententia aut compositio litis spiritus et judicis Mercurii. Ex vetusto scripto Bellum seu Duellum equestre vocato, ad accusationem et responsionem Solis et Martis, per picturas repraesenta (Note: Translation of the 'Urtheil oder Vergleichung . . ." in Sendivogius, Lumen Chymicum Novum; Epilogus Orthelii, 1624, see Theatrum Chemicum Electronicum)
- Summa rhytmorum parvorum Germanicorum, qui sunt ejusdem tenoris et sensus cum praecedentibus picturis, ad verbum expressa
- Annagramista "Harr gewiss Trost von Gott", Mysterium occultae naturae. Anonymi discipuli Johannis Grassei Chortalassei dicti nostro seculo insignis philosophi
  - Praefatio ad pium lectorem filii Sendivogii I.F.H.S. Lucernae salis et Sudi philosophici authoris, et mysterii hermetici possessoris
  - Invisibilia Dei a creatura mundi per ea quae facta sunt intellectu conspiciuntur
- Anonymus Discipulus Guidonis Magni de Monte Philosophi Graeci, Tractatulus, seu descriptio philosophici Adrop. Quaenam sit ejus species, et quomodo debeat elaborari et praeparari
  - Praefatio et instructio ad lectorem
  - De philosophico adrop
  - Calcinatio metallorum
  - De ovo philosophorum
  - Johannes Isaac Hollandus, Tractatus de urina quomodo per spiritum ejus omnes tinctura sint extrahenda
- Johannes Chartier, (Note: A.K.A. Jean Chartier, see Theatrum Chemicum Electronicum citation) Scientia plumbi sacri sapientum seu cognitio rararum potestatum et virtutum antimonii
  - Beys, Praefatio seu encomium in honorem authoris et plumbi sacri philosophorum
  - Consignatio articulorum seu argumentorum in hoc tractatu contentorum
  - Scientia plumbi sacri sapientum
- Joachim Polemann, Novum lumen medicum. De mysterio sulphuris philosophorum
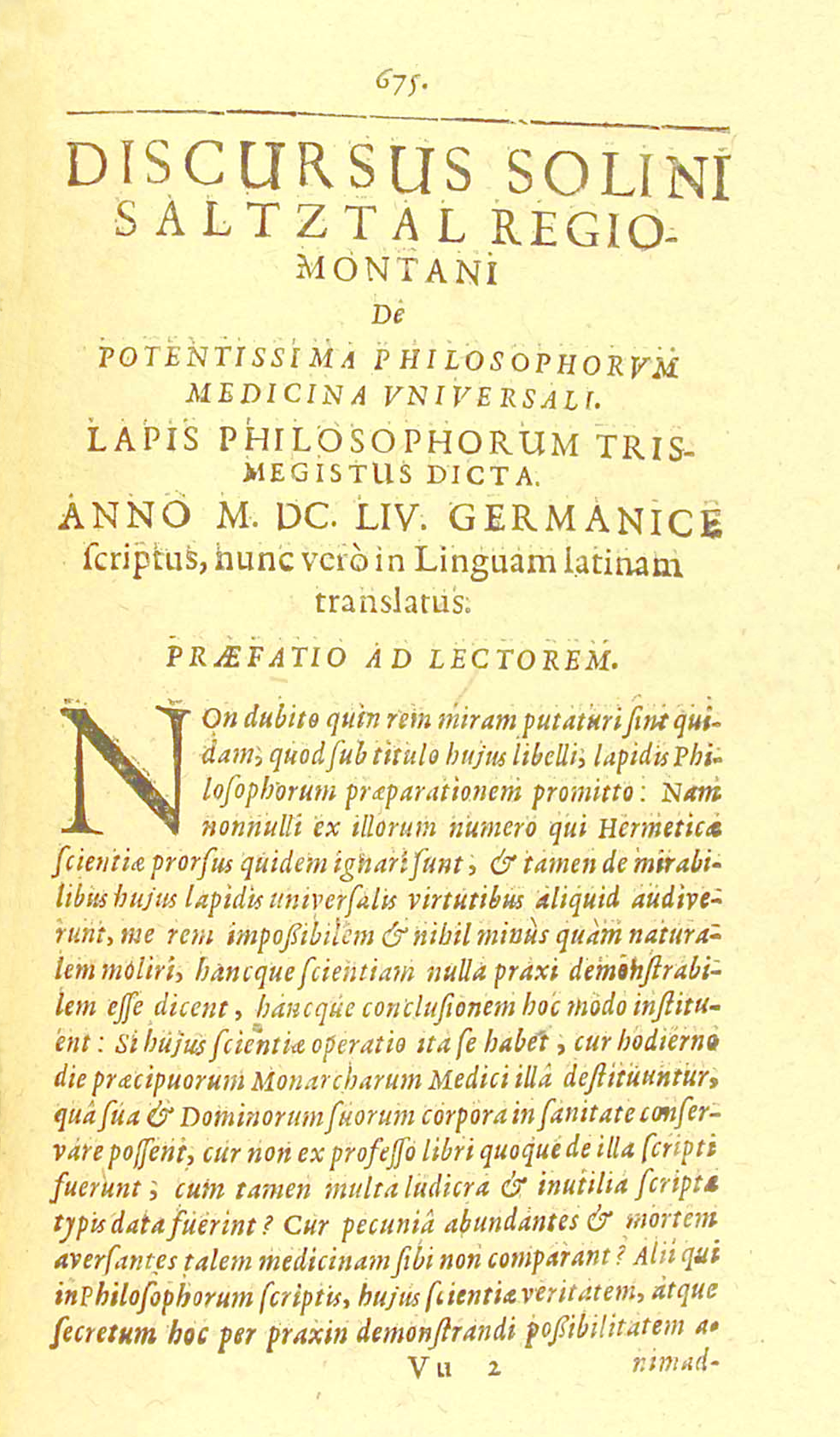
- Page 675 of Theatrum Chemicum Volume VI, showing the first page of 'Discursus Solini Saltztal Regiomontani De potentissima philosophorum medicina universali, lapis philosophorum trismegistus dicta.'
  Solinus Saltzthal Regiomontanus, De potentissima philosophorum medicina universali, lapis philosophorum trismegistus dicta (1654)
  - Praefatio ad lectorem
  - Brevis descriptio admirandae virtutis et operationis summae medicinae lapis philosophorum dictae
  - Discursus de philosophico fonte salino
  - Praefatio ad lectorem
- Hermes Trismegistos, Tabula smaragdina seu verba secretorum Hermetis
- Henri de Rochas, Tractatus de observationibus novis et vera cognitione aquarum mineralium et de illarum qualitatibus et virtutibus antehac incognitis. Item de spiritu universali (1634)
  - Caput I. De aquis sulphureis
  - Caput II. De aquis vitriolatis
  - Caput III. De aquis aluminosis
  - Caput IV. De aquis nitrosis
  - Caput V. De aquis ferruginosis
  - Caput VI. De spiritu universali
- Index locupletissimus in VI. volumen Theatri chymici (Index)

== Related publications ==
Though Theatrum Chemicum remains the most comprehensive single body of work on alchemy, future publications would emulate Zetzner's attempt to gather alchemical works into a single reference source. In 1652, Elias Ashmole published a similarly entitled work by the name of Theatrum Chemicum Britannicum in London. The two works are related by subject, but are different in content. However, because of the printing date of Ashmole's work and the similar titles, the two compendiums are often confused.

Then in 1702, Jean-Jacques Manget produced in Geneva the second most comprehensive collection of alchemical tracts in his Bibliotheca Chemica Curiosa which represents a total of almost 140 tracts, of which 35 had already been included in Theatrum Chemicum.

Another work, prepared by Friederich Roth-Scholtz, was entitled Deutsches Theatrum Chemicum. It was published in Nuremberg 1728-1732, and like Ashmole's work, it is related to Theatrum Chemicum in subject, but of different content.

== Resources ==
- H. C. Bolton, A select bibliography of chemistry, Washington 1893 (= Smithsonian Miscellaneous Collections, vol. XXXVI), p. 1051–1058
- J. Ferguson, Bibliotheca chemica, Glasgow 1906, vol. 2, p. 436-439
- A. L. Caillet, Manuel bibliographique des sciences psychiques ou occultes, Paris 1912, vol. 3, p. 591-595 (after N. Lenglet Dufresnoy, Histoire de la philosophie hermétique, Paris 1742, vol. 3, p. 49)
- T. Hofmeier, (collation of the three editions of Theatrum chemicum, the planned compilation by I. Habrecht and J. J. Manget's Bibliotheca chemica curiosa), appendix to: C. Gilly, "On the genesis of L. Zetzner's Theatrum Chemicum in Strasbourg" in: Magia, alchimia, scienza dal '400 al '700. L'influsso di Ermete Trismegisto, ed. C. Gilly, C. van Heertum, Firenze: Centro Di, 2003, p. 435-441, with a bibliography of original editions on p. 442-446
