= Grasshoff =

Grasshoff is a German surname, "Gras" meaning "grass", "Hof" meaning "court" or "farm". Spelling variants are Graßhoff, Grashoff, Graßhof or Grashof.

- Alex Grasshoff (1928–2008), American documentary filmmaker
- Franz Grashof (1826–1893), German engineer
- Fritz Grasshoff, born Graßhoff (1913–1997), German artist, painter, writer
- Johann Grasshoff (c.1560–1623), Pomeranian jurist and alchemical writer
- Karin Graßhof (1937–2025), German jurist
- Kurt Grasshoff (1891–1918), German pilot
- Rik Grashoff (born 1961), Dutch engineer and politician
- Thorsten Grasshoff or Paul T. Grasshoff (born 1969), German actor (in German)

== See also ==
- Grashof condition, used when analysing kinematic chains, named after Franz Grashof
- Grashof number ($\mathrm{Gr}$), dimensionless number in fluid dynamics and heat transfer, named after Franz Grashof
