= Monas Hieroglyphica =

1564 book by John Dee about an esoteric symbol

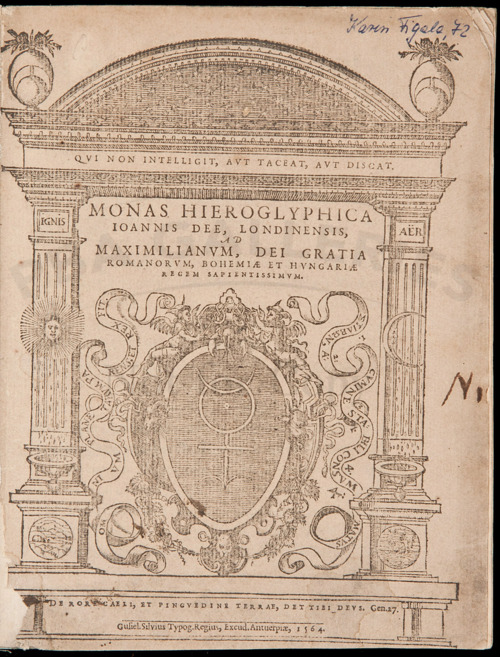
- Frontispiece of Monas Hieroglyphica
- Author: John Dee
- Language: Latin
- Subject: Astrology, alchemy, mysticism, metaphysics
- Published: 1564
- Publisher: Willem Silvius
- Publication place: Antwerp
- Pages: 107
- Text: Monas Hieroglyphica online

Dee's glyph, whose meaning he explained in Monas Hieroglyphica

Monas Hieroglyphica (or The Hieroglyphic Monad) is a book by John Dee, the Elizabethan magus and court astrologer of Elizabeth I of England, published in Antwerp in 1564. It is an exposition of the meaning of an esoteric symbol that he invented.

Dee's Monas Hieroglyphica presents a complex emblem constructed from various astrological symbols, with elements of Latin wordplay, capitalization, spacing, and diacritics, rendering its interpretation challenging. The symbol is intended to embody a profound concept, representing the unity of all creation influenced by celestial forces. Dee believed that this symbol contained the essence of alchemical transformation and spiritual evolution, and by meditating upon it, he aimed to access hidden knowledge transcending linguistic barriers. In merging astrology, alchemy, mysticism, and metaphysics, the Hieroglyphic Monad serves as a visual manifestation of Dee's interconnected worldview.

== Content ==
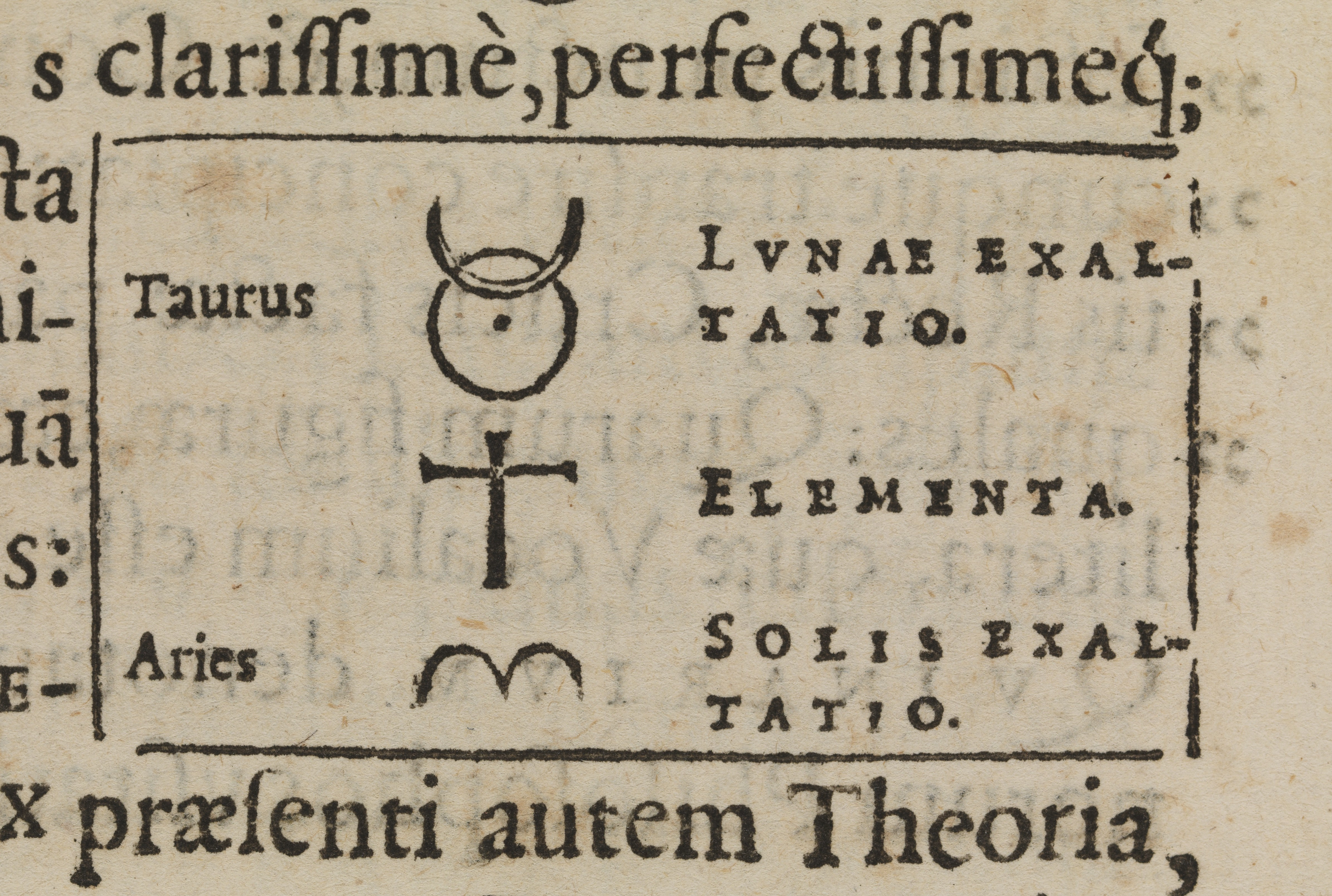
Different parts of the symbol could be combined to form other symbols.

Understanding the text is difficult because of Dee's Latin wordplay, unexplained capitalization, odd spacing and diacritics.

== Meaning of the symbol ==
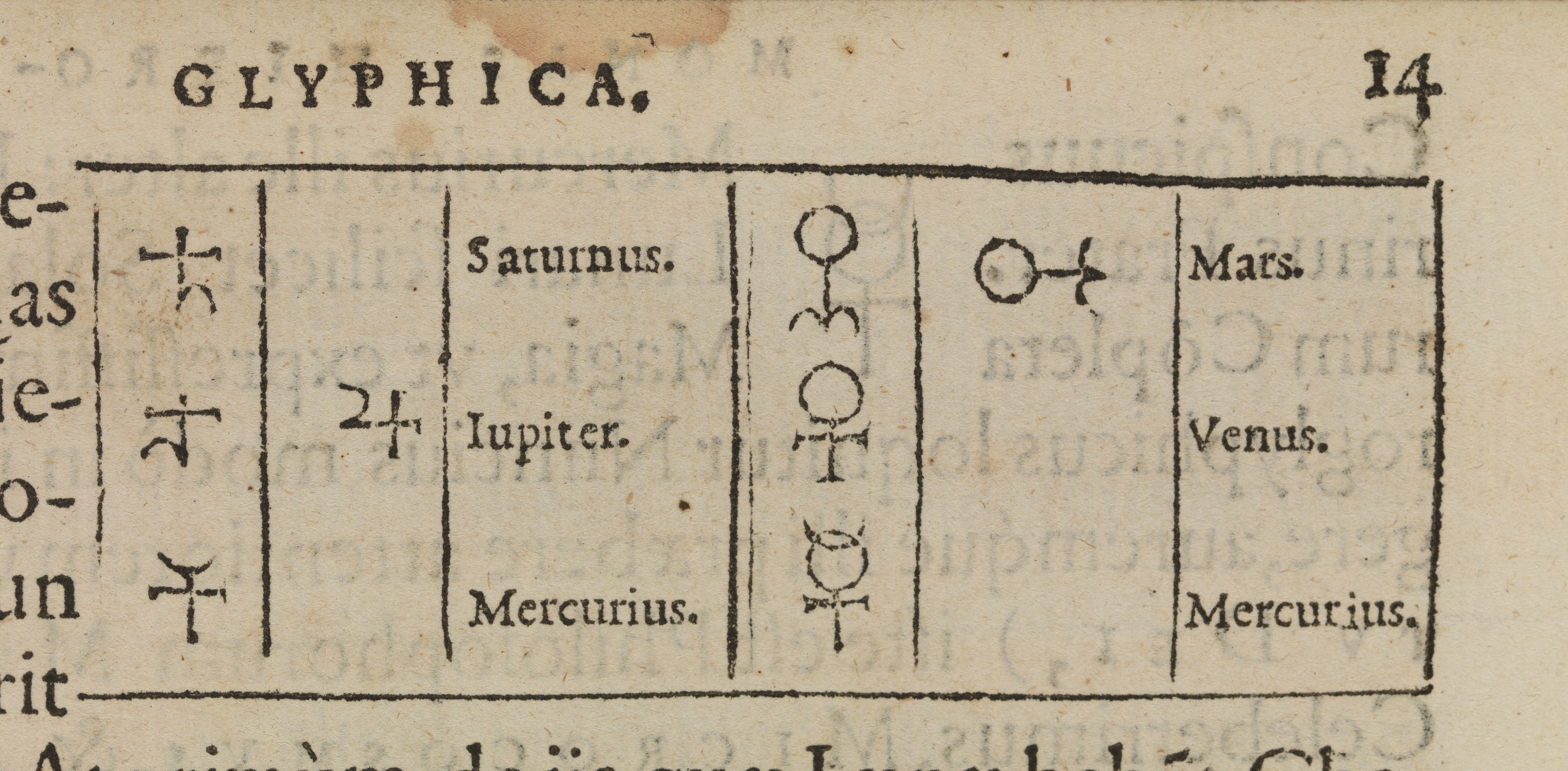
The symbol is said to be composed of other astrological symbols.

John Dee intended the Monad to incorporate a wide range of mystical and esoteric concepts. This complex symbol was meant to symbolize the unity of all creation, influenced by astrological and planetary forces. Dee believed it held the essence of alchemical transformation and spiritual growth. By meditating on the Monad, he sought to gain insights into hidden knowledge about the universe, transcending language barriers and tapping into profound truths. Overall, Dee's intention was to encapsulate his interconnected worldview, combining elements of astrology, alchemy, mysticism, and metaphysics.

== Reception and influence ==
The book received little notice in English sources, though it is praised in the 1591 edition of George Ripley's The Compound of Alchymy as well as in Elias Ashmole’s Theatrum Chemicum Britannicum (1652). A number of references appear in other languages, for example, Jean-Jacques Manget's Bibliotheca Chemica Curiosa (1702) and Lazarus Zetzner's Theatrum Chemicum (1602; 1659–1661); the latter reproduces the Monas Hieroglyphica in its entirety.

Gerard Dorn's Judgement of the Spagiric Art of Johann Trithemius (Note: G. Dorn, "De Spagirico Artificio Io. Trithemii sententia", in Zetzner (1659–1661), vol. 1, pp. 388–99, on 393.) contains terms and phrases based on the Monas, and his commentary on the Tractatus Aureus references the words ("Vulgaris, Hic, Oculus caligabit, diffidetque plurimum") accompanying a figure in the Monas, saying "with the eyes of the mind, for the vulgar eye, as John Dee of London says, will here find fault and be most distrustful." (Note: Manget, Bibliotheca Chemica Curiosa, I, 409: "In his autem numeris tacitè occultari sapientum pondera, author non obscure abstruere, videtur, praecipue in septenario, qui numerus sacer habitus fuit antiquitus, utpote in quo plurimum sapientiae sit reconditum: sed vim & virtutem ejus mentis oculis contemplari debes, Vulgaris enim hic oculus, teste Joanne Dee Londinensi, castigabit diffidetque plurimum.") Peter Forshaw suggests that it is likely that Dorn's use of the same line and circle figure in his Monarchia Physica or Monarchia Triadis, in Unitate (1577) (Note: G. Dorn, "Monarchia Triadis, in Unitate, Soli Deo Sacra," in Dorneus (1577), 65-127, on 71.) is a reference to the figure in Dee. It is also reproduced in the English logician, mathematician, and medic Thomas Oliver's De Sophismatum praestigijs cauendis admonitio (1604). His further comments in the work suggest that he was also familiar with Dee's "Mathematicall Praeface" to Billingsley's translation of Euclid's Elements of Geometrie (1570).

Giulio Cesare Capaccio refers to the Monas in his Delle imprese ("On devices", 1592), paraphrasing content from the preface and mentioning the "recondite Kabbalistic philosophy" of "Giovanni Dee da Londino". Cesare della Riviera includes Dee's glyph, without attribution, in his Il Mondo Magico de gli Heroi (1605). The glyph is also reproduced in the Amphitheatrum sapientiae aeternae (1595; 1609) of Heinrich Khunrath, where it is used in a more alchemical context.

The glyph was adopted by the Rosicrucians and appears on a page of the Rosicrucian manifesto Chymical Wedding of Christian Rosenkreutz (1616), beside the text of the invitation to the Royal Wedding given to Christian Rosenkreuz, who narrates the work. Frances Yates notes that Dee's influence later "spread to Puritanism in the New World through John Winthrop the Younger, an alchemist and a follower of Dee; Winthrop used the 'monas' as his personal mark".

== Publications ==
- Dee, John (1564). Monas Hieroglyphica (in Latin). Antwerp: Willem Silvius.
- Dee, John (1602). "Monas Hieroglyphica". In Zentner, L. (ed.). Theatrum Chemicum (in Latin). Vol. II (first ed.). pp. 203–43.
- Dee, John (1659). "Monas Hieroglyphica". In Zentner, L. (ed.). Theatrum Chemicum (in Latin). Vol. II (2nd ed.). pp. 178–215.
- Dee, John (2003). Monas Hieroglyphica (in Latin) (facsimile ed.). Kessinger Publishing Co. ISBN 0-7661-4744-4.

=== English translations ===
- Dee, John (1947). The Hieroglyphic Monad. Translated by J. W. Hamilton-Jones. John M. Watkins.
- Josten, C. H. (1964). "A Translation of John Dee's "Monas Hieroglyphica" (Antwerp, 1564), with an Introduction and Annotations". Ambix. XII (2–3): 84–221. doi:10.1179/000269864790223101.
- Dee, John (1975). The Hieroglyphic Monad. Translated by J. W. Hamilton-Jones. Weiser Books. ISBN 1-57863-203-X.
- Dee, John (2021). Monas Hieroglyphica. Translated by Teresa Burns and Nancy Turner. Ouroboros Press.

== See also ==
- Agrippa code
- Alchemical symbol
- Astrological symbols
- List of occult symbols
- Magical formula
- Monism
- Renaissance magic
