= Bernard Gilles Penot =

French alchemist

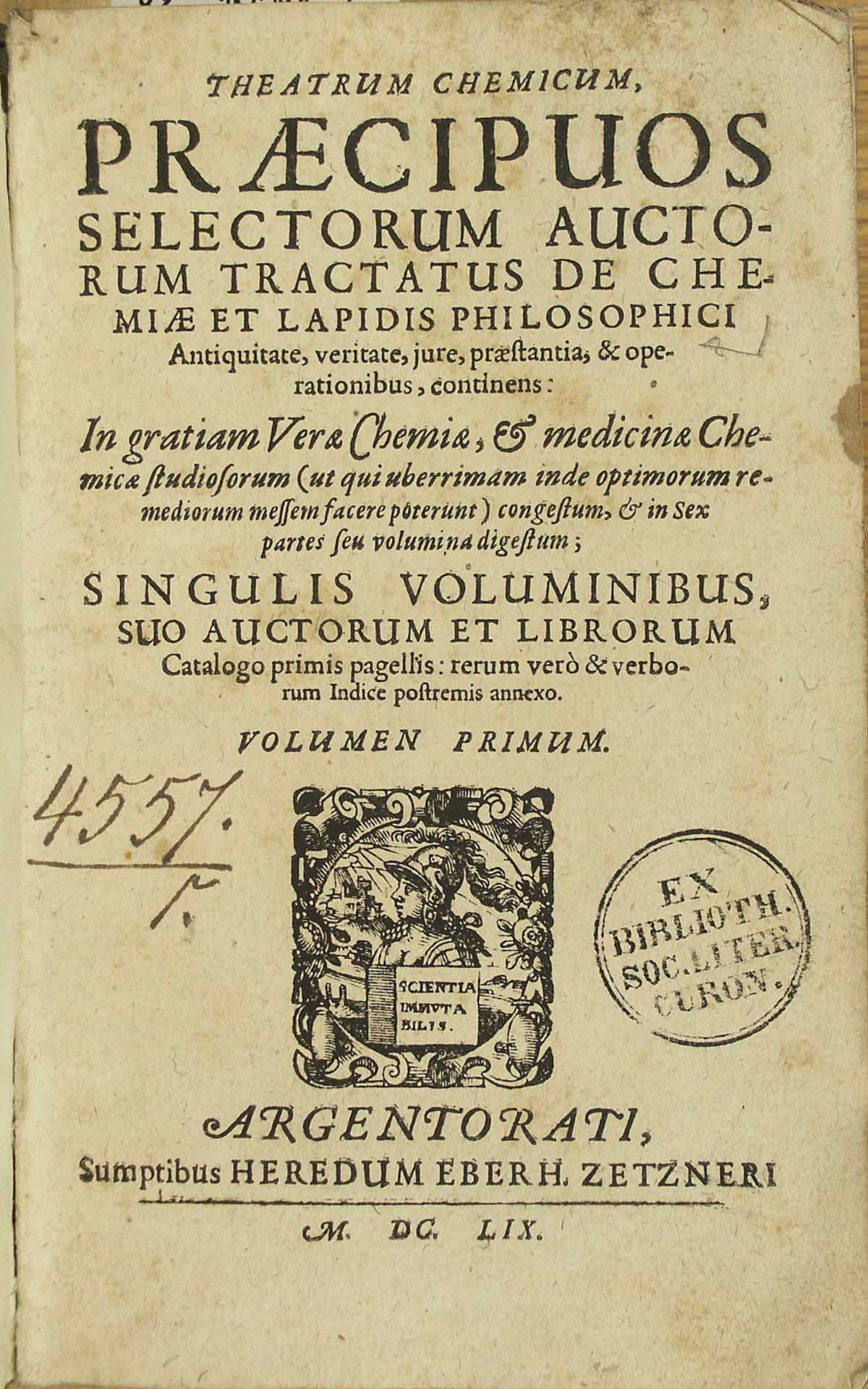

Bernard Gilles Penot (1519 in Guyenne – 1617 in Yverdon-les-Bains) was a French Renaissance alchemist and a friend of Nicolas Barnaud.

Penot studied in Basel. Penot came under the influence of Paracelsus through Adam von Bodenstein. He supposedly squandered his entire fortune on his alchemical studies, while searching for the Philosopher's Stone. In the end, he distanced himself from alchemy, which he had previously defended in writing.

Penot occasionally served as doctor in Frankenthal (Pfalz). He travelled a great deal and had a wide network of contacts and correspondents in England, Bohemia and Switzerland, and including Jacob Zwinger and Andreas Libavius. He died impoverished at the hospital in Yverdon-les-Bains (Ifferten), where he had been the city doctor from 1596.

The influential three-volume Theatrum Chemicum from 1602, a compendium of early alchemical writings, included the text of entitled: Treatise varii, the vera praeparatione et usu Medicamentorum chemicorum (Praefatio, De medicamentis chemicis). According to Didier Kahn he was also the publisher of the Centum quindecim curationes in 1582 which was attributed to Paracelsus.

== Works ==
- Abditorum chymicorum tractatus varii. Frankfurt, 1595.
- Apologia chemiae transmutatoriae. Bern, 1608.
- Libellus de lapide philosophorum. Frankfurt, 1594.
- Extractio mercurii ex auro
- Canones philosophici
- Quaestiones et responsones philosophicae
- Dialogus de arte chemica
- Aegidii de Vondis dialogus inter naturam et filium philosophiae
- Vademecum Theophrasticum. Magdeburg, 1607.
