= Michael Toxites =

German doctor, alchemist and poet (1514–1581)

- Born: Johann Michael Schütz; July 19, 1514; Sterzing, South Tyrol
- Died: 1581 (aged 66–67); Haguenau, Alsace
- Occupations: Doctor, poet, and alchemist

Michael Toxites, born Johann Michael Schütz (19 July 1514, Sterzing, South Tyrol – 1581, Haguenau, Alsace) was a doctor, alchemist and poet of the Holy Roman Empire.

== Biography ==
Toxites began his studies in Dillingen and later completed his Bachelor of Arts in Tübingen. In 1535, he continued his studies at the University of Pavia and earned a Master of Arts in 1542 at Wittenberg, where he studied under Philip Melanchthon. From 1537 he was a Latin teacher in Bad Urach in Baden-Württemberg. He poetic talent was such that he was named poet laureate by Charles V, Holy Roman Emperor in 1544.

When Wilhelm Xylander published the first Latin version of Marcus Aurelius's Meditations, Toxites is credited with having provided the codex containing the original for the work.

Toxites next found himself as head of school in Brugg in the Swiss canton, working there from 1549 to 1551. Between 1551 and 1556, he studied medicine at Strasbourg. He next served various as a professor of rhetoric and poetics at the University of Tübingen until 1560. That same year he returned to Strasbourg, earning his doctorate in medicine in 1562. In 1564, Toxites established a laboratory in Strasbourg, where he carried out his research and experiments on antimony.

In 1574, he moved to Haguenau, where he died seven years later in 1581.

In 1574, Toxites was the first to define the alkahest as du mercure préparé pour le foie, by approximating a mysterium mercurii presented by Paracelsus as a medicine for the liver. This definition was picked up by the French Paracelsian Roch Le Baillif in 1578 and by the Belgian Gerhard Dorn in 1583. It was repeated in the dictionary which appears among the appendices of Paracelsi opera omnia (1658), the Latin edition of the works of Paracelsus.

== Works ==
Toxites edited a number of medical and alchemical works, 23 of which were the writing of Paracelsus.

- Spongia Stibii adv. Lucae Stenglini Med. D. et Physici august. aspergines. 1567.
- ed., Introductio in Divinam Chemicae Artem, integra magistri Boni Lombardi Ferrariensis physici. Basel: Pietro Perna, 1572. An edition of the Pretiosa margarita novella of Petrus Bonus.
- Onomastica duo. 1574.
- Paragraphorum Philippi Theophrasti Paracelsi. 1575.

== See also ==
- Stibnite
- Heinrich Bullinger
- Thomas Platter
