= John Hester (distiller) =

British distiller and translator

- Died: 1593
- Occupations: Distiller and translator

John Hester (died 1593) was a British distiller and translator.

== Biography ==
Hester styled himself, "practitioner in the Spagericall Arte". He carried on business at Paul's Wharf, London, from about 1579 until his death in 1593. From time to time he issued in folio sheets curious advertisements of his preparations. His recipes were purchased by James Fourestier, distiller, of Blackfriars.

Hester was author of:

- "The Pearle of Practise, or Practisers Pearle, for Phisicke and Chirurgerie. Found out by I. H(ester) … Since his death garnished and brought into some methode by a welwiller of his [J. Fourestier]," 4to, London, 1594.
- "The first (—the second) part of the Key of Philosophie. Wherein is contained most excellent secretes of Phisicke and Philosophie, divided into two bookes," 2 pts., 8vo, London, 1596.

He also made the following translations:

- "A Short Discours of … L. Phioravanti uppon Chirurgerie … Translated out of Italyan … by J. Hester," 4to, London, 1580.
- "A Compendium of the Rationall Secretes of the … moste excellent Doctour of Phisicke … L. Phioravante … devided into three Bookes" [translated and edited by I. Hester], 8vo, London, 1582.
- "An Excellent Treatise teaching howe to cure the French-Pockes: with all other diseases arising and growing thereof, and in a manner all other sicknesses. Drawne out of the Bookes of … T. Paracelsus. Compiled by … P. Hermanus, and now put into English by J. Hester," 4to, London, 1590.
- "The Sclopotarie of Iosephus Quercetanus … or His booke containing the cure of Wounds received by shot of Gunne or such like Engines of Warre. Published into English by I. Hester," 8vo, London, 1590.
- "A Breefe Aunswere of Iosephus Quercetanus … to the exposition of Iacobus Aubertus Vindonis concerning the original and causes of Mettalles. Set foorth against Chimists. Another … treatise of the same Iosephus concerning the Spagericall preparations, and use of minerall, animall, and vegitable medicines. Whereunto is added divers rare Secretes … By I. Hester," 2 pts., London, 1591, 8vo.
- "A hundred and foureteene Experiments and Cures of … Paracelsus. Translated out of the Germane tongue into the Latin. … Whereunto is added certaine … workes by B. G. à Portu Aquitano, also certaine Secrets of Isacke Hollandus concerning the Vegetall and Animall worke. Also the Spagericke Antidotarie for gunneshot of Josephus Quirsitanus, collected [and translated] by J. Hester," 4to, London, 1596.
- "A Discourse upon Chyrurgery … Translated out of Italian by J. Hester, … and now newly published and augmented, … by R. Booth," 4to, London, 1626. Hester edited: "A Joyfull Jewell. Contayning … orders, preservatives … for the Plague … written in the Italian tung by … L. Fiorovantie … and now … translated … by T. H(ill)," 4to, London [1579]. "Olde John Hester" is mentioned as a distinguished chemist in Gabriel Harvey's "Pierces Supererogation," 1593 (pp. 39, 194, of J. P. Collier's reprint).
