= John Hester =

John Hester may refer to:

- John H. Hester (1886–1976) United States Army general
- John Hester (distiller) (died 1593), British distiller and translator
- John Hester (priest) (1927–2008), British Anglican priest and chaplain
- John Hester (baseball) (born 1983), American Major League Baseball catcher
