= Melchior Cibinensis =

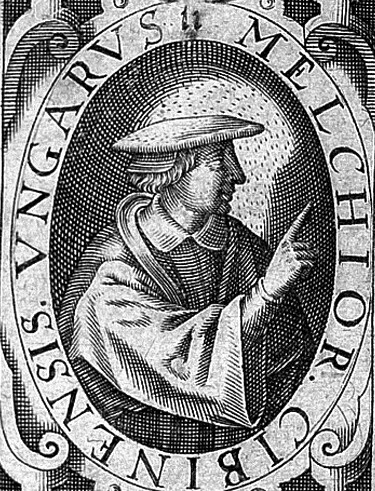
Portrait from Michael Maier's Symbola Aureae Mensae

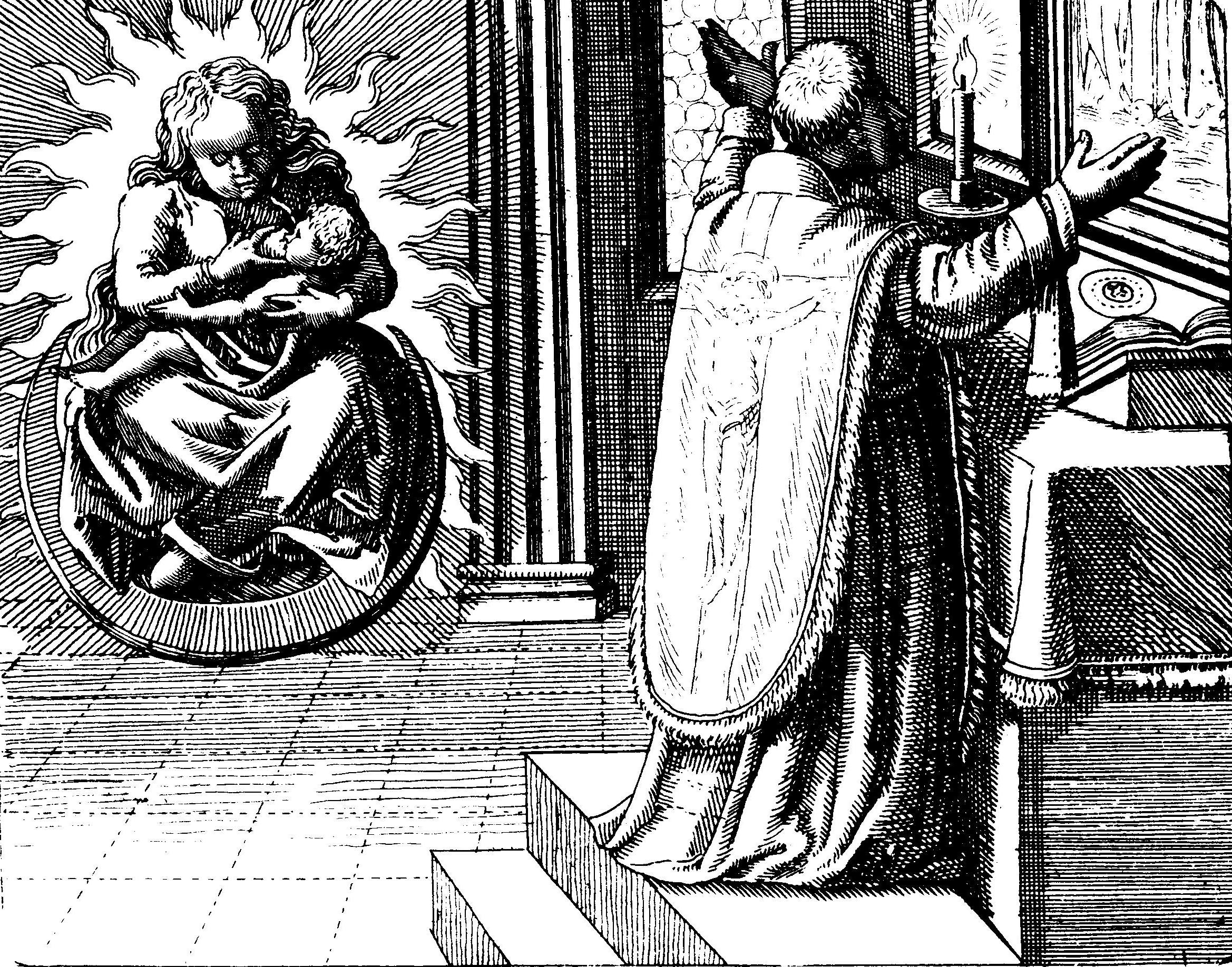
Melchior Cibinensis as pictured in Maier's Symbola Aureae Mensae

Melchior Cibinensis was a Hungarian alchemical writer active in the first part of the 16th century. He is known for the Processus sub forma missae, an alchemical mass, now dated to around 1525, through which wanted to make from alchemy a religion; it was published in the Theatrum Chemicum of 1602, and formed part of a celebrated later collection Symbola Aureae Mensae from 1617 of Michael Maier.

The identity of Melchior is still a subject of debate. The candidate proposed by Carl Jung was Nicolas Melchior Szebeni. This Nicolas was chaplain and from 1490 court astrologer to Vladislaus II of Bohemia and Hungary to whom the Processus was dedicated. It has more recently been proposed that Melchior was a pseudonym of Nicolaus Olahus. Another name given is Menyhért Miklós.
