= Adam von Bodenstein =

16th-century Swiss alchemist and physician

Adam von Bodenstein (1528–1577) was a Swiss Paracelsian alchemist and physician. He was born in Kemberg near Wittenberg in Germany and died of the plague in Basel. His father, Andreas Rudolph Bodenstein von Karlstadt, was a prominent theologian and early Protestant opponent of Martin Luther.

As the guiding force of early German Paracelsianism, Bodenstein published over forty Paracelsian titles from 1560, which had a tremendous influence on the later development of Paracelsianism. Since he published these texts without the knowledge of the Basel medical faculty, he was expelled from "Facultet und Consilio“ of the Basel University. Bodenstein also became, with Gerhard Dorn, Johannes Oporinus, and Michael Toxites, the most influential translator of the works of Paracelsus.
