= Petrus Bonus =

Italian late medieval alchemist

Petrus Bonus (Latin for "Peter the Good"; Italian: Pietro Antonio Boni) was a late medieval alchemist. He is best known for his Precious Pearl (Latin: Margarita Preciosa) or Precious New Pearl (Margarita Preciosa Novella), an influential alchemical text composed sometime between 1330 and 1339. He was said to have been a physician at Ferrara in Italy, causing him to sometimes be known as Petrus Bonus of Ferrara or as Petrus Bonus the Lombard (Petrus Bonus Lombardus). An Introduction to the Divine Art (Introductio in Divinam Chemicae Artem) is also attributed to him but was printed much later, in 1572.

== Pretiosa margarita novella ==
The text is primarily a theoretical one. The author admits to having little practical expertise and rather tries to establish alchemy on authentically philosophical grounds and to integrate it into the medieval scientific canon. In contrast to other alchemical texts of the same period, like the Pseudo-Geber's Summa Perfectionnis or pseudo-Lull's Testamentum, which promote a natural and rational vision of alchemy, for Petrus Bonus, alchemy is an art "in part natural and in part divine or super natural." ».

A fifteenth-century manuscript copy survives in the Biblioteca Estense in Modena.

The text was first printed in Venice in 1546 by Giano (Janus) Lacinio under the title Pretiosa margarita novella. This edition included commentary by Janus Lacinius, a Franciscan from Calabria, who added extracts from other alchemical authorities, including Raymond Lull, al-Rasi, Albertus Magnus, Michael Scot, Arnaldus de Villanova.

=== Editions ===
- Venice: Giano Lacinio, 1546. Repr. Nuremberg: Gabriel Hain, 1554.
- Introductio In Divinam Chemicae Artem, integra magistri Boni Lombardi Ferrariensis physici. Edited by Michael Toxites. Basel: Pietro Perna, 1572.
- In Theatrum Chemicum. 1622.
- In Bibliotheca chemica curiosa. 1702.

== Bibliography ==
- Colasanti, Marina, Bambini e alchimia. Il germoglio psichico nella Margarita Pretiosa Novella. In AA.VV., Agathodaimon. Saggi di psicología analitica. Milano: La biblioteca di Vivarium, 2002.
- Clericuzio, Antonio. "Petrus Bonus." In Alchemie: Lexikon einer hermetischen Wissenschaft, edited by Claus Priesner and Karin Figala, 270f. Beck, 1998.
- Bono, Pietro, da Ferrara (1976). Crisciani, Chiara (ed.). Preziosa Margarita Novella. Edizione del volgarizzamento, introduzione e note. Firenze: La Nuova Italia editrice.
- Crisciani, Chiara. "The Conception of Alchemy as Expressed in the “Pretiosa Margarita Novella” of Petrus Bonus of Ferrara." Ambix 20 (1973): 165-81.
- Ferguson, John. Bibliotheca Chemica, vol. 1, p. 150f. Glasgow, 1906.
- Peter Bonus, auch Lombardus. In Lexikon bedeutender Chemiker by Winfried Pötsch, Annelore Fischer, and Wolfgang Müller. Harri Deutsch, 1989.
- Ruska, Julius. "L'alchimie à l'époque du Dante." Annales Guébhard-Séverine 10 (1934): 410-17.
- Stillman, J.M. "Petrus Bonus and supposed chemical forgeries." The Scientific Monthly 16 (1923): 318-25.
- Telle, Joachim. "Bonus, Petrus, (Pietro Bono (Buono), Petrus Ferrariensis, Bonus Lombardus Ferrariensis) Mediziner und Alchemist (14. Jahrhundert)." In Lexikon des Mittelalters, vol. 2. 1983.
