= Christopher of Paris =

Italian alchemist

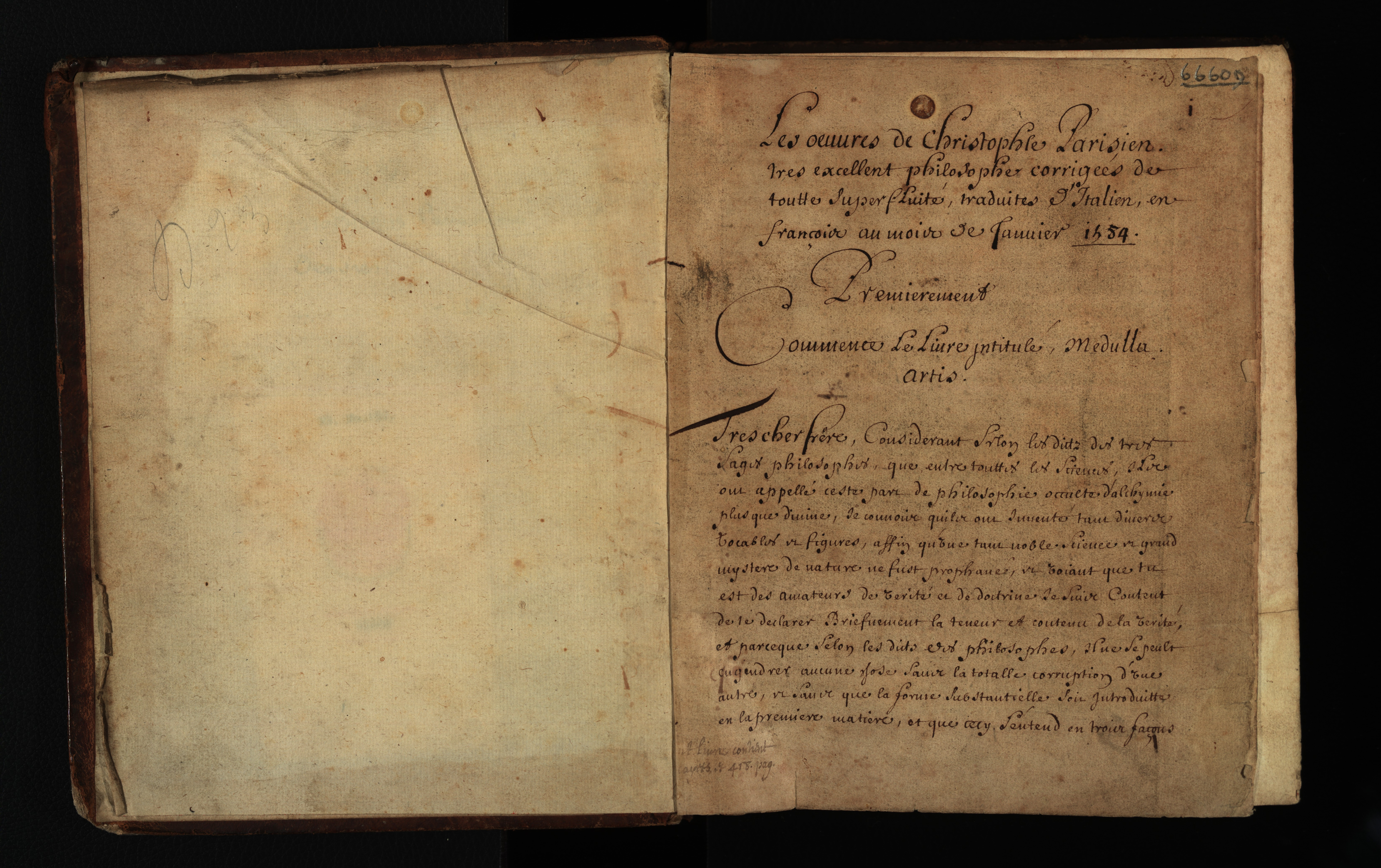
Les oeuvres de Christophle Parisien. Wellcome Library, London.

Christopher of Paris (also known as Christophe de Paris, Cristoforo Parigino, Christophorus Parisiensis) was an Italian alchemist active at the end of the fifteenth century and author of a number of treatises influenced by Pseudo-Lull. He lived in Venice and is supposed to have had contacts among local glassmakers like Angelo Barovier.

He was cited in the Theatrum Chemicum and had a good reputation among alchemists of the sixteenth and seventeenth centuries, because he was supposed to have know the secrets of the philosopher's stone.

== Works ==
The works of Christopher of Paris survive in a number of manuscript and printed copies:

- Apertorio alfabetale. Italian original, 1466 or 1476. French translation, Le grand apertorial de la philosophie chimique, preserved in Paris, Bibliothèque de l'Arsenal MS. 2518 (172 S.A.F.). The French translation was printed in Paris in 1628 as Le grand esclaircisement de la pierre philosophale and attributed to Nicolas Flamel.
- Elucidarius artis transmutatoriae metallorum summa major. Paris, 1649. German translation: Hamburg, 1697; Frankfurt, Leipzig, 1772.
- Les oeuures de Christophle Parisien, très excellent philosophe corrigées de toutte superfluité, traduites d'Italien, en françois au mois de Januier 1584. Preserved in London, Wellcome Library MS. 192 and Leiden University Library, Voss. Chym. Q3.
  - 1. Medulla artis.
  - 2. Sommette.
  - 3. Viollette.
  - 4. L'oeuure vegétale et minéralle... laquelle est apellée par l'autheur Lucidaire ou Somme majeure de l'art transmutatoire des corps des métaux.
  - 5. L'alphabet apertoire.
  - 6. La practique de notre oeuure.
- Summetta, 1478. Manuscript, Osler Library of the History of Medicine.

== Bibliography ==
- Thorndike, Lynn. History of Magic and Experimental Science. Vol. IV, pp. 348–51.
- Pereira, Michela. The alchemical corpus attributed to Raymond Lull. Warburg Institute, 1989.
- Pereira, Michela. "Alchemy and the use of vernacular languages in the late middle ages" Speculum 74, no. 2 (1999), 336-56.
