= Thorsten Grasshoff =

German actor (born 1969)

- Born: Paul Thorsten Grasshoff; 1969 (age 56–57); Berlin, West Germany
- Occupation: Actor

Thorsten Grasshoff (born 1969), is a German actor known for his work in television and film.

== Filmography ==
Year	Title	Role	Notes
2001	Swimming Pool – Der Tod feiert mit	Gregor	Feature film
2003	Motown	Pat	Feature film
2004	In aller Freundschaft	Kai Ehlers	TV series, episode role
2005	Hinter Gittern – Der Frauenknast		TV series
2006	SOKO Leipzig		TV series
2007	Berlin, Berlin		TV series
2008	In aller Freundschaft	Robert Berlitz	TV series, recurring role
2010	Tatort		TV series
2012	Alarm für Cobra 11 – Die Autobahnpolizei		TV series
2015	Der Kriminalist		TV series
