= Wilhelm Xylander =

German humanist and classical scholar (1532–1576)

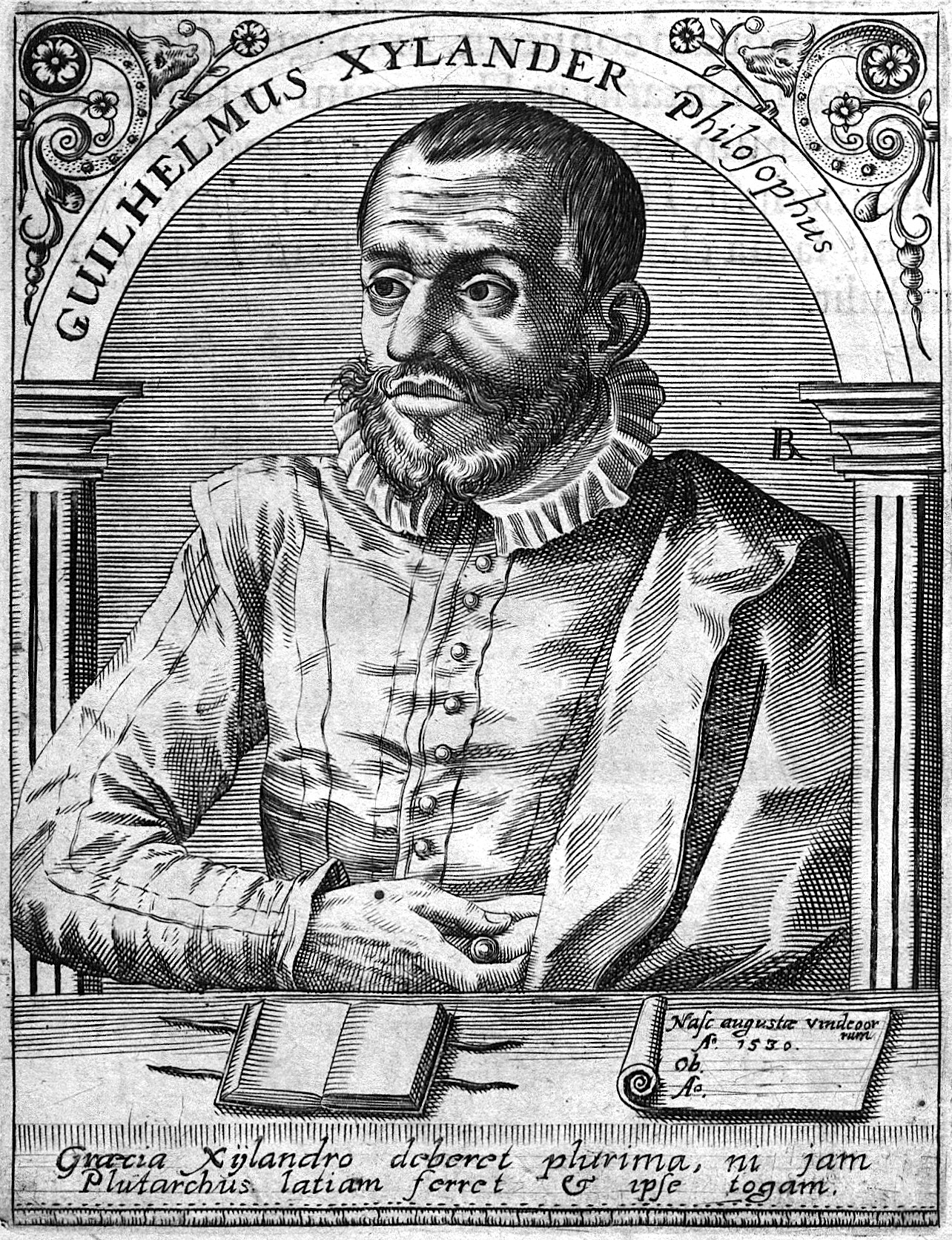
- Engraving from Bibliotheca chalcographica
- Born: 26 December 1532; Augsburg
- Died: 10 February 1576 (aged 43); Heidelberg
- Other names: Guilielmus Xylander, Wilhelm Holtzmann
- Occupation: Arts Professor
- Known for: Editio princeps of Meditations by Marcus Aurelius

Wilhelm Xylander (born Wilhelm Holtzman, graecized to Xylander; 26 December 1532 – 10 February 1576) was a German classical scholar and humanist. He served as rector of Heidelberg University in 1564.

== Biography ==
Born at Augsburg, he studied at Tübingen, and in 1558, when very short of money (caused, according to some, by his intemperate habits), he was appointed to succeed Jakob Micyllus in the professorship of Greek at the University of Heidelberg; he exchanged it for a chair of logic (publicus organi Aristotelici interpres) in 1562.

In Heidelberg church and university politics, Xylander was a close partisan of Thomas Erastus.

Xylander was the author of a number of important works, including Latin translations of Dio Cassius (1558), Plutarch (1560–1570) and Strabo (1571). He also edited (1568) the geographical lexicon of Stephanus of Byzantium; the travels of Pausanias (completed after his death by Friedrich Sylburg, 1583); the Meditations of Marcus Aurelius (1558), the editio princeps based on a Heidelberg manuscript now lost; a second edition in 1568 with the addition of Antoninus Liberalis, Phlegon of Tralles, an unknown Apollonius, and Antigonus of Carystus—all paradoxographers; and the chronicle of George Cedrenus (1566). He translated the first six books of Euclid into German with notes, the Arithmetica of Diophantus, and the De quattuor mathematicis scientiis of Michael Psellus into Latin.

He died on 10 February 1576 in Heidelberg.

== Works ==
- Marcus Aurelius, De seipso, seu vita sua, libri 12 ed. and trans. by Xylander. Zurich: Andreas Gessner, 1558.
