= Thomas Oliver (logician) =

English logican

Thomas Oliver, or Olyuer, (died 1624) was an English logician, mathematician, and physician. Oliver wrote a treatise De Sophismatum Praestigiis Cavendis Tractatus Paraeneticus in 1583, which was published in Cambridge in 1604 , and reprinted in Frankfurt in 1605. He worked in Bury St. Edmunds, and died in 1624.

== Biography ==
Oliver is said to have been educated at Cambridge. He certainly published his chief book at the university press, but his name does not figure In the university register, and no details respecting his connection with the university are accessible. Before 1597 he was settled at Bury St. Edmunds as a physician, and usually described himself as 'Buriensis Philiatros.' He practised his profession at Bury St. Edmunds until his death in 1624.

Oliver was a mathematician as well as a physician, and wrote learnedly in both capacities. In 1601 he published 'A New Handling of the Planisphere, divided into three sections … pleasant and profitable generally for all men, but especially such as would get handines in using the ruler and compasse, and desire to reape the fruits of astronomicall and geographicall documents without being at the charge of costly instruments. Invented for the most part, and first published in English, by Thomas Olyver,' London, by Felix Kyngston for Simon Waterson and Rafe Iacson, 1601, 4to. In a dedication dated from Bury St. Edmunds 6 Jan. 1600-1, and addressed to Sir John Peter of Thorndon, Essex, he acknowledges obligations to 'Clauius his Astrolabe.' Many diagrams appear in the text.

In 1604 Oliver published at the press of John Legate at Cambridge four separate tracts bound in a single volume, and usually known by the title of the first tract: 'De Sophismatum Præstigiis cavendis Admonitio,' dedicated to Henry Howard, earl of Northampton, from Bury, 23 November 1603. This tract is succeeded by 'De Rectarum Linearum Parallelismo et Concursu Doctrina Geometrica,' dedicated to Lancelot Browne, 'archiatro doctissimo,' and by 'De Missione Sanguinis in Pueris ante annum decimum quartum Diatribe medica,' dedicated to William Butler, 'medico et philosopho præstantiesimo amico suo charissimo Cantabrigiam.' The book concludes with 'De Circuli Quadratura Thesis logica,' dedicated to 'Adriano Romano equiti aurato in Academia Wurceburgensi Mathematicorum professori celeberrimo nunc medico Cæsareo,' 27 August 1697. In Addit. MS. 4626 (art. 23 or 24) are two unpublished tracts by Oliver, respectively entitled 'Thomæ Oliveri Buriensis Tabula Longitudinum et latitudinum locorum memorabilium in Europa,' and 'Mechanica Circuli quadratura cum equatione cubi et sphæeræ.'
