= Johann Grasshoff =

German alchemist

Johann Grasshoff (or Grasshof, Grasse) (c.1560 – 1623) was a Pomeranian jurist, and alchemical writer. He is recorded also as a medical advisor to Ernest of Bavaria, a Syndic, and an Episcopal counselor.

His writings include the Aperta Arca arcani artificiosissimi (1617). and a Cabala Chymica (1658).

The compilation of the 1625 Dyas chymica tripartita is also attributed to him; it includes The Golden Age Restored of Henricus Madathanus, The Book of Lambspring, of Nicolas Barnaud, and the Book of Alze.
