= Gerhard Dorn =

Alchemist and philosopher (c. 1530–1584)

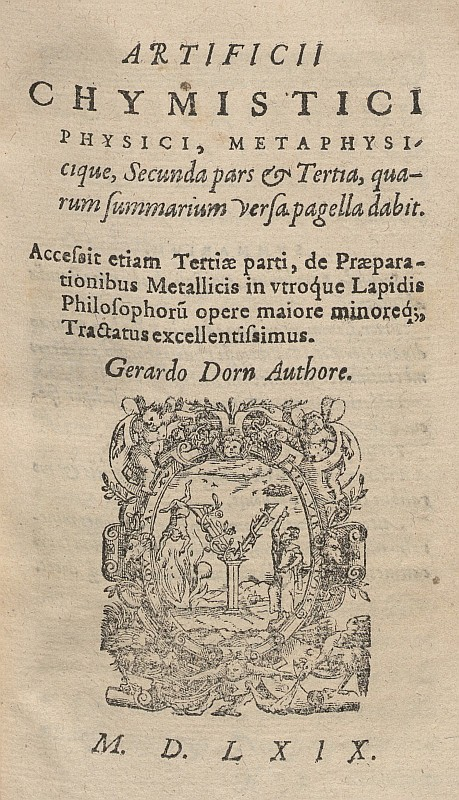

Gerhard Dorn (c. 1530 – 1584) was a philosopher, translator, alchemist, physician and bibliophile.

== Biography ==
The details of Gerhard Dorn's early life, along with those of many other 16th century personalities, are lost to history. It is known that he was born about 1530 in Mechelen, which is part of modern-day Belgium's Antwerp Province. He studied with Adam von Bodenstein, to whom his first book is dedicated and began publishing books from around 1565. He used John Dee's personal glyph from his 1564 book, the Monas Hieroglyphica, on the title page of his Chymisticum artificium.

Together with von Bodenstein, he rescued many of Paracelsus's manuscripts and printed them for the first time. He also translated many of them into Latin for the Basel publisher Pietro Perna and lived in Basel during the 1570s and Frankfurt in the early 1580s, where he died when he was in his mid-fifties.

== Philosophy ==
Dorn claimed to have found a better philosophy and a more Christian way of thinking in Paracelsus and was one of Paracelsus's strongest advocates. He depreciated practical laboratory work in favor of theoretical study of the human mind, considering the prevailing education of his day too scholastic. Like many alchemists, Dorn was hostile to the philosophy of Aristotle, with its emphasis upon the material world declaring that "whoever wishes to learn the alchemical art, let him not learn the philosophy of Aristotle but that which teaches the truth".

Dorn argued that learning needed a reform as had religion in the Reformation, as had medicine in the teachings of Paracelsus. What was needed, he asserted, was a mystical and spiritual "philosophy of love"—his radical theology claimed that it was God, not man who was in need of Redemption and he defined the alchemical opus as a labor which redeemed not man but God, a proposal which came perilously close to being heretical in the eyes of Christian orthodoxy. His principal writings are included in Volume I of the Theatrum Chemicum.

As Monika Wikman summarized in her book Pregnant Darkness, "Alchemists such as Gerhard Dorn, in his work 'The Speculative Philosophy,' referred to this next alchemical stage [inner healing] as Unus Mundus, where splits are healed, duality ceases, and the individual, the vir unus, unites with the world soul."

Dorn's writings were of great interest to the psychologist Carl Jung, enough for him to take Dorn's principal writings with him when traveling to India in 1938. He is one of Jung's most frequently quoted sources upon alchemy.

== Works ==
- Clavis totius Philosophiae Chymisticae, Lyons, 1567.
- Chymisticum artificium naturae, theoricum et practicum, Frankfurt, 1568.
- Aurorae Thesaurusque Philosophorum, Basel, 1577.
- De Naturae Luce Physica, Frankfurt, 1583.
- Dictionarium Paracelsi, Frankfurt, 1583.

Gerhard Dorn, De vita lonia libri V, studio Ger. Dornei commentarius illustrati, 1583

== Sources ==
- Theatrum Paracelsicum: Prefaces and Dedications written by Gerhard Dorn
- Quotation from Theatrum Chemicum (vol.1 Speculative Philosophy)
- Gerhard Dorn, Paul Ferguson, Adam McLean. The Speculative Philosophy of Gerhard Dorn. Glasgow.
- Joel Blackstock, Gerhard Dorn: Alchemist, Philosopher, Visionary
