= Joost Balbian =

Dutch physician, banker and alchemist

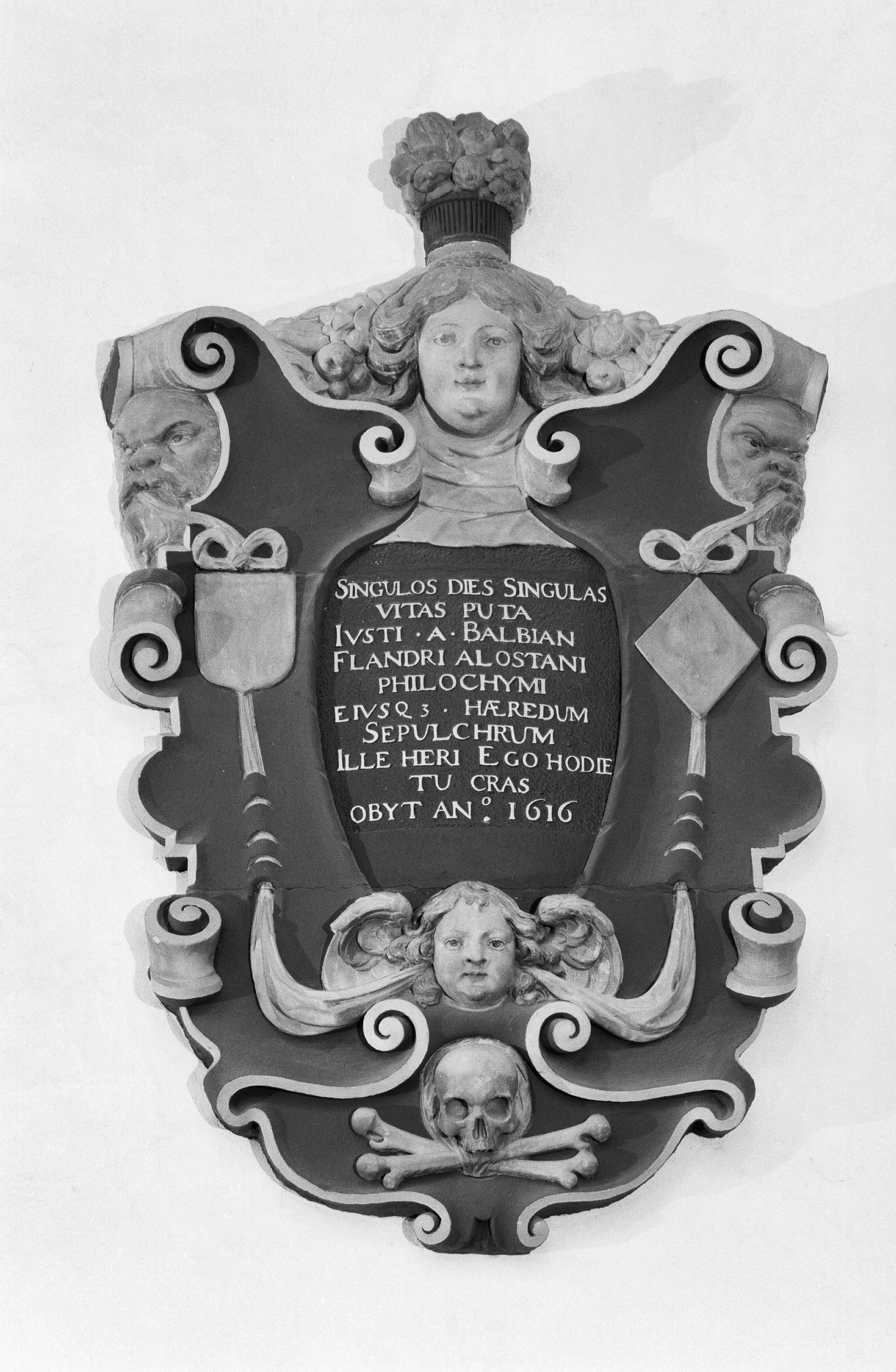
- Epitaph for Balbian in the Sint Janskerk in Gouda, South Holland
- Born: Justus Balbian; August 10, 1543; Aalst, Belgium
- Died: May 2, 1616 (aged 73); Gouda, South Holland
- Medical career
- Profession: Physician/Alchemist

Justus Balbian (August 10, 1543 - May 2, 1616), also known as "Joost", "Joos", and "Jodocus" was a Dutch physician and alchemist.

== Life and work ==
Balbian was born in Aalst, habsburg Netherlands on August 10, 1543, and was the son of tableholder Giovanni Andreas Balbian (1506-1568) and Anna Joost Van Gavere (1516-1573) of Piedmont. Balbian was raised in Aalst and Ghent. He studied law in Heidelberg and Orléans, and possibly Italy. After his studies, he returned to Ghent where he married Josina Fouasse on November 8, 1569. Eight of his children came from this marriage. He distanced himself and from the Catholic faith and joined the Calvinists in Ghent. Within the newly formed Calvinist Republic of Ghent, he was captain of a company on infantry from 1577 to 1584. After the capture of Ghent by the Spaniards, he was imprisoned for over a year. Balbian then moved to the Northern Netherlands and settled in Delft.

His wife died on May 19, 1588, and he remarried on July 2, 1596, in Dordrecht with Janneke Claes Vinkendr. They settled in Gouda and had another eight children. In 1608, he was referred to as a physician in Gouda. He was named this by the city council, who then gave him an exemption from city taxes. In 1611, he was officially appointed as the city physician as the successor for the previous physician who had died earlier that year. In 1612 he obtained full citizenship in Gouda.

Balbian also loved alchemy. He accumulated a very extensive collection of alchemical writings over the years. He meticulously described the works he collected. His manuscript on alchemy is in the collection of the British Library. He also edited two alchemy books. Both were published by Christoffel van Rafelingen in Leiden. The first work, written in 1599, was titled "Tractatus Septum" or "The Seven Tracts" contains seven tracts surrounding the philosopher's stone, taken from the ancient manuscript. In the second book, among other things, the secrets of Jodocus Greverus (Balbian's Latin name) and statements by the philosopher Alanus van Rijsel about the Philosopher's Stone are represented. Balbian believed that "Alchemy was a science, which was a gift from God, but accessible only to a limited group who were able to grasp the not freely accessible matter." (Translated by Vaughn Adams.)

Balbian died on May 2, 1616, at the age of 72 in his hometown of Gouda. He was buried six days later in the Sint Janskerk in Gouda, South Holland. According to Volgens Muylwijk, he was not buried at the church, but in the cemetery, because he belonged to the Counter-Remonstrants. After the Remonstrants "had had to leave the field", Balbian would, according to Muylwijk, be reburied more than five years later in the Sint Janskerk. The former Archivist of the Reformed Municipality of Gouda, Henny Van Dolder de Wit, showed on the basis of the grave book of the church and the chamber book of Gouda that Muylwijk's reading is incorrect. According to Van Dolder de Wit, Balbian bought the grave in early 1616 and was buried there on May 8. Above his grave, an epitaph is mounted, presumably written by Gregorious Cool. In the text of the epitaph, his love for alchemy is referenced. Balbian was succeeded as the city physician by Martinus Herculanus Bloncq. There is also an epitaph of Bloncq in the Sint Janskerk.

== External sources ==
- Tractatus septem de lapide philosophico, Leiden, 1599
- Jodoci Greveri Secretum et Alani Philisophi Dicta De Lapide Philosophico, Leiden, 1599

Books

- Bik, J.G.W.F. Vijf eeuwen medisch leven in een Hollandse stad, Assen, 1955
- Dolder-de Wit, Henny van, Het epitaaf van doctor Joost Balbian in "De Sint-Janskerk in Gouda, blz. 11 t/m 113, Delft, 2013
- Gijsen, Annelies van, Joos Balbian en de Steen Der Wijzen: De Alchemistische Nalatenschap Van Een Zestiende-Eeuwse Arts, Leuven, 2004
- Muylwijk, P.D. Waarom dokter Balbian tweemaal begraven en waarom zijn dochter met oogenblikkelijke verbanning bedreigd werd in "Eerste verzameling bijdragen Die Goude", 1934
- Rietema, L.J., De Goudse Balbians, in "Jaarboek Centraal Bureau voor Genealogie, deel 39, blz. 147 t/m 158, 1985
