= Nicolas Barnaud =

French alchemist

Nicolas Barnaud (1538–1604) was a French Protestant writer, physician and alchemist, from Crest, in Dauphiné, from which he took the name Delphinas (or Delphinus). He was a member of the Monarchomaques.

Barnaud is associated with a number of mysteries. His 1597 collection Commentariolum in Aenigmaticum quoddam Epitaphium, on the Aelia Laelia Crispis puzzle inscription, included the alchemical Mass of Nicholas Melchior, still of disputed authorship. The 1599 Triga chemica: de lapide philosophico tractatus tres was the first publication of the Book of Lambspring, by the unknown Abraham Lambspring.

Other works are the collection Quadriga aurifera of 1599, and De Occulta philosophia (1601).

Barnaud traveled widely around the turn of the seventeenth century. This has led to suggestions that he was setting up some sort of hermetic network, on the fabled lines of the Rosicrucians.

Nicolas Barnaud is supposed to have lodged with Tadeáš Hájek, during a stay in Prague in the 1580s or 1590s, meeting Anselmus de Boodt (1550-1632). He has been unreliably connected with accounts of John Dee and Edward Kelley in Prague.

Earlier in life he played an itinerant role as a Calvinist activist, in Geneva and Holland. Pamphleteering works of politics and satire Le reveille-matin des François et de leurs voisins, which first published the Discourse on Voluntary Servitude by Étienne de La Boétie and the Le Cabinet du roy de France and Le miroir des Francois of 1581, under the name Nicolas de Montand or Montant, are often attributed to him.
