= Isaac and Johann Isaac Hollandus =

English divine

- Occupation: Alchemists

Isaac and Johann Isaac Hollandus were a 17th-century pseudonymous Dutch alchemist duo. It is not clear if they were father-and-son, brothers, or even the same person. The last part of their pseudonym, "Hollandus", simply referred to their home country of Holland. Some believed they were Jews, and have given this as a reason as to why they stayed anonymous. Isaac and Johann wrote "De Triplici Ordinari Exiliris et Lapidis Theoria" and "Mineralia Opera Sue de Lapide Philosophico".

They were originally believed to be from the 14th or 15th century, predating Paracelsus. They were among the most famous alchemists in Europe at one point in time. Johann von Löwenstern-Kunckel stated that "the incomparable Isaac Hollandus" "had more knowledge in his little finger than Van Helmont in his whole body". However, Isaac and Johann Isaac Hollandus fell out of favor in the early 20th century after it was concluded they were actually post-Paracelsus.
