= Anglicus =

Anglicus is the Latin term to refer to someone or something from England.

Anglicus may refer to:

== Persons ==
- Adam of Dryburgh (c. 1140–1212), Anglo-Scottish theologian, writer and Premonstratensian and Carthusian monk sometimes called Adam Anglicus
- Alfred of Sareshel (12th-13th centuries), English translator also known as Alfredus Anglicus
- Bartholomeus Anglicus (1203–1272), scholastic scholar of Paris and member of the Franciscan order
- Gilbertus Anglicus (1180–1250), English physician
- Gualterus Anglicus (fl. 1175), Anglo-Norman poet writing in Latin who produced a seminal version of Aesop's Fables
- John Foxal (c. 1415–1474), English Franciscan theologian, philosopher and prelate who served as the archbishop of Armagh and primate of Ireland sometimes called Ioannes Anglicus
- Pope Joan, legendary female Pope also known as John Anglicus
- Ricardus Anglicus (alchemist) (14th century)
- Ricardus Anglicus (medical writer) (fl. c. 1180), English doctor and author of medical texts
- Richard de Morins (d. 1242), canonist, called Ricardus Anglicus
- Richard of Wendover (d. 1252), physician, called Ricardus Anglicus
- Robert (bishop of Olomouc), ruled 1201–40 sometimes referred to as Robert Anglicus
- Robert Kilwardby, archbishop of Canterburgy (1272–78) sometimes referred to as Robert Anglicus
- Robert of Chester, 12th-century Arabist sometimes referred to as Robert Anglicus
- Robert of Retines, 12th-century Arabist and theologian sometimes referred to as Robert Anglicus
- Robertus Anglicus, English astronomer of the 13th century
- Roger Marston (d. c. 1303), English Franciscan scholastic philosopher and theologian, sometimes referred to as Rogerus Anglicus
- Simon of Faversham or Simon Anglicus (c. 1260–1306), English medieval scholastic philosopher and university chancellor
- Thomas of Sutton or Thomas Anglicus (died after 1315), English theologian

== Taxonomic species ==
- Apsopelix anglicus, a specices of the Apsopelix gnus of ray-finned fish
- Archaeodromus anglicus, a species of the Archaeodromus genus of birds
- Bibio anglicus, a species of fly from the family Bibionidae
- Brontoscorpio anglicus, a species of the Brontoscorpio genus of scorpion
- Chrysoblephus anglicus (a.k.a. the Englishman seabream), a species of marine ray-finned fish
- Iguanodon anglicus, a species of the Iguanodon genus of dinosaurs
- Inoceramus anglicus, a species of the Inoceramus genus of bivalves
- Onychodus anglicus, a species of the Onychodus genus of lobe-finned fish
- Parailurus anglicus, a species of the Parailurus genus of mammals
- Pterygotus anglicus, a species of the Pterygotus genus of eurypterid
- Ptomacanthus anglicus, a species of the Ptomacanthus genus of spiny shark
- Spheniscus anglicus, a species of banded penguin
- Sporobolus anglicus (a.k.a. common cordgrass), a hybrid-derived species of cordgrass
- Weygoldtina anglica (synonym: Graeophonus anglicus), a species of the Weygoldtina genus of scorpion

== Other ==
- Sweating sickness, a disease that affected England between 1485 and 1551 also known as sudor anglicus
