= Ricardus Anglicus =

Ricardus Anglicus or Richardus Anglicus (also Richard the Englishman or Richard of England) may refer to:

- Ricardus Anglicus (medical writer) (fl. 1180)
- Richard de Morins (d. 1242), canonist, called Ricardus Anglicus
- Richard of Wendover (d. 1252), physician, called Ricardus Anglicus
- Ricardus Anglicus (alchemist) (14th century)

== See also ==
- Richard of England (disambiguation)
