= Alphidius =

14th-century Arabic-language writer

Alphidius, also known as Asfidus, Alfidius, Alvidius, is the author name of an unknown, probably medieval Arab alchemist. Nothing is known about him, except some citations and his writings in the 14th century.

His allegorical symbolism influenced the picture imagination of both the alchemical manuscripts known as Splendor Solis and Lamspring. He is also quoted both directly and indirectly in the early Renaissance alchemical manuscript Aurora Consurgens which cites Alphidius on various accounts : Alphidius says men and children pass by Wisdom on the roads and on the streets and that She is trampled underfoot every day by pack animals and livestocks. or For the science of God shall never perish, as Alphidius attests it. He indeed says : ″Should anyone find this science, it will be for him a rightful and eternal nourishment.″

An alchemist by the name of Alphidius also appears in the dialogue form Rosarium Philosophorum (first printed in De Alchemia). According to Karl Christoph Schmieder there's a handwriting in Latin "claves de quinque lapide philosophico et alia fragmenti de lapide philosophico Componendo" from an Alphidius in the library of San Lorenzo Monastery in El Escorial. The age is unknown to Schmieder, since an Alphidius is also mentioned in the Turba Philosophorum, but he suspects that it may be classified in the Middle Ages (12th century or earlier).

According to Buntz, he is possibly identical to the Asfidus mentioned by Ibn Umail.

He was often confused with another Arab alchemist known as Artephius.

== Sources ==
- Joachim Telle: Alphidius. In: Verfasserlexikon. 2004, Line 11, column 72–75
- Herwig Buntz: Alphidius. In: Lexikon des Mittelalters. Line 1, 1977, Column 458
