= Gaddesden =

Gaddesden may refer to:

== People ==
- John of Gaddesden, English physician

== Places in Hertfordshire, England ==
- Great Gaddesden, a village
  - Gaddesden Place, a country house in the village
- Little Gaddesden, a village
