= Guglielmo Gratarolo =

Italian doctor and alchemist (1516–1568)

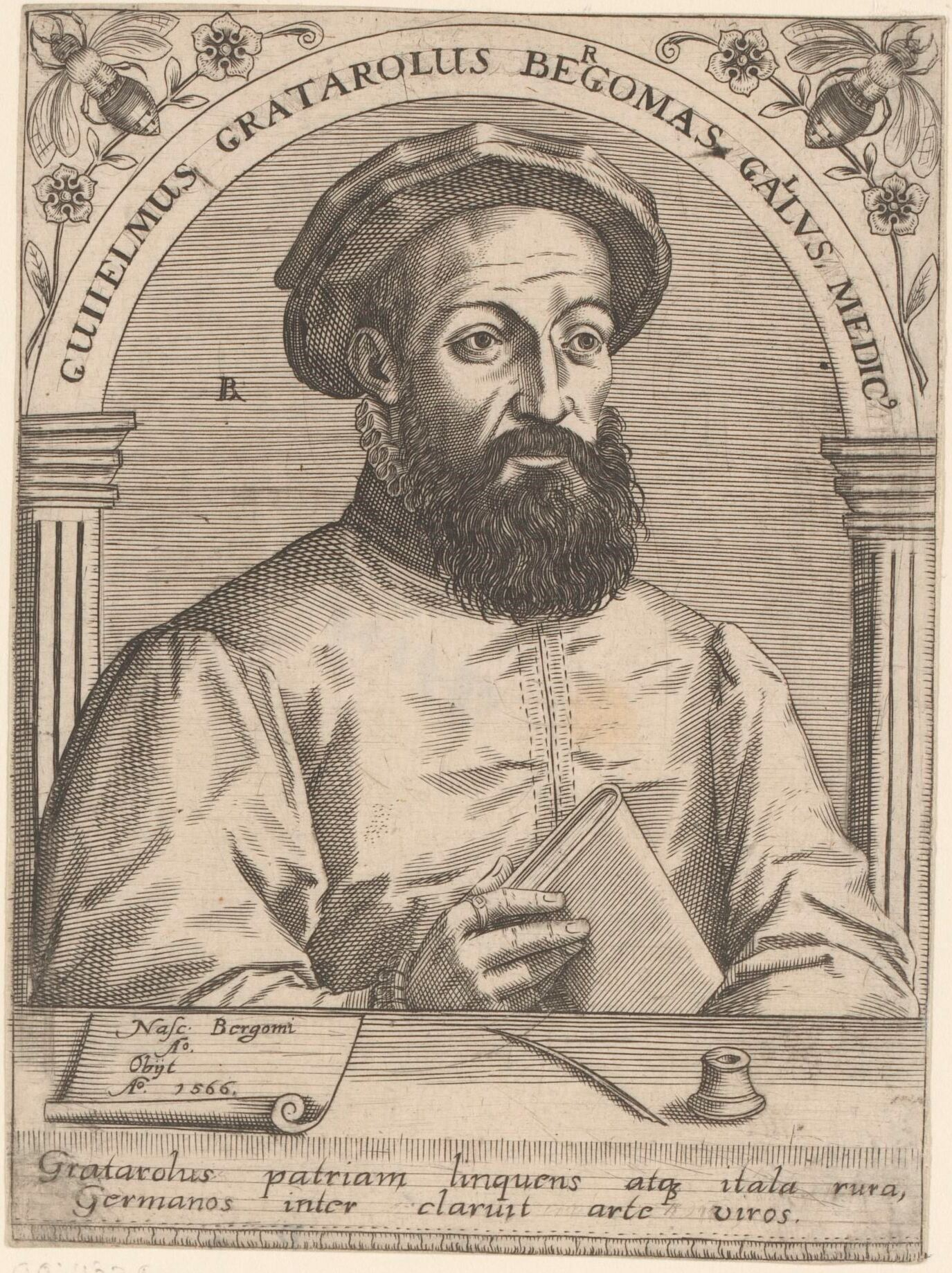
Guglielmo Grataroli

Guglielmo Gratarolo or Grataroli or Guilelmus Gratarolus (16 May 1516, Bergamo – 16 April 1568, Basel) was an Italian doctor and alchemist.

== Biography ==
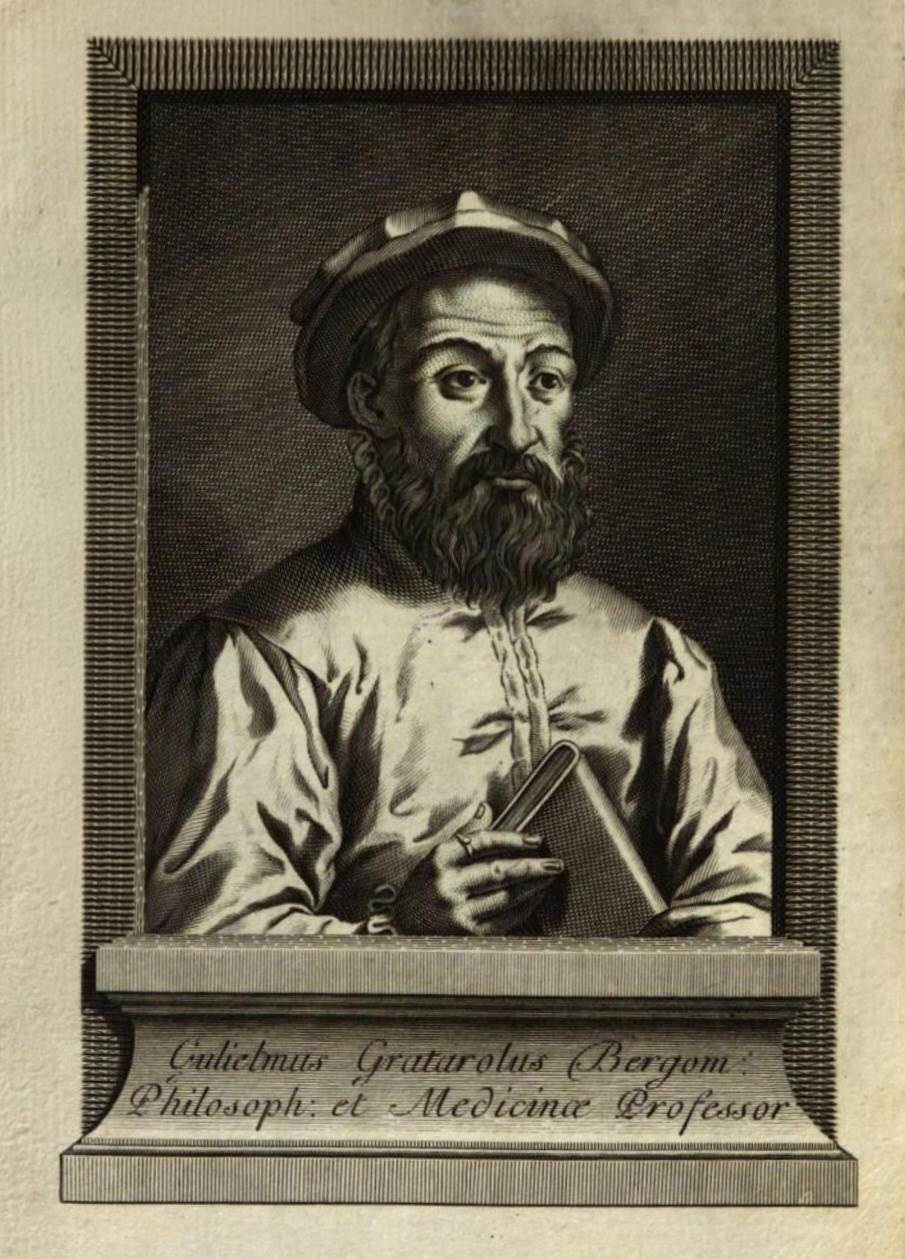
Portrait of Grataroli from a biography by G. Gallizioli, 1788

Gratorolo studied in Padua and Venice.

A Calvinist, Gratarolo sought refuge in Graubünden, Strasbourg, and finally settled in Basel in 1552. There, he taught medicine and edited a number works, particularly alchemical ones, notable among them the 1561 collection Verae alchemiae artisque metallicae published by the printer Henricus Petrus, and reprinted in 1572.

== Verae alchemiae artisque metallica ==
Verae alchemiae artisque metallica relied heavily on the earlier printed alchemical collection De Alchemia and was in turn heavily relied upon for the Theatrum Chemicum. Gratorolo omitted only the Tabula Smaragdina and Ortulanus' commentary on it from volume 1; these had been published separately a year earlier in 1560, although falsely attributed to Johannes de Garlandia. Above all, Gratorolo wanted to publish the works of Pseudo-Lull and Pseudo-Geber. The contents of the 1561 edition are as follows:.

Volume 1:

- Chrysorrhoas, sive De Arte Chymica Dialogus
- Giovanni Bracesco, Dialogus Ioannis Braccschi, cui titulus est Lignum vitae, in quo etiam Gebri Philosophi expositio succincta continentur
- In eundem Braceschuni Gebri interpretem, animadversio, authore loanne Tauladano
- Pseudo-Geber, De investigatione perfectionis
- Pseudo-Geber, Summa perfectionis
- Pseudo-Geber, De inventione veritatis sive perfectionis
- Pseudo-Geber, Liber Fornacum
- Roger Bacon, Rogerii Bachonis De Alchemia libellus cui titulum fecit. Speculum Alchemiae
- Richardus Anglicus, Richardi Anglici Libellus peri Chemeias, cui titulum fecit, Correctorium
- Rosarius minor
- Khalid ibn Yazid, Liber Secretorum Alchemiae compositus per Calid, filium Iazichi
- Loci aliquot practiciae ex Gebero declatali per... Joannen Braceschum Vrceanum

Volume 2:

- Liber de Magni lapidis Compositione et Operatione, Authore adhuc incerto
- Sententia Ioannis Baptistae Montani, de sublimatione
- Pseudo-Arnaldus de Villa Nova, Rosarius philosophorum Arnaldi de Villanova
- Novum lumen eiusdem vel alterius
- Pseudo-Arnaldus de Villa Nova, Epistola Magistri Arnaldi de Villa nova super Alchymiam ad regem Neapolitanum
- Liber perfecti Magisteri, qui Lumen Luminum nuncupatur... vocatur etiam Flos florum Arnaldi de Villanova, longe correctior & melior hactenus impressis
- Pseudo-Arnaldus de Villa Nova, Practica Magistri Arnaldi de Villanova, ad quendam Papam, ex libro dicto, Breviarius librorum Alchymiae
- Pseudo-Albertus Magnus Alberti Magni Ratisponensis episcopi de Alchymia liber integerrimus
- Pseudo-Albertus Magnus, Scriptum Alberti super Arborem Aristotelis
- Pseudo-Lull, Apertorium Raymundi Lullii De veri lapidis compositione
- Pseudo-Lull, Ars intellectiva ejusdem super Lapidem Philosophorum
- Pseudo-Lull, Practica ejusdem
- Pseudo-Lull, Idem de intentione Alchimistarum
- Pseudo-Lull, Ejusdem Summaria Lapidis Consideratio et eius abbreviationes
- Pseudo-Lull, Ejusdem Libellus utilissimus de Mercurio solo
- Liber experimentorum
- Pulcherrimum opus de transmutatione metallorum
- Capitulum valde magnum in albedine, & omnibus nobilius, ex libro qui dicitur Philosophus mirabilis
- Liber Mercuriorum Raymundi Lullii
- Intentio summaria, quae aliter dicitur Repertorium, valde utilis ad intelligentiam Testamenti, Codicilli & aliorum librorum Raymundi Lullii
- Aristotelis de Perfecto Magisterio exquisitum & integerrimum opus, &c.
- Libellus duodecim aquarum, ex libro Emanuelis
- Aquae rubeae Avicennas ad tingendum quatuor spiritus sublimatos albos
- Elixiriorum varia compositio & modus
- John of Rupescissa, Joannis de Rupescissa liber de confectione ver Lapidis Philosophorum
- Johannes Ferrarius, De lapide Philosophorum secundum verum modum formando Efferarii monachi
- Thesaurus Philosophiae
- Pseudo-Lull, Praxis universalis Magni operis, ex Raymundo
- De lapidis philosophorum formatione epilogus
- Practica Magistri Odomari ad discipulum
- Arcanum Philosophorum, ut ex Saturno facias aurum perfectum
- Perfecta Salis communis praeparatio ad lapidem philosophorum
- Historiola Antiqua de Argento in aurum verso
- Tractatus de Marchasita, ex qua fit Elixir ad album verissimum
- Caput de sale alchali
- Quaestio an Lapis philosophicus valcat contra pestem,;
- Velus Epistola doctiss. de Metallorum materia, & artis imititatione
- Practica Caravantis Hispani
- Lapidis Philosophici Nomenclaturae, & Gulielmo Gratarolo collectae
- Giovanni Aurelio Augurello, Ioannis Aurelii Augurelli Chrysopoeiae libri iii., et Geronticon Liber i
- Regimina Artis

== Works ==
- De Memoria Reparanda, Augenda, Servandaque. Andream Gesner. F. & Rodolphum Vuyssenbachium, 1553; Reprint by Kessinger Publishing, 2009.
- Regimen omnium iter agentium. 1556.
- Verae alchemiae artisque metallicae, citra aenigmata, doctrina. Basel: Heinrich Petri et Pietro Perna, 1561.
- Pestis descriptio, causa signa omnigena et praeservatio. Paris: Federicus Morellus, 1561. on gallica
- Regimen omnium iter agentium, postremo editum. Wendelinum Rihelium, 1563.

== Bibliography ==
- Gallizioli, Giovambattista (1788). Della vita degli studi e degli scritti di Gulielmo Grataroli filosofo e medico (in Italian). Bergamo: Stamperia Locatelli.
- Maclean, Ian. "Heterodoxy in Natural Philosophy and Medicine: Pietro Pomponazzi, Guglielmo Gratarolo, Girolamo Cardano," in Heterodoxy in Early Modern Science and Religion, edited by John Brooke and Ian Maclean. Oxford: Oxford University Press, 2005.
