= Richard of England =

Richard of England may refer to:

- Richard I of England (1157–1199), King of England from 1189
- Richard II of England (1367–c. 1400), King of England from 1377 to 1399
- Richard III of England (1452–1485), King of England from 1483

== See also ==
- King Richard (disambiguation)
- Prince Richard (disambiguation)
- Ricardus Anglicus (disambiguation)
