= Ricardus Anglicus (medical writer) =

English medical writer

Ricardus Anglicus (fl. c. 1180) was an English doctor and author of medical texts.

== Identity ==
Formerly he was thought to be the same person as Richard of Wendover, but, according to Faye Getz, this now seems unlikely.

The name Ricardus Anglicus, in the context of the middle ages, is ambiguous, because it is merely the Latin for "Richard from England". He should not be confused with the English lawyer and cleric Richard de Morins (c. 1161–1242), who was also known as Richardus Anglicus, nor with the bishop Richard Poore (died 1237) who was also (falsely) referred to by that name.

== Life ==
Ricardus Anglicus, cleric and medical doctor, wrote a compendium of medicine, entitled Micrologus, while at the University of Montpellier, on the instructions of Lancelinus de l'Isle-Adam, who was deacon of Beauvais from 1178 to 1190. From this we know that the work was not completed after 1190, which excludes Richard of Wendover as the author. Further evidence comes from Gilles de Corbeil (died 1224), also a professor in Montpellier and author of works on urine and the pulse, who writes positively of a doctor "Richardus senior" in Montpellier, but who does not call him "Anglicus".

The Micrologus has not survived complete, but various texts identified with the name Ricardus Anglicus appear to be parts of it. There are also further medical texts distributed under his name whose relationship to the Micrologus is doubtful.

The Micrologus belongs to an early stage of mediaeval medical texts. These tend to be collections of practical instructions, derived from literature, rather than the theoretical texts found in later medical scholarship, influenced by Avicenna. The text recommends plant-based medicines. The great number of extant manuscripts of the Micrologus is evidence of its popularity.

The author of the Micrologus was well-travelled; he mentions time spent in Bologna (though the text may refer to Poland), Montpellier, and Spoleto. It is possible that he was also at the court of the Pope. Gilbertus Anglicus, also an English author of medical texts, admired him greatly, describing him as the most learned and experienced of all doctors. It is possible, however, that Gilbertus Anglicus was merely repeating the opinion of Gilles de Corbeil, about whom he had also written, and that Gilbertus did not know Ricardus personally.

== Works ==
Manuscripts

- Micrologus Magistri Ricardi Anglici (a medical encyclopaedia compiled from Greek and Arabic authors, not extant in its entirety; Anatomia and :Practica are parts of it)
- Practica
- Anatomia
- De Signis prognosticis oder Signa Medicinalia (deals with fevers, pulse, amongst other medical symptoms; therefore also exists as separate parts, De Pulsibus, De Signis Febrium, De Crisi)
- De modo conficiendi et medendi
- De Phlebotomia
- De Urinis
- Repressiva
- Tabulæ cum commentario Joannis de Sancto Paulo
- Liber Ricardi
- Practica sive Medicamenti Ricardi

Modern editions

- Julius Florian (editor): Die „Anatomia“ des Magisters Richardus („Anatomia“). Verlag Jungfer, Breslau, 1875.

== Bibliography ==
- Karl Sudhoff: Wiener Cod. lat. 1634 und die „Anatomia Ricardi Anglici“. In: Archiv für Geschichte der Medizin, Vol. 8 (1914/15), p. 71.
  - additionally Karl Sudhoff: Richard der Engländer. In: Janus 28, 1924, pp. 397–403.
- Herbert Hellriegel, Erich Frers: Die „Practica“ aus dem Micrologus Richards des Engländers. Institut für Geschichte der Medizin (Institute for the History of Medicine), University of Leipzig 1934. (Two dissertations written under the supervision of Karl Sudhoff).
- Hermann Heinrich Beusing: Leben und Werk des Richardus Anglicus samt einem erstmaligen Abdruck seiner Schrift "Signa". Medizinische Dissertation Leipzig, 1922.
- Faye Getz: Richard of Wendover (d. 1252), Oxford Dictionary of National Biography, 2004 (the second part of the article deals with Ricardus Anglicus, under the alternative spelling Richardus Anglicus (active 1180)).
