= Salomon Trismosin =

Legendary Renaissance alchemist and teacher of Paracelsus

Solomon or Salomon Trismosin (Note: Other variations include Trismosinus and Trissmosin.) (fl. late 15th – early 16th century) was a legendary Renaissance alchemist, claimed possessor of the philosopher's stone and teacher of Paracelsus. He is best known as the author of the alchemical works Splendor Solis and Aureum Vellus.

== Biography ==
Little is known about Trismosin's life beyond the legendary tales of his journeys found in works attributed to him. These tales, according to historian of religion J. Peter Södergård, had little value other than providing an "aura of historicity" to the texts attributed to him. The name Salomon Trismosin is also likely a pseudonym. Occultist Franz Hartmann claimed the actual name of Trismosin was "Pfieffer" (though he provides no evidence for this claim) and historian Stephen Skinner identifies him with Ulrich Poysel, who was a teacher of Paracelsus. Most of the source for his life comes from a short autobiography written in Aureum Vellus.

He is said to have begun his interest in alchemy when observing an alchemist and miner named Flocker perform an alchemical operation that allegedly transmuted lead into gold. The miner died shortly after, never revealing his secret to the young Trismosin. This led to a lifelong search for such alchemical secrets.

Trismosin writes that in 1473 he set out on a journey to find a true alchemist. He found only frauds and fools claiming to have transmuted base metals into silver and gold, which put him off his search for some time. Having abandoned his search, he came to a college in Venice where he met a German alchemist named Tauler. Tauler taught Trismosin his alchemical secrets and Trismosin learned how to transmute mercury into gold.

Patronized by a local nobleman, Trismosin continued these transmutational experiments until the nobleman died in a hurricane. Later Trismosin learned the secret of duplication. He apparently later went to a place "where kabbalistic and magical books in the Egyptian language were entrusted to me". He followed in a medieval Christian tradition of alchemists reporting their travels to the East, where they learned ancient and esoteric secrets of alchemy.

Paracelsus records that he met Trismosin in Constantinople in 1520 and was instructed in the art of alchemy. Little else is known of their meeting, but Trismosin is best known today for his mentoring of Paracelsus.

Trismosin is said to have been in possession of the panacea and, according to Hartmann, was last seen alive by a French traveller at the end of the 17th century.

== Work ==
=== Aureum Vellus ===
Aureum Vellus is a Latin collection of treatises on alchemy attributed to Trismosin. The earliest version of the book was printed in 1598 in Rorschach, Switzerland; it was translated into French by an "L. I" in 1612 as La Toyson d'Or and translated from French into English by William Backhouse as The Golden Fleece (Ashm. MS 1395). The collection contains the earliest printed edition of Splendor Solis (see below) along with a short autobiography of Trismosin (which is the source for much of Trismosin's life) among other treatises. The book popularized many concepts from the Rosarium Philosophorum in Europe.

=== Splendor Solis ===
Splendor Solis is an alchemical treatise. It was first printed in Aureum Vellus as part of a larger collection but is best known from a manuscript edition of c. 1582. The manuscript consists of 100 pages of German text interspersed with 22 large allegorical illuminations. The illuminations are steeped in symbolism and their specific meanings are not known. Several are suspected to depict esoteric alchemical processes, possibly for the creation of the philosopher's stone.
