= De Alchemia =

Alchemical writing by Johannes Petreius

De Alchemia is an early collection of alchemical writings first published by Johannes Petreius in Nuremberg in 1541. A second edition was published in Frankfurt in 1550 by the printer Cyriacus Jacobus.

The full title reads: De Alchemia. Opuscula complura veterum philosophorum. Among the texts are the important alchemical works the Rosarium Philosophorum, presented with illustrations in the second edition (1550); the Summa Perfectionis of Pseudo-Geber; and the Tabula Smaragdina of Hermes Trismegistus.

The Rosarium Philosophorum is itself an alchemical collection, taking the form of a (florilegium), or a collection of citations of earlier alchemical authorities, among them Khalid ibn Yazid, Pseudo-Arnaldus of Villa Nova, Alphidius, and Pseudo-Lull) and which includes verses explaining the preparation of the Philosopher's stone accompanied by allegorical illustrations, which depict, for example, the union of the male and female principles. The collection is preserved in many manuscript copies and comes perhaps from the end of the fourteenth or the beginning of the fifteenth century (some even date it to the sixteenth century).

In the 1541 edition, Petraeus called for the printing of further alchemical texts. This started a period of publishing alchemical collections in large numbers, among them the Artis Auriferae, Verae alchemiae artisque metallicae, citra aenigmata, doctrina and culminating in the Theatrum Chemicum.

== Contents of 1541 edition ==
- Geber (Pseudo-Geber). De investigatione perfectionis metallorum, Liber I.
- Geber. Summæ perfectionis metallorum, sive perfecti magisterij, Libri II.
- Geber. De inventione veritatis seu perfectionis metallorum. Liber I.
- Geber. De fornacibus construendis. Liber I.
- (Roger Bacon). Speculum alchemi, Rogerij Bachonis.
- (Richardus Anglicus). Correctorium alchemiæ Richardi Anglici.
- Rosarius minor, de alchemia, incerti authoris
- (Khalid ibn Yazid). Liber secretorum alchemiæ Calidis filij Iazichi Iudæi.
- (Hermes Trimegistus). Tabula smaragdina de alchemia
- (Ortulanus). Hortulani philosophi, super Tabulam smaragdinam Hermetis commentarius.

== Contents of 1550 edition ==
Part 1:

- Correctio Fatuorum.
- Clangor Buccinæ.
- Semita Semitæ.
- (Pseudo-Avicenna). De tinctura metallorum.
- (Pseudo-Lull). Compendium animæ transmutationis.
- Scala Philosophorum.
- Opus mulierum, Tractatulus, sive ludus puerorum.
- (Pseudo-Lull). De Tincturis compendium, seu Vade Mecum.
- (Pseudo-Aristotle). Tractatulus de Practica lapidis Philosophici.

Part 2:

- Rosarium Philosophorum

== Bibliography ==
- Ferguson, John. Bibliotheca Chemica, vol. 1. Glasgow, 1906.
