= Giovanni Battista Gallizioli =

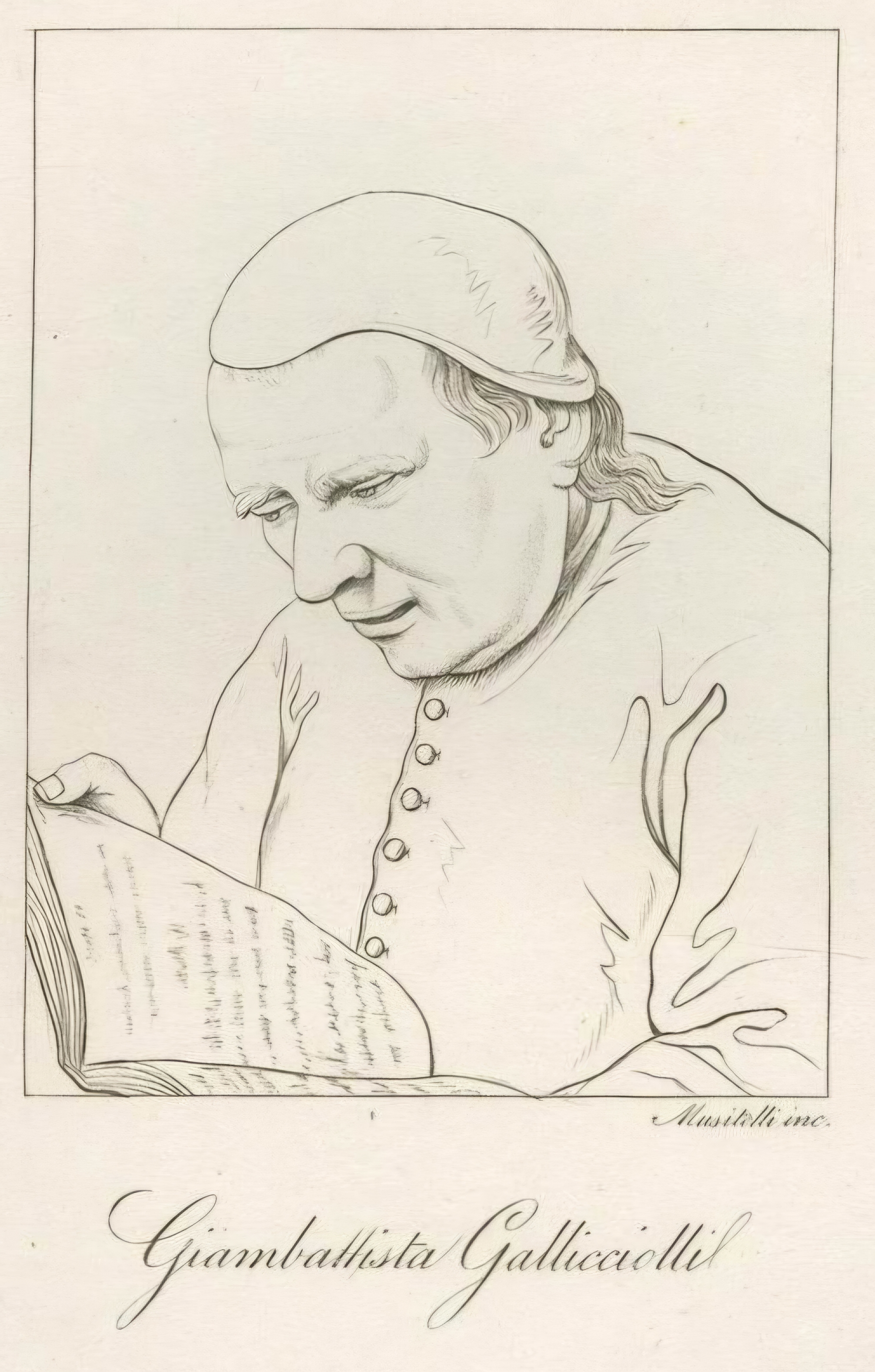
Giovanni Battista Gallizioli

Giovanni Battista Gallizioli or Gallicciolli (17 May 1733 – 12 May 1806) was an Italian philosopher, hebraist, orientalist, historian, archaeologist and philologist, catholic priest and citizen of the Republic of Venice.

== Life ==
Giovanni Battista Gallizioli was born in Venice in 1733 to Paolo and Adriana Grismondi. In 1749 he entered the catholic priesthood and began wider studies, ranging from theology to philosophy, from history to ancient literature, and the eastern languages, especially Hebrew (his master was the rabbi Simchah ben Abraham Calimani), the Syriac and the Chaldean. He also gained knowledge of English and French as well as of mathematics and geometry.

For a time he was employed as a private teacher, but in December 1782 he was called to take the Greek and Hebrew chair in Venice. According to some biographers, Gallicciolli rejected the chair of Oriental languages at the University of Parma. He also rejected the proposal of Andrea Querini who wanted him at the University of Padua. He accepted, however, to teach Greek for free to the masters of the Patriarchal Seminary of Venice.

His entire life was divided between his activities of scholar, philologist and priest in San Cassiano, his native parish.

From the very beginning, Galliccioli distinguished himself, in Venice and beyond, as an academic of Jewish language and culture. Between 1774 and 1805 he was in close contact with Giovanni Bernardo De Rossi, with whom he had correspondence on philological questions. He was also a friend of Jacopo Nani and Andrea Memmo, for whom he studied ancient inscriptions and codes.

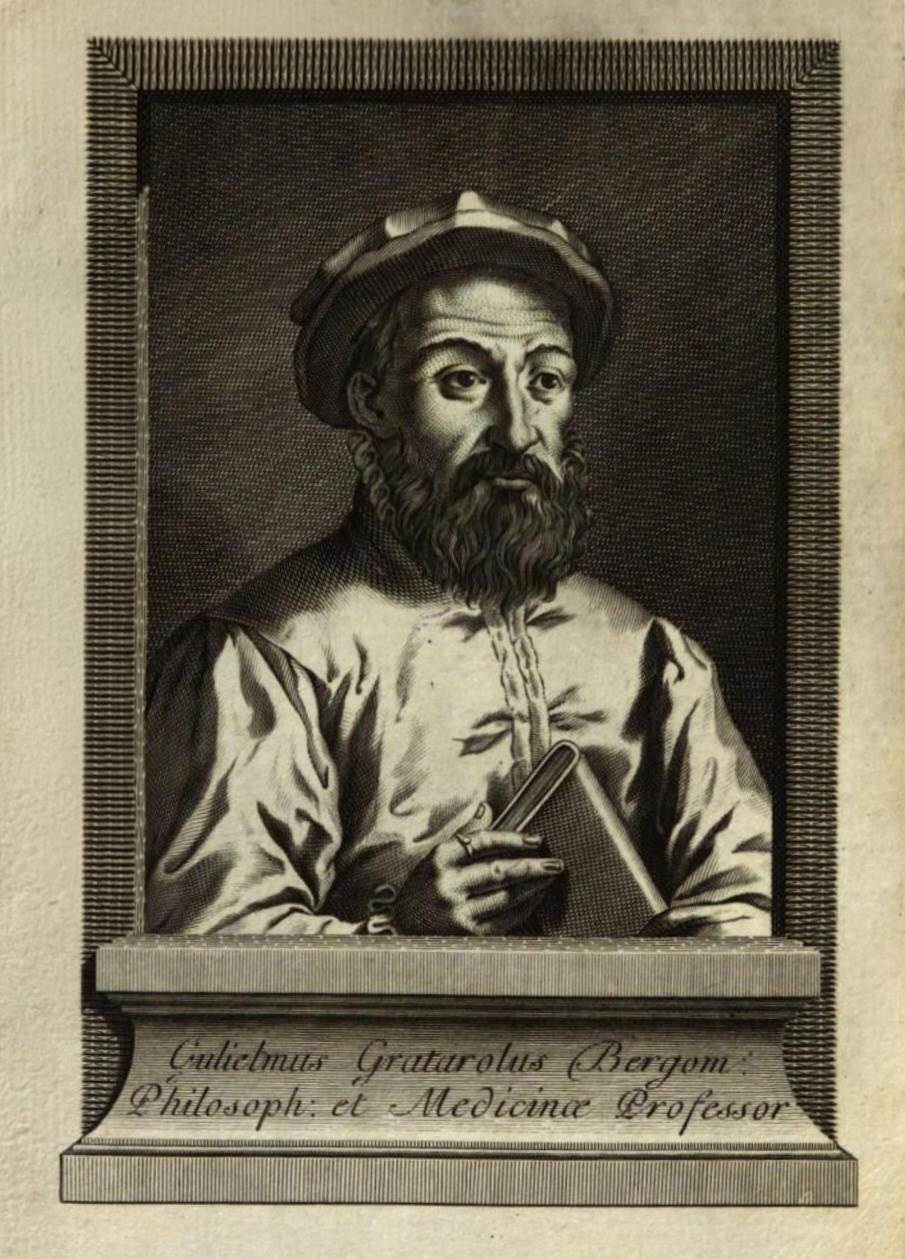
Della vita degli studi e degli scritti di Gulielmo Grataroli (1788)

The first important publication that emphasized his relevance, especially in the patristic era, was S. Gregorii papae I cognomento Magni Opera omnia, an edition of the works of Saint Gregory the Great printed between 1768 and 1776. In the introduction, the author underlined the innovations on which the work was based, focusing on the coding of the Biblioteca Marciana codes and those of the bishop of Torcello Giovanni Nani.

In 1778 he published a biography on Guglielmo Gratarolo, Della vita degli studi e degli scritti di Gulielmo Grataroli filosofo e medico.

He died in Venice in 1806.

== Works ==
- S. Gregorii papae I cognomento Magni Opera omnia, between 1768 and 1776
- Della vita degli studi e degli scritti di Gulielmo Grataroli filosofo e medico (in Italian). Bergamo: Stamperia Locatelli. 1788.
- Delle memorie Venete antiche, profane ed ecclesiastiche (in Italian). Venezia: Domenico Fracasso. 1795.
