= Richard of Wendover =

English cleric and physician

- Occupation: Physician

Richard of Wendover (died 1252) was an English cleric and physician.

== Life ==
Richard was a canon of St. Paul's, in which church he held at one time the prebend of Ealdland, probably succeeding Roger Niger in 1229. He afterwards held the prebend of Rugmere, which previously to 1250 he had exchanged for that of Neasden. Matthew Paris mentions that he was at one time physician to Gregory IX, who, on his death in 1241, gave Richard a crucifix containing relics, which Richard in his turn bequeathed to St. Albans. (Note: Matthew of Paris, Historia Anglorum v. 299.) He died in 1252, his obit at St. Paul's being observed on 5 March. (Note: Newcourt, Repertorium, i. 36, 145, 183.) He left bequests to various bodies, including the hospital of St James's, near London, to have prayers said for his soul.

== Identity ==
Richard of Wendover, the canon of St. Paul's and physician, is to be carefully distinguished from Richard de Wendene or de Wendover (died 1250), Bishop of Rochester, as well as from the famous jurist, Ricardus Anglicus, who has been himself confused with Richard Poor, Bishop of Durham; and, finally, from another Richard who was celebrated as a physician in the early part of the thirteenth century, and had been physician at Montpellier, of whom Gilles de Corbeil (fl. 1222), in his Compendium Medicinæ, says:

Qui vetulo canos profert de pectore sensus
Ricardus senior, quem plus ætate senili
Ars facit esse senem.

Translation:

Who brings grey feelings from an old chest,
Richard the elder, whom
Art made more old than his age.

Some have thought Richard of Wendover identical with a second famous physician, Richard the Englishman (Ricardus Anglicus), who had studied medicine at Paris and Salerno, and was author of the Practica sive medicamenta Ricardi, in which reference is made to the writer's practice at Bologna and Spoleto, and of the Tractatus de Urinis, whose author is sometimes styled "Ricardus Anglicus", and sometimes "Ricardus Salernitanus". Gilbert the Englishman cites a treatise De Urinis as by Master Richard, one of the most skilful of all doctors. Richard is mentioned as a celebrated physician by John of Gaddesden and others.

== Works ==
The following writings are ascribed to Richard the famous physician, although all may not be from the same pen:

1. Micrologus Magistri Ricardi Anglici, MS. Bibl. Nat. 6957. This treatise, which is not found entire in any manuscript, is a sort of brief medical encyclopædia; it is a compilation from Greek and Arabic writers, though it shows some independence of thought and originality of expression. Probably most of the following are really parts of the Micrologus, for in a preface to this work Richard speaks of its contents or "rules touching the urine", on anatomy, purging medicines, and the prognostics of diseases.
2. Anatomia, MSS. Bibl. Nat. 6988, 7056, Ashmole MS. 1398, ii. 2, in the Bodleian Library. In Merton College MS. 324, f. 150 b, there is Liber Anathomiæ partim ex Ricardo Salernitano confectus.
3. Practica, MSS. Bibl. Nat. 6957, 7056: inc. Acutarum est alia terciana, and Balliol College, 285, ff. 47–63, where it is styled Micrologus. Both the Anatomia and Practica are in fact parts of the Micrologus.
4. De Signis prognosticis. Inc. Finis Medicinæ dumtaxat, under this title in MSS. S. Germain des Prés, 1306, 6954 in the Bibliothèque Nationale, Univ. Libr. Cambridge, MS. Ee. ii. 20, f. 40 b, and Ii i. 17, f. 158. In Gonville and Caius College MS. 117 as Signa Ricardi, in Exeter College 35 f. 108 as Signa Medicinalia, and in MS. Bibl. Nat. 7056 as Summa de signis dierum criticorum. M. Littré thinks the treatises De Crisi and De Pulsibus are parts of this work. This theory is in part confirmed by St. Peter's College, Cambridge, MS. 218, which gives under one head Summa Ricardi de criticis diebus et pulsibus, et de modo conficiendi et medendi, but in the same manuscript De Crisi, Phlebotomia appear separately. The part De Pulsibus is contained in New College MS. 167, f. 2. Another fragment of the same treatise has been printed under the title De signis febrium in the Opus aureum ac præclarum, Venice, 1514, fol.; Lyons, 1517, 4to; Basle, 1535, fol.
5. De modo conficiendi et medendi, MS. Univ. Libr. Cambr. Ee. ii. 20, ff. 13–17, and Gonville and Caius College MS. It is clear from St. Peter's Coll. MS. 218 that this is part of the same treatise as No. 4. M. Littré thinks it is perhaps identical with the Practica, No. 2. Very probably the identification should also extend to the Compendium Medicinæ of Bodleian MS. 2462, f. 516, and the Summa Ricardi of other manuscripts. All of them are probably more or less considerable fragments of the Micrologus.
6. De Phlebotomia,’ inc. ‘Medelam membrorum duplicem, MS. Bibl. Nat. 6988, MS. Cambrai 815, St. Peter's Coll. MS. 218.
7. De Urinis, inc. in some copies Circa urinas quinque sunt pensanda, in others Quinque attenduntur generalia. All copies seem to have prefixed a distich of which the first line is: "Qui cupit urinas mea per compendia scire". New Coll. MS. 167, f. 6; Exeter Coll. 35, All Souls' Coll. 80; Merton Coll. 324 (as Ricardi Salernitani); Gonville and Caius Coll. MS. 95, MS. Cambrai, 815. In MS. Bibl. Nat. 7030 there is a tract De Urinis attributed to Richard which begins "Quum secundum Avicennam viginti sint colores urine", which, however, is no doubt by Walter Agilon. In Cambr. Univ. Libr. MS. Ii. i. 17, there is a third tract beginning Præsentium Corporis.
8. Repressiva, MS. Univ. Libr. Cambr. Ee. ii. 20, f. 24, inc. Laxativa solent, Gonville and Caius Coll. MS. 95. This is no doubt the part of the Micrologus which treats of purging medicines, as indicated by Richard in his prologue to that work. (Note: Histoire littéraire de la France xxi. 383.) In Balliol Coll. MS. 285, f. 226, there is Liber Ricardi de Laxativis, inc. Dupplici causa me cogente.
9. Tabulæ cum commentario Joannis de Sancto Paulo, MS. St. Peter's Coll. 218.
10. Liber Ricardi, MS. Gonville and Caius. (Note: Bernard, Catalogus MSS. Angliæ I. iii. 120.) In verse, inc. Adsit principio sancta Maria meo; a few lines are printed by M. Littré. It is likely enough by Richard, who shows a taste for versifying in his other works. But at the end the author is called Ricardinus; this suggests that the author was Richard of Bloxham, author of the Knowyng of Medicynes after Richardyne in Ashmole MS. 1498.
11. Practica sive Medicamenti Ricardi, MS. Bibl. de l'Arsenal 73, inc. Caritatis studio et brevitatis causa. In Cambr. Univ. Libr. MSS. Ee. ii. 20 and Ii i. 17, there is a Practica Ricardi beginning "Habemus ab antiquis". St. Peter's College, Cambridge, MS. 218, contains, under the name of "Ricardus Anglicus", besides Nos. 9, 6, 5, 4, and the treatise De Crisi already named, the following three:
12. Quæstiones Coll. Salernitani de Coloribus.
13. Consilia Medica.
14. De Naturali Philosophia.
15. In MS. Magd. Coll. Oxon. 145, f. 46 b there is De Ornatu libellus secundum magistrum Ricardum, which may also be by Richard the physician.

== Bibliography ==
- Getz, Faye (2004). "Wendover, Richard of (d. 1252)". In Oxford Dictionary of National Biography. Oxford: Oxford University Press. n.p.
- Kingsford, Charles Lethbridge (1896). "Richard of Wendover" . In Lee, Sidney (ed.). Dictionary of National Biography. Vol. 48. London: Smith, Elder & Co. pp. 201–202.
