= Splendor Solis =

16th-century alchemical manuscript

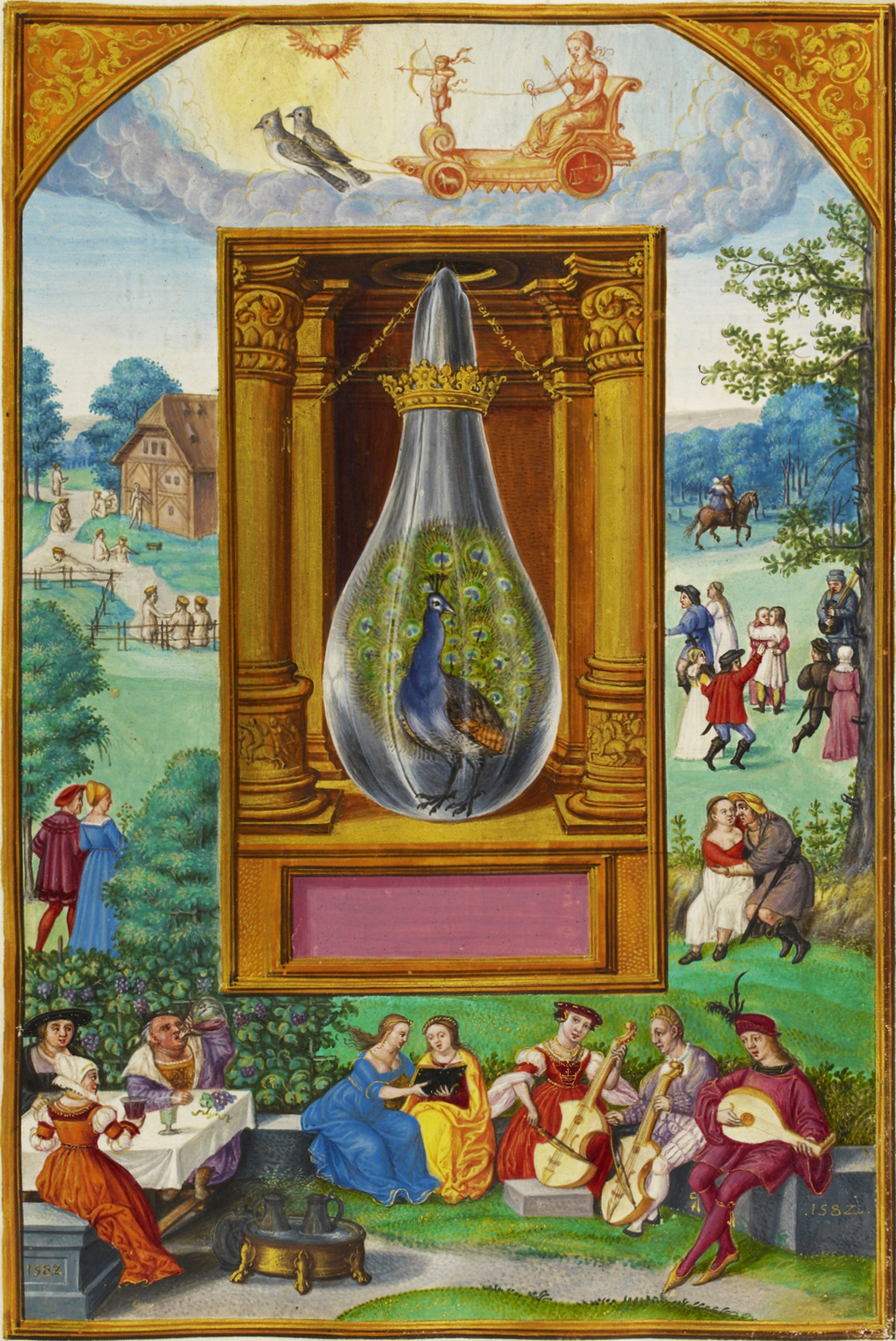
The peacock in a crowned flask associated with Venus

Splendor Solis (English: "The Splendour of the Sun") is a version of the illuminated alchemical text attributed to Salomon Trismosin.

The earliest version, written in Central German, is dated 1532–1535 and is part of the Kupferstichkabinett Berlin collection at the State Museums in Berlin. It is illuminated on vellum, with decorative borders like a book of hours, meticulously painted and highlighted with gold. The later copies in London, Kassel, Paris and Nuremberg are equally fine. Twenty versions exist worldwide.

The original of Splendor Solis, which contained seven chapters, appeared in Augsburg. In miniatures the works of Albrecht Dürer, Hans Holbein and Lucas Cranach were used. The author of the manuscript was considered to be the legendary Salomon Trismosin, allegedly the teacher of Paracelsus, though the name is believed to be a pseudonym. The work consists of a sequence of 22 elaborate images, set in ornamental borders and niches. The symbolic process shows the classical alchemical death and rebirth of the king, and incorporates a series of seven flasks, each associated with one of the then-known planets. Within the flasks a process is shown involving the transformation of bird and animal symbols into the Queen and King, the white and the red tincture. Although the style of the Splendor Solis illuminations suggest an earlier date, they are likely of the 16th century.

== Gallery ==
These images are from the version preserved at the British Library, dated around 1582.

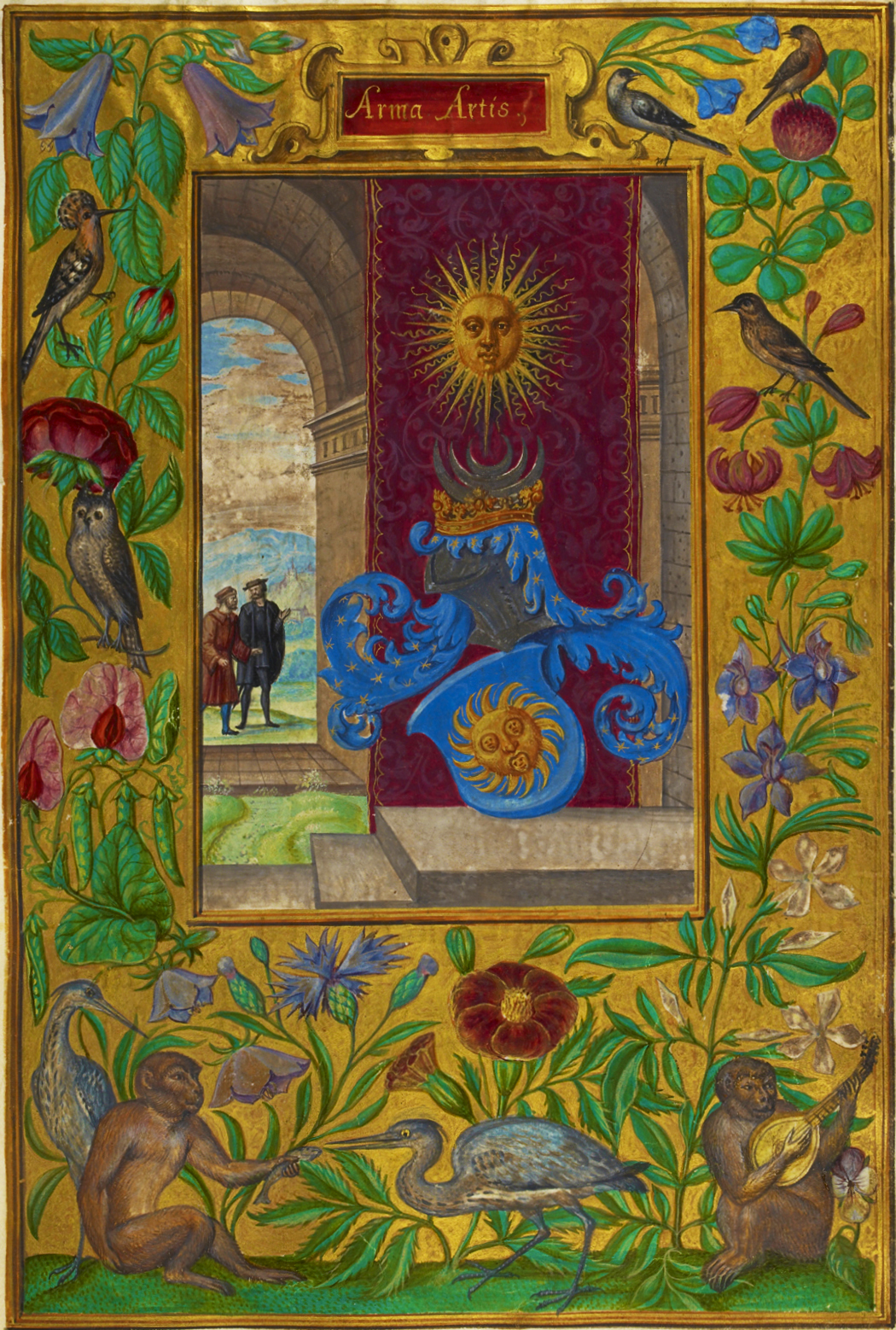
Weapons of the Art: Two golden suns with man-like faces, one displayed on a shield.

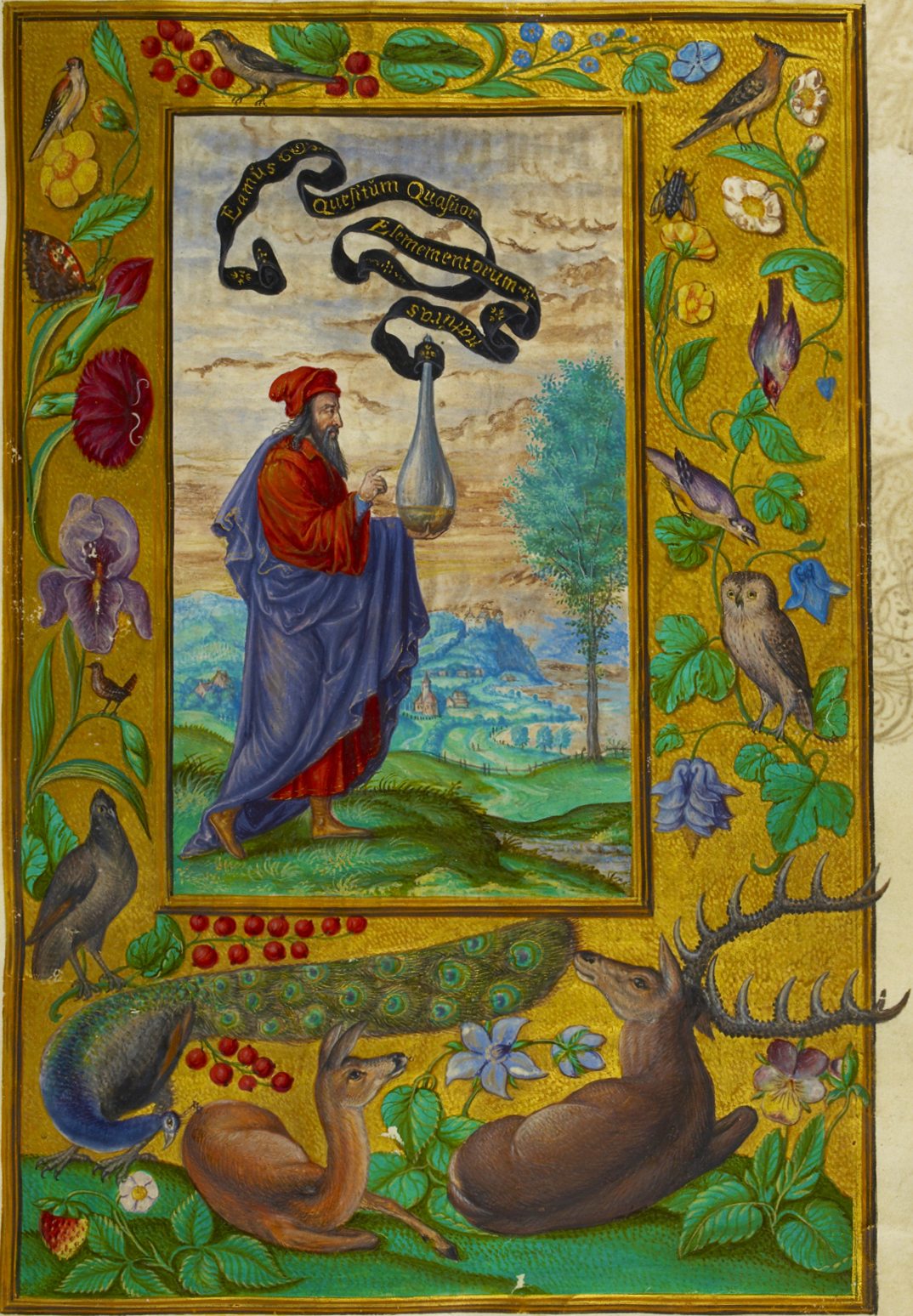
First Treatise: a philosopher holding an alchemical flask from the top of which ascends a black scroll, standing in a natural landscape. The scroll reads "Let us seek the natures of the four elements".

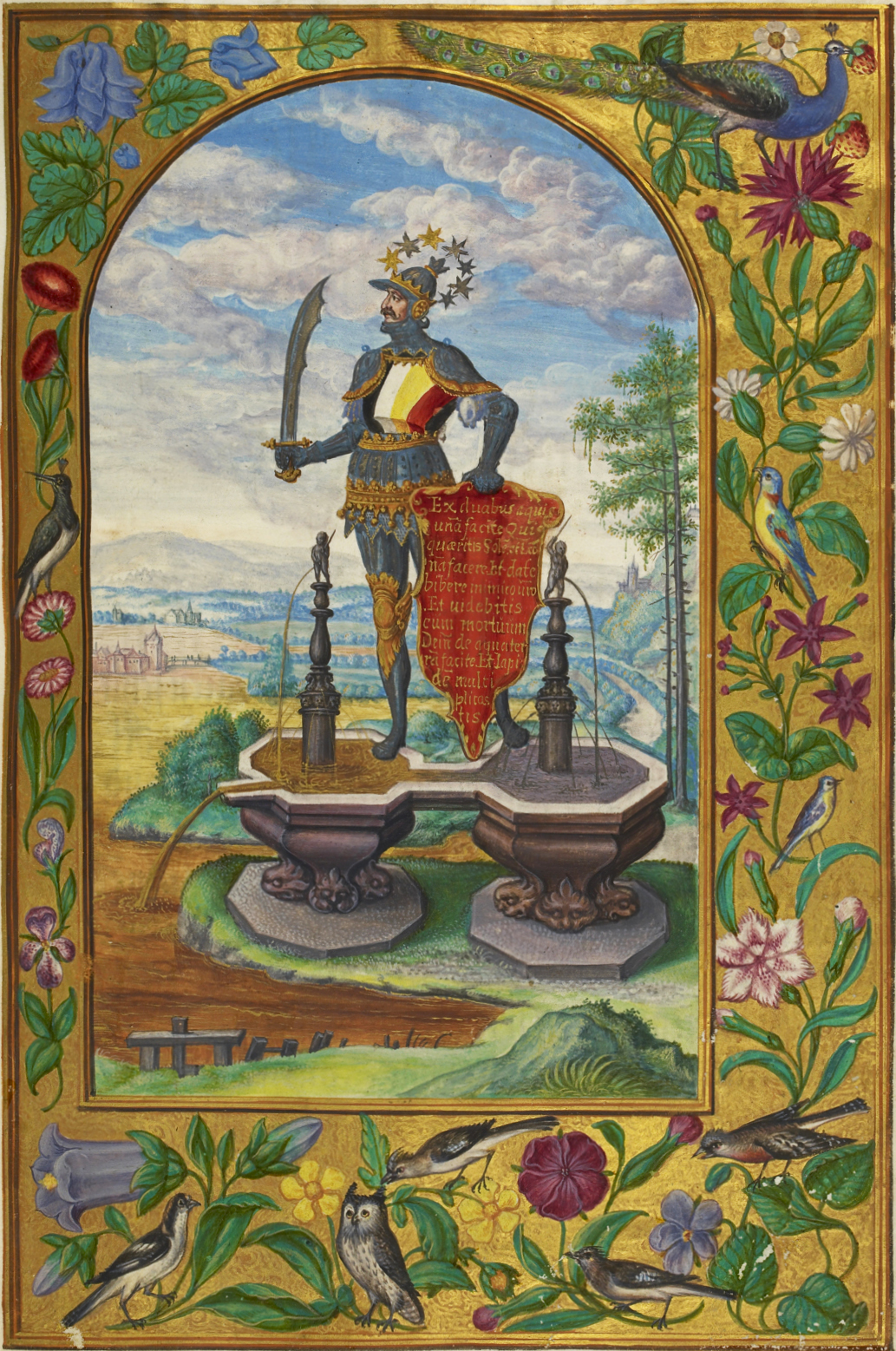
Second Treatise: knight with sword is crowned by gold and silver stars atop two fountains. His shield reads: "From two waters make one, you who seek to make the Sun and the Moon. And give it to drink to the unworthy. And where you must, with the dead. Then from the water remake [it] again, and you will have multiplied the Stone."

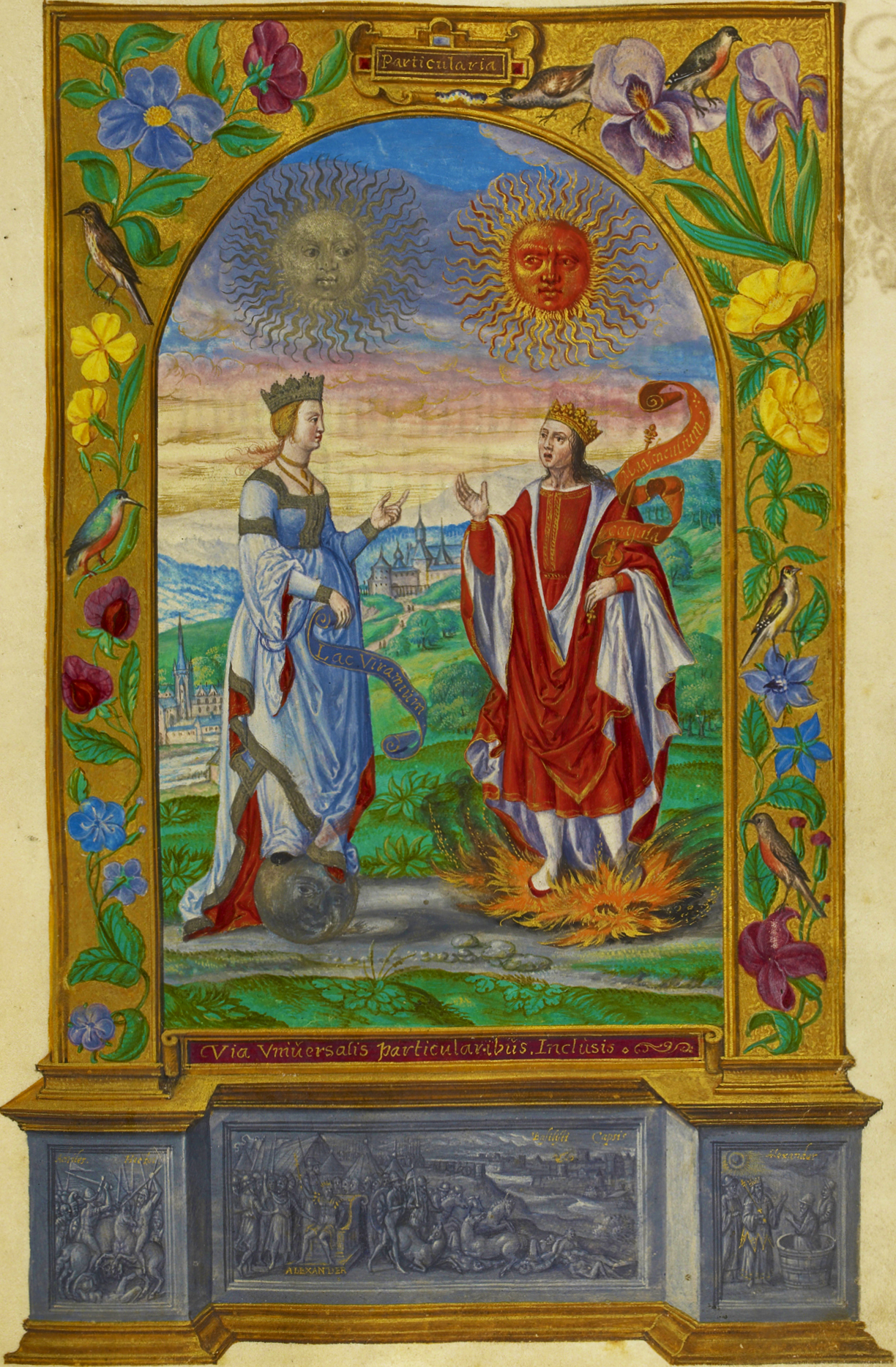
"Particulars": king and queen hold scrolls; king stands surrounded by flames, queen atop full moon. King below a red sun, queen beneath a silver sun. Captioned "The universal way with the particulars. Enclosed"

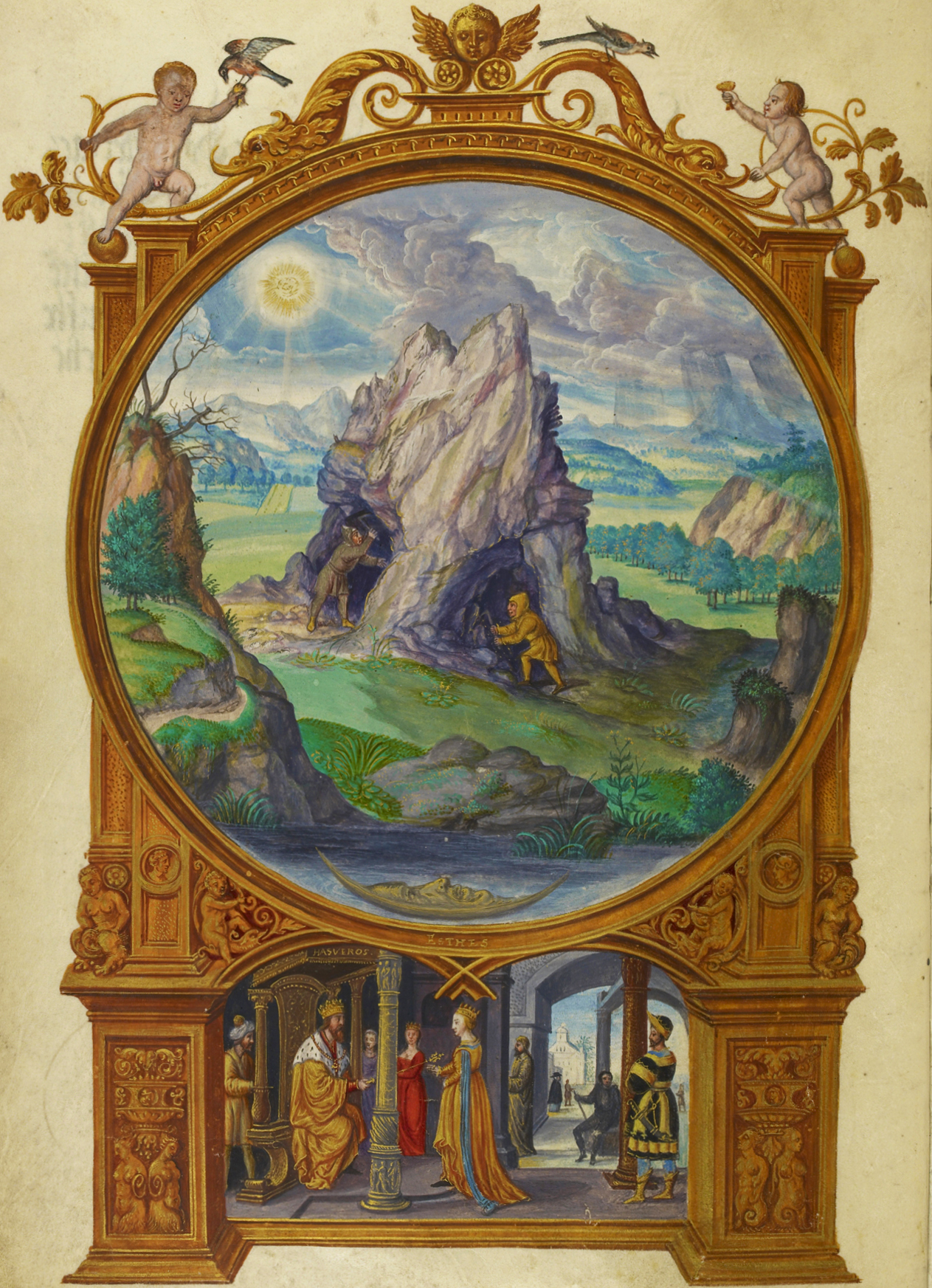
First Parable: alchemists quarry into a rock in nature.

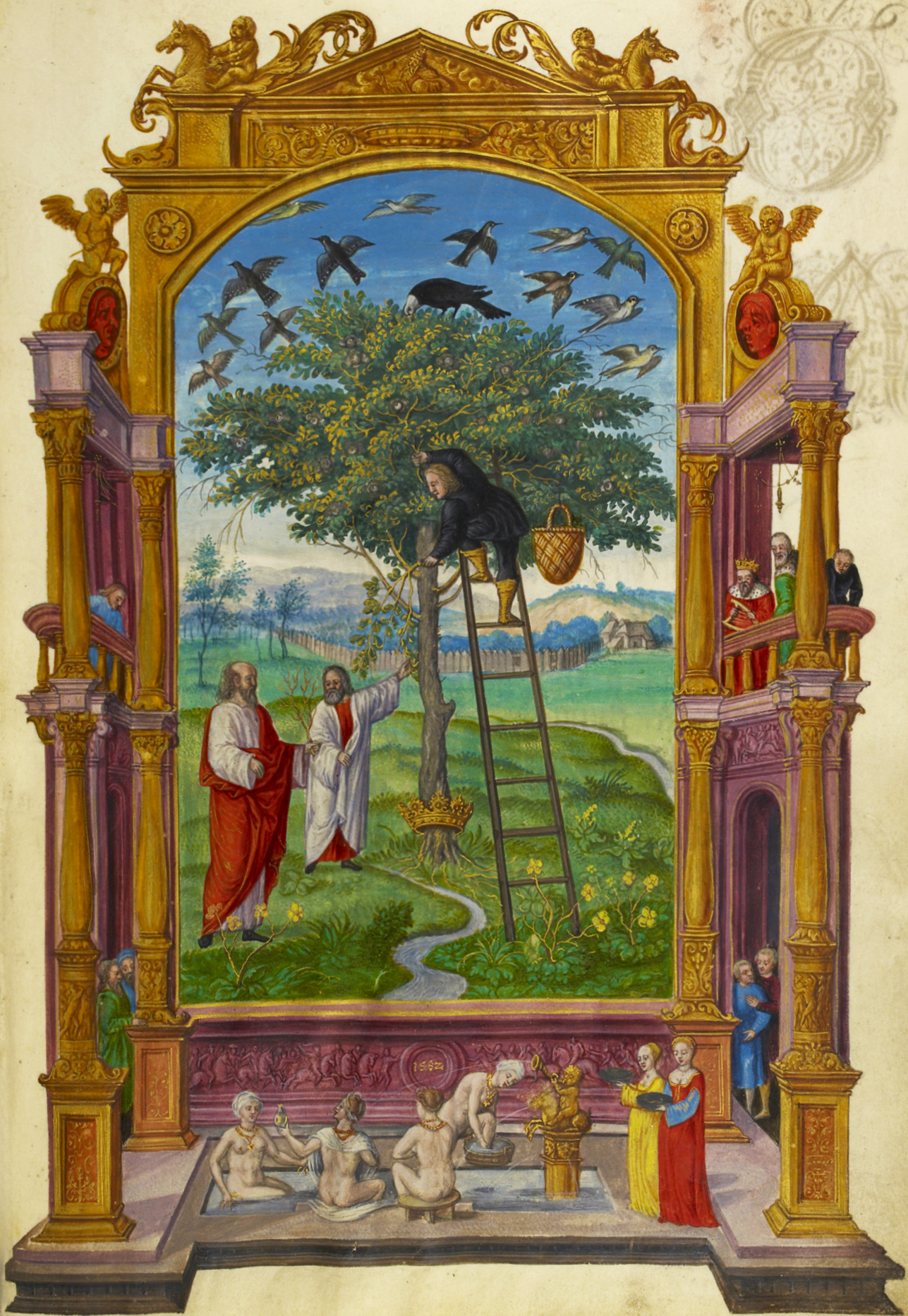
Other Parable: man ascends ladder propped against a gold tree, around whose root a crown is entwined.

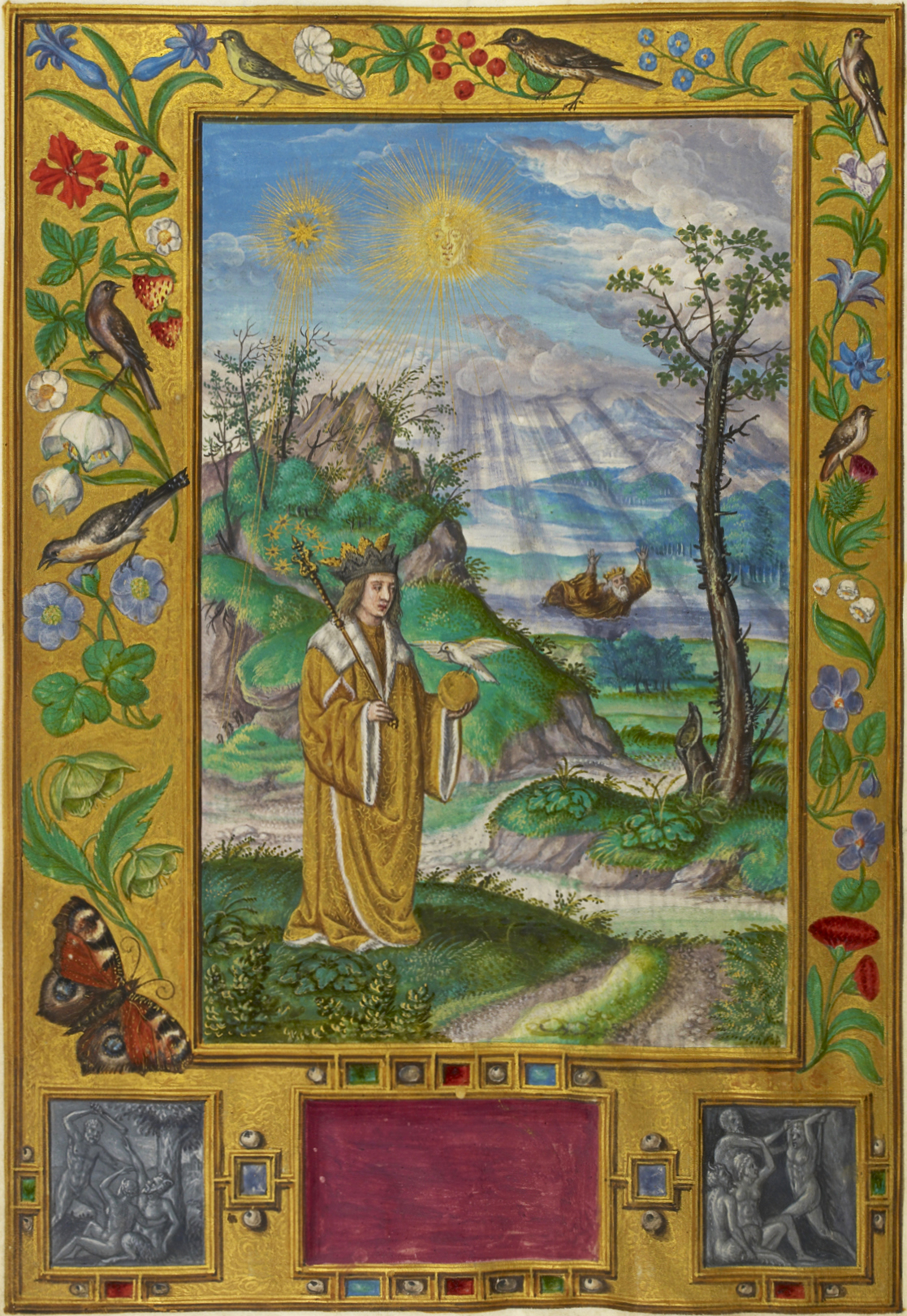
Third Parable: androgynous regal figure holds a sceptre and a golden orb, while in the background, an old king is drowning in a river.

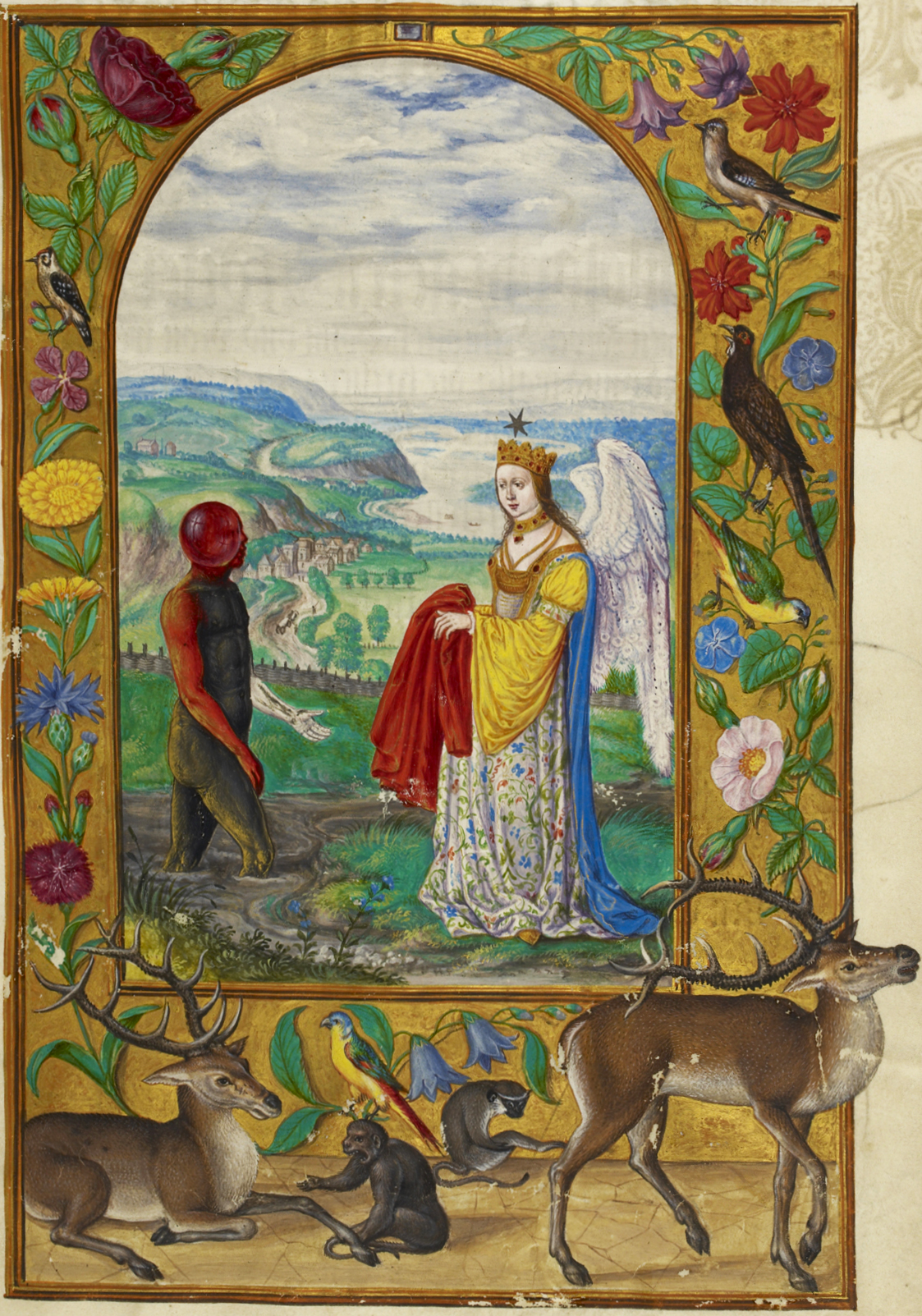
Fourth Parable: queen offers a robe to a man with a jet black body except for his bright red head and right arm, as well as his white left arm. The man is rising from a dirty pond, his head partially enclosed by a glass globe.

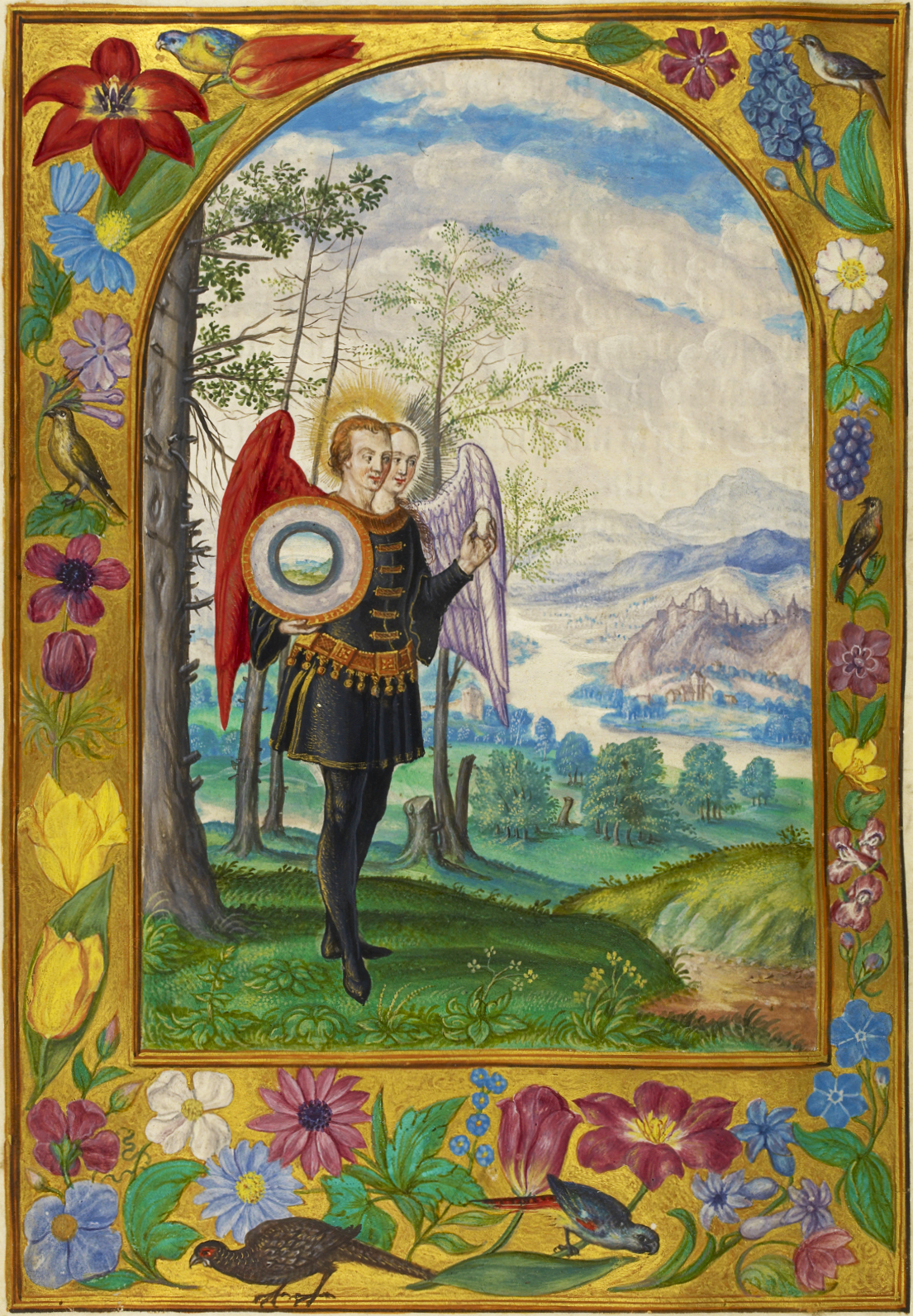
Fifth Parable: winged figure with two heads, one male, one female, grasps an egg and a highly reflective shield. The male head radiates gold, the female head silver.

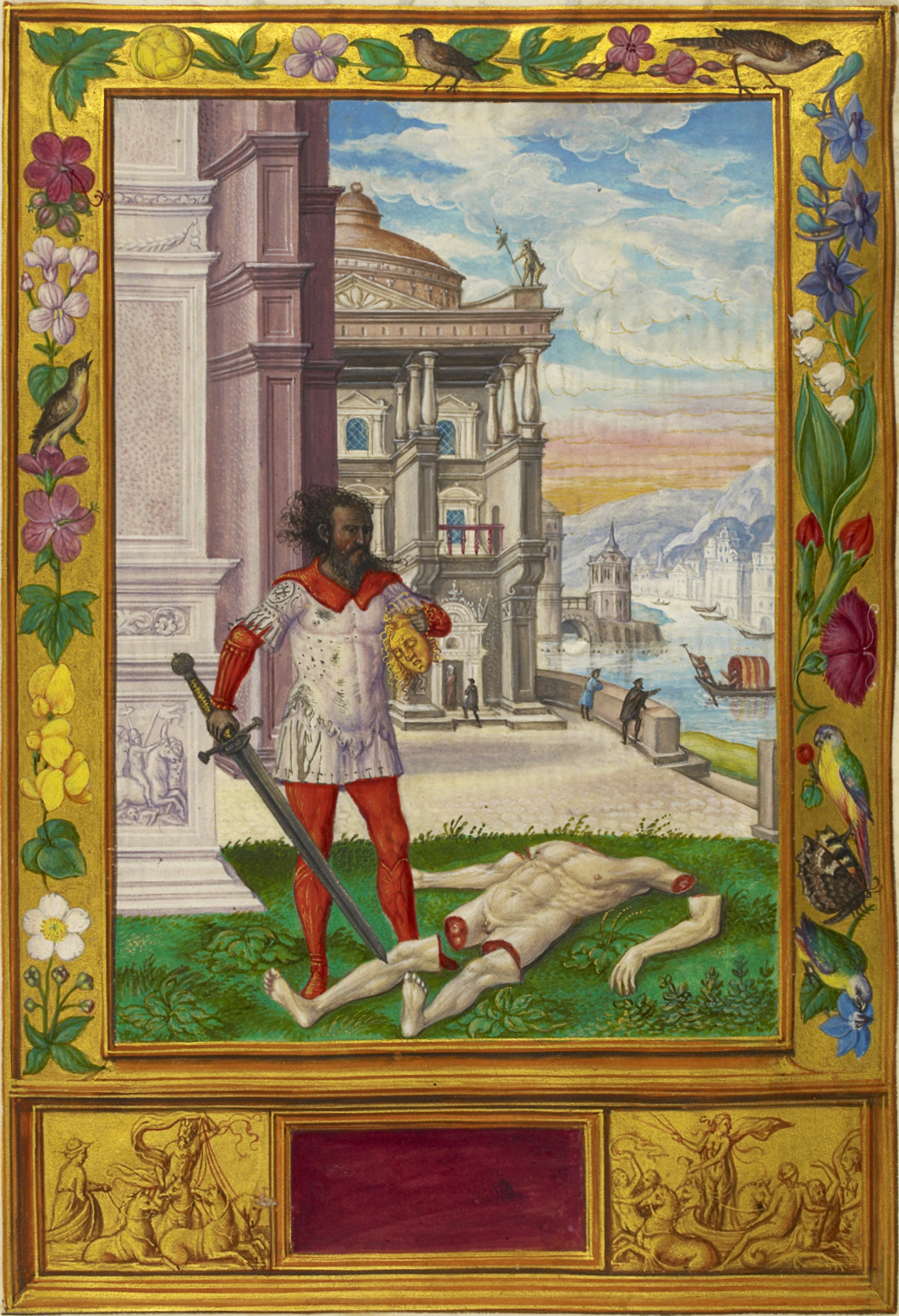
Sixth Parable: a tousled man holds a golden head, while the discombobulated body lies at his feet.

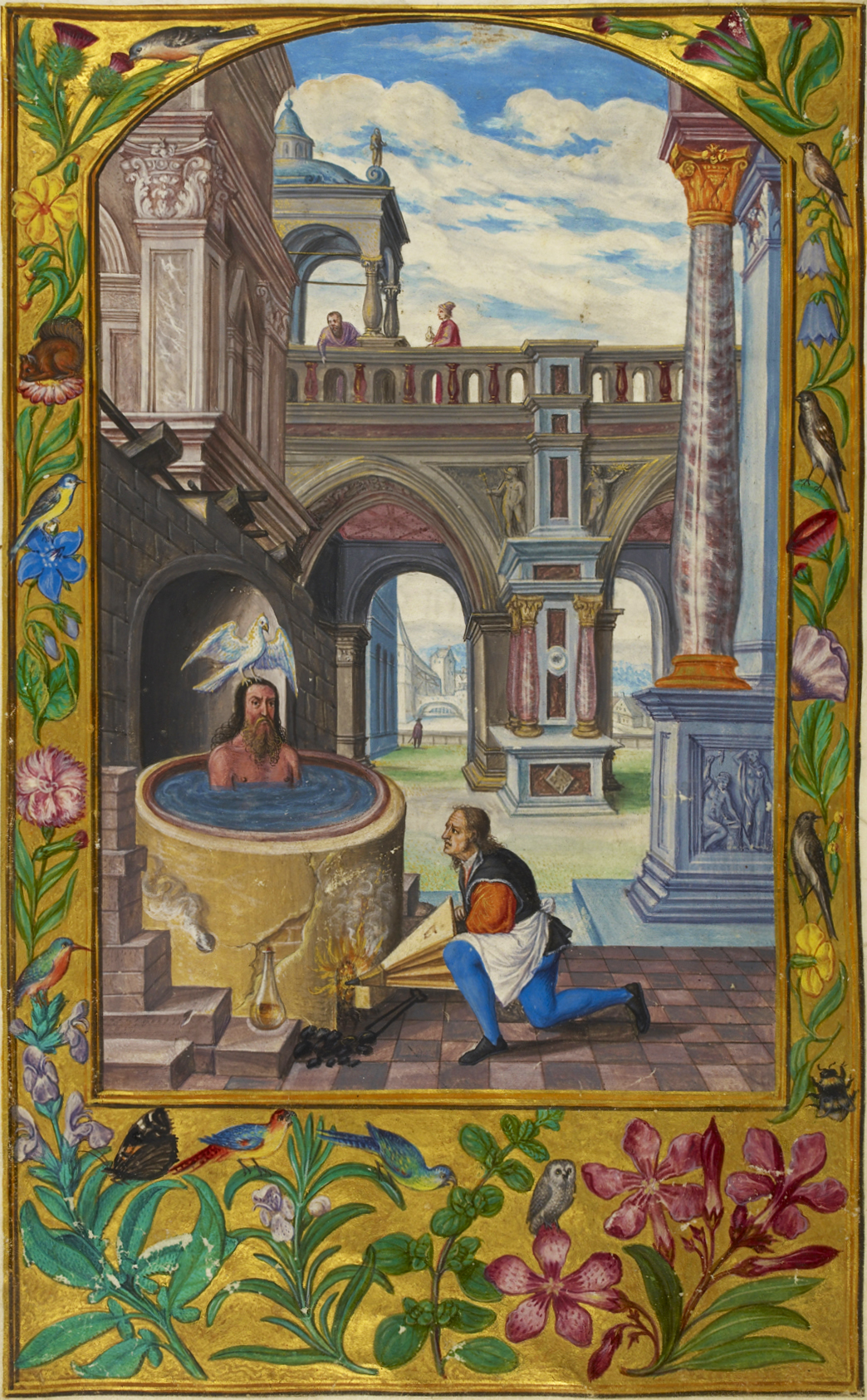
Seventh Parable: man with beard sits in a bath in a courtyard, while a manservant tends the fire beneath.

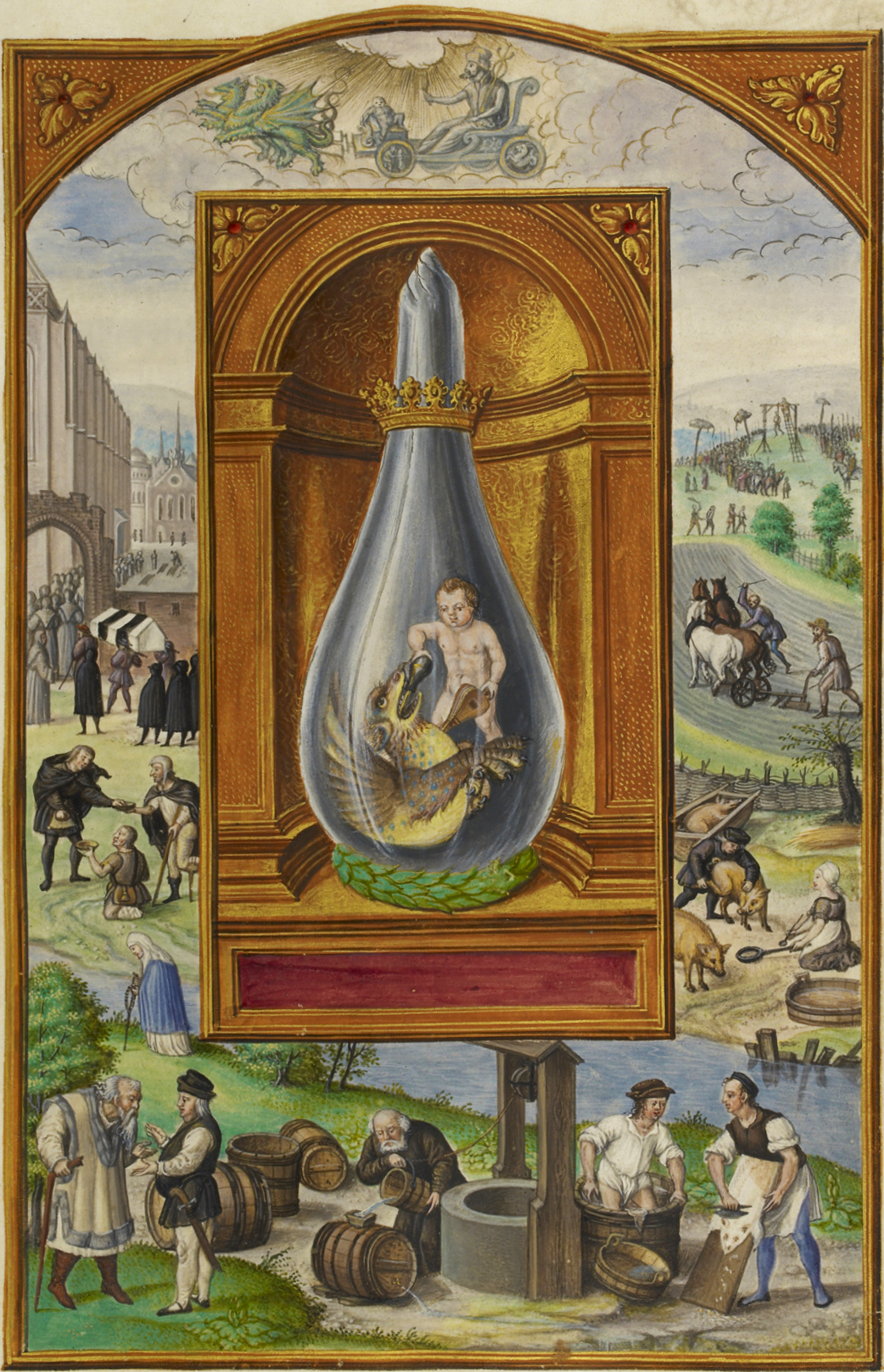
Fourth Treatise: small naked man within a glass vessel pours liquid down the throat of a dragon. Scene below a heavenly silver chariot driven by a man holding a caduceus and drawn by dragons bearing the signs for Capricorn and Aquarius on its wheels. The zodiacal signs and the activities shown in the background indicate the driver is Saturn, but the caduceus is associated with Mercury.

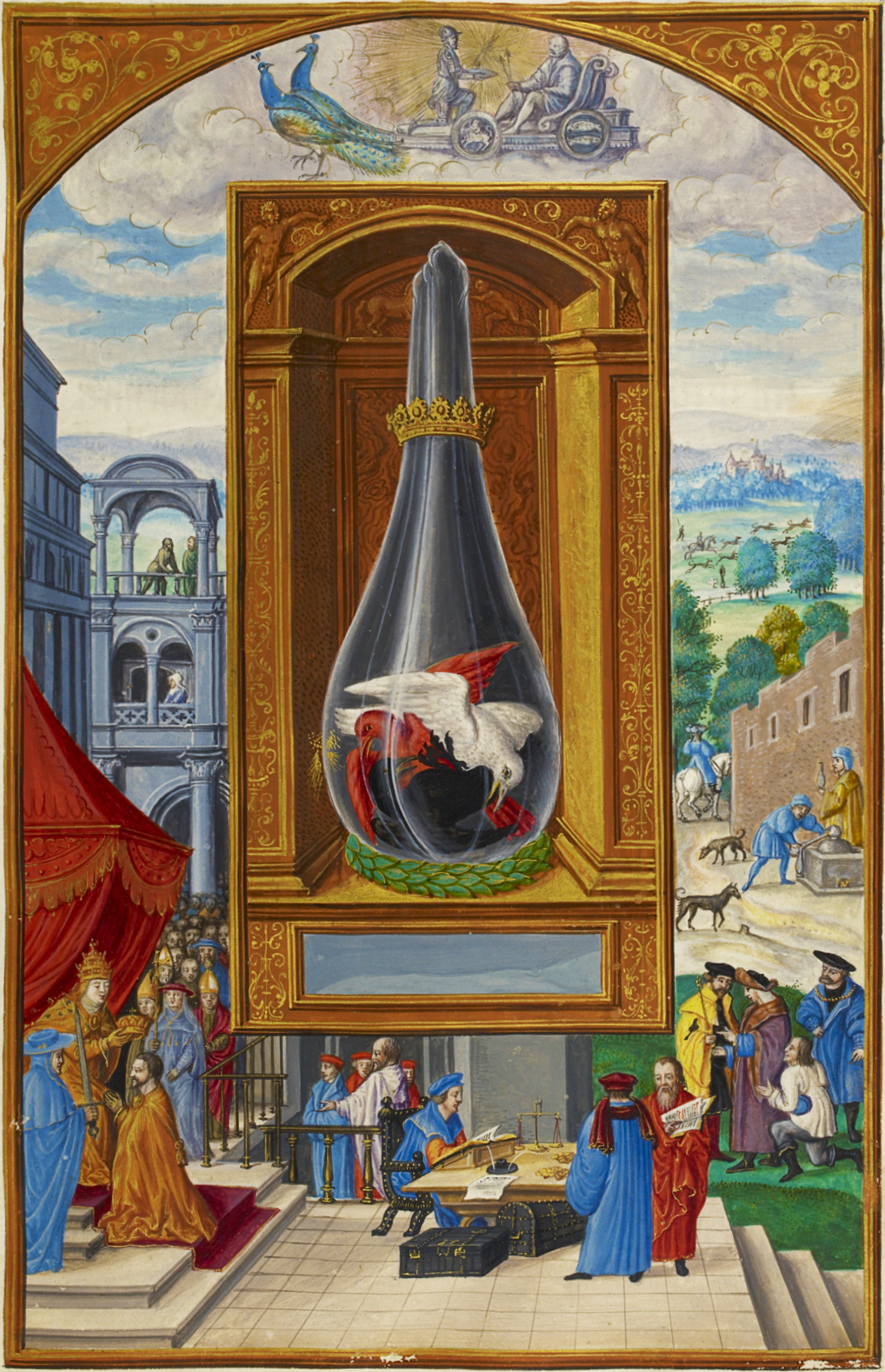
Fourth Treatise: three birds engage in ground combat in glass vessel. Scene occurs below a silver heavenly chariot drawn by peacocks and driven by a man (Jupiter) showing the signs for Sagittarius and Pisces on its wheels. Jupiter is normally associated with eagles, and his wife, Juno, with peacocks.

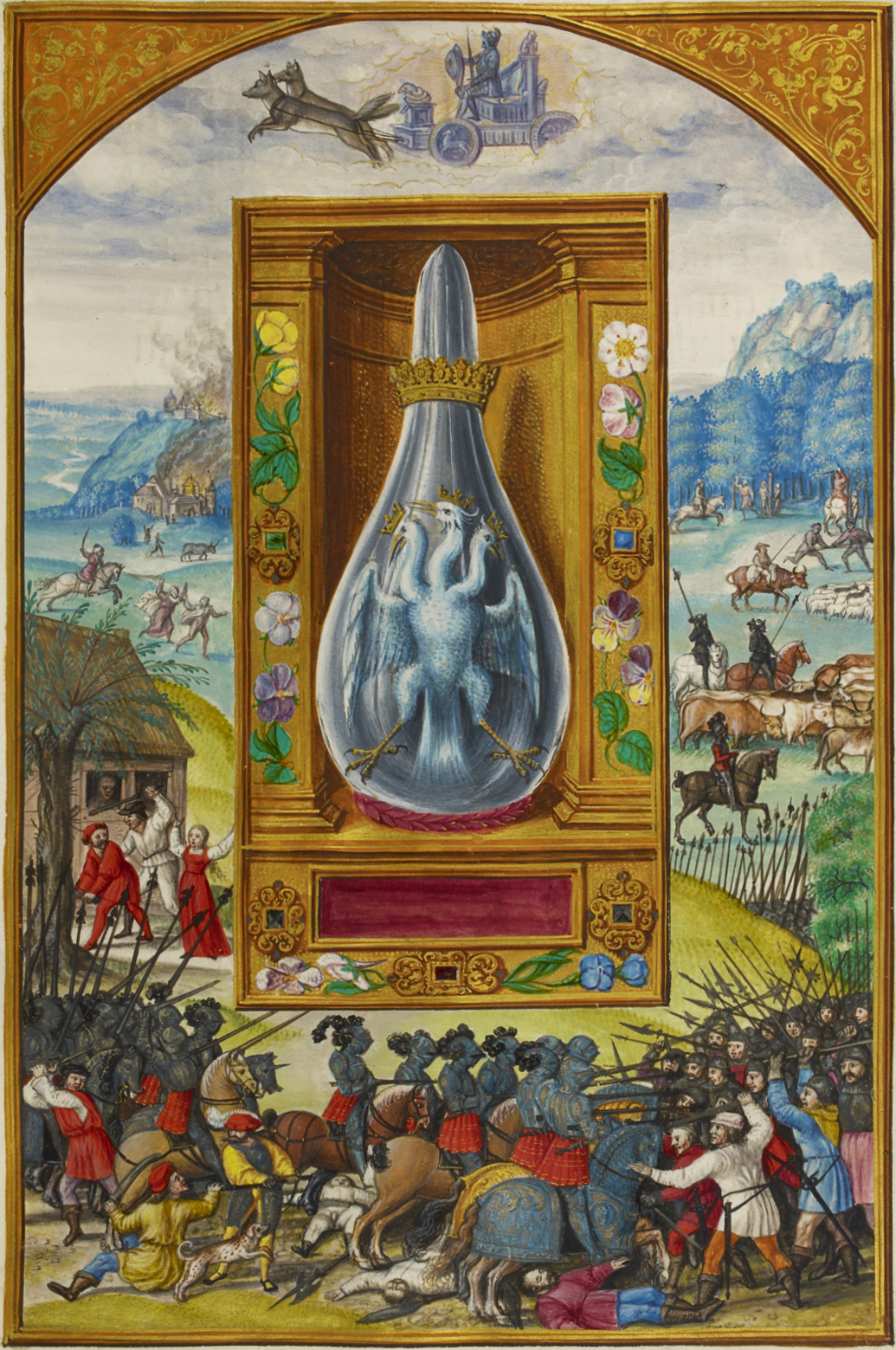
Fourth Treatise: white bird with three crowned heads in glass vessel. Scene below a silver heavenly chariot drawn by wolves (or foxes?), driven by a knight (Mars) bearing the signs for Aries and Scorpio on its wheels.

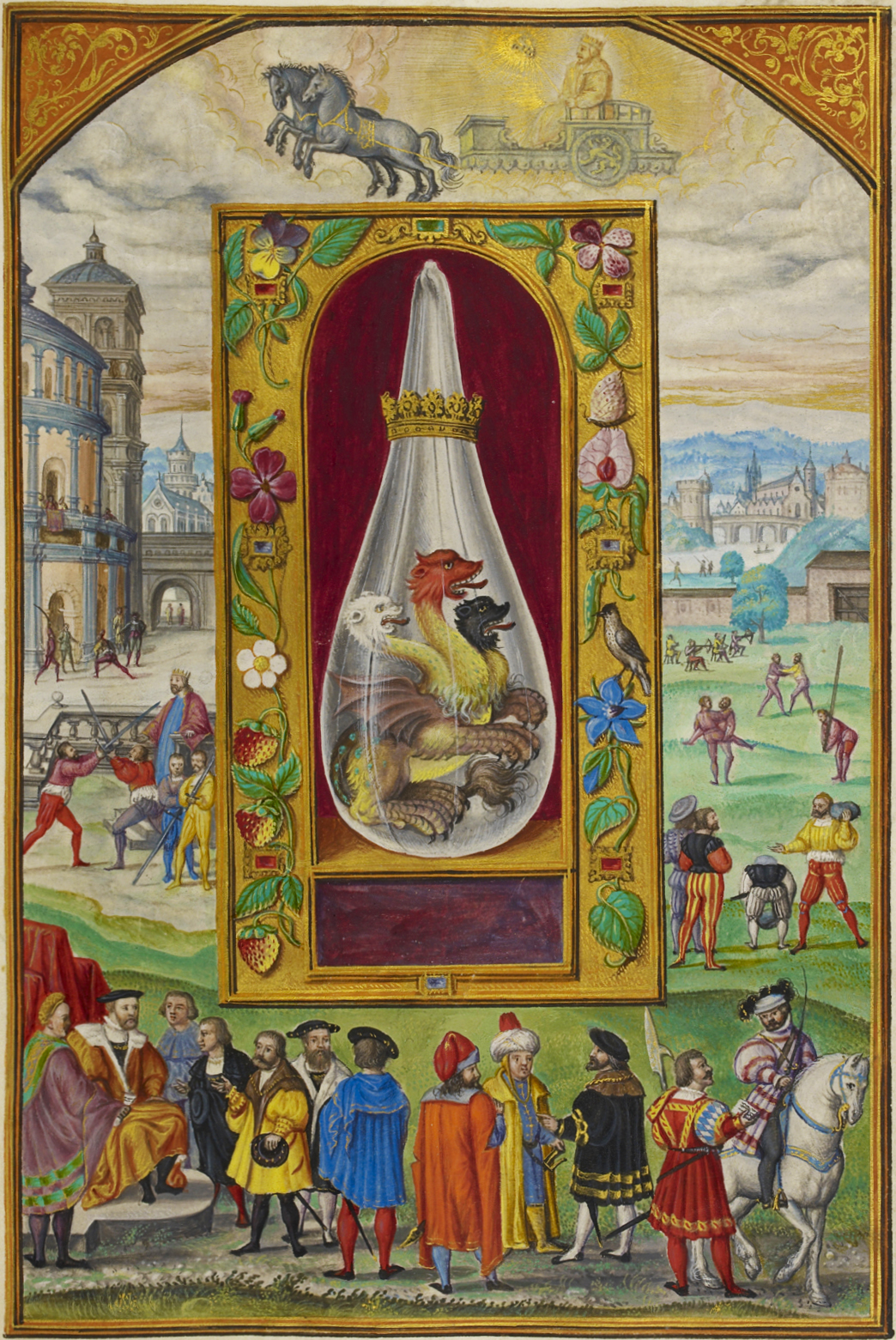
Fourth Treatise: dragon with three heads — one white, one black, one red — in glass vessel. Scene below a silver heavenly chariot turning gold, driven by a king (the Sun) bearing the sign for Leo on its wheel.

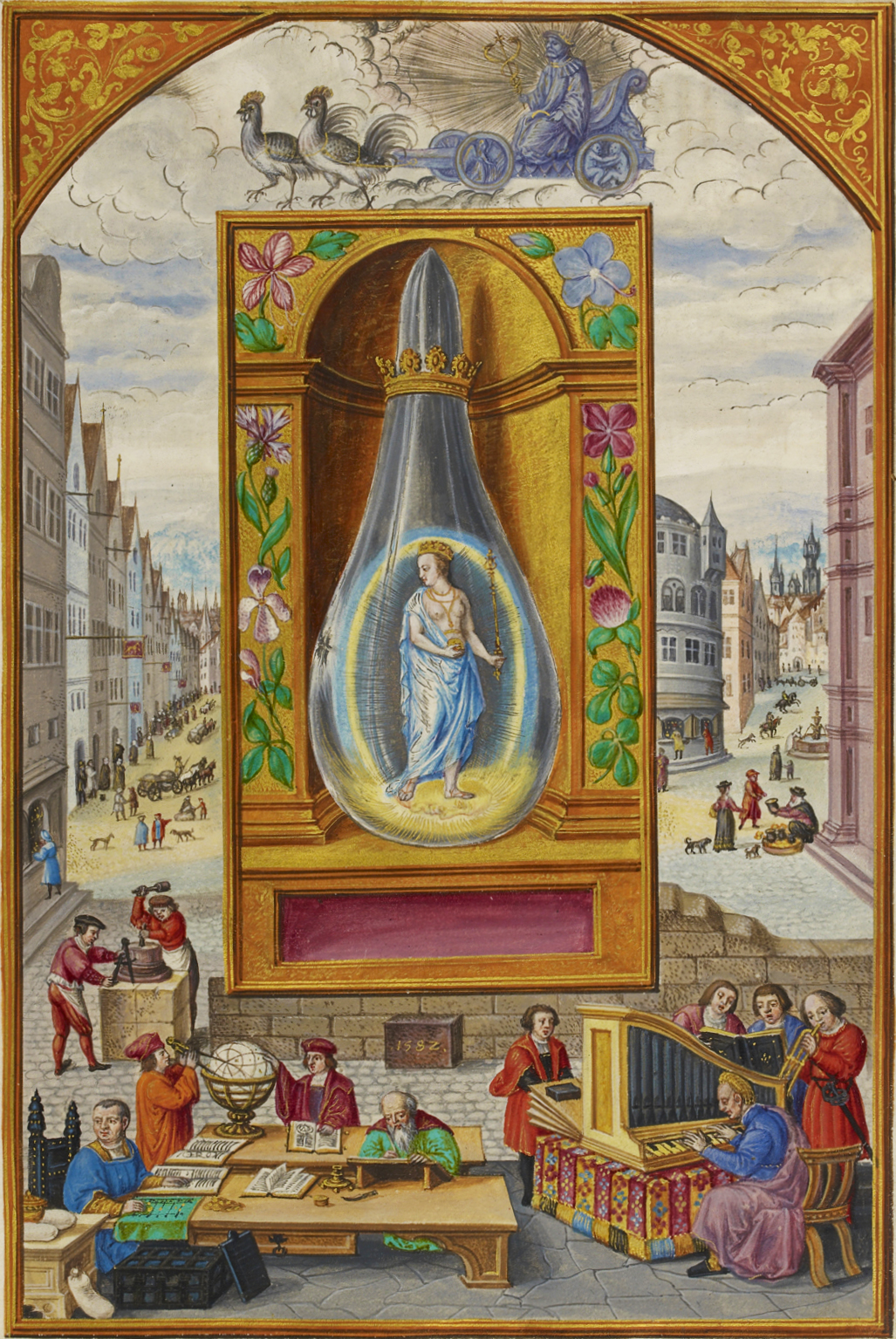
Fourth Treatise: queen in glass vessel. Scene below a silver heavenly cart driven by a man holding a caduceus (Mercury), with the signs for Virgo and Gemini on its wheels.

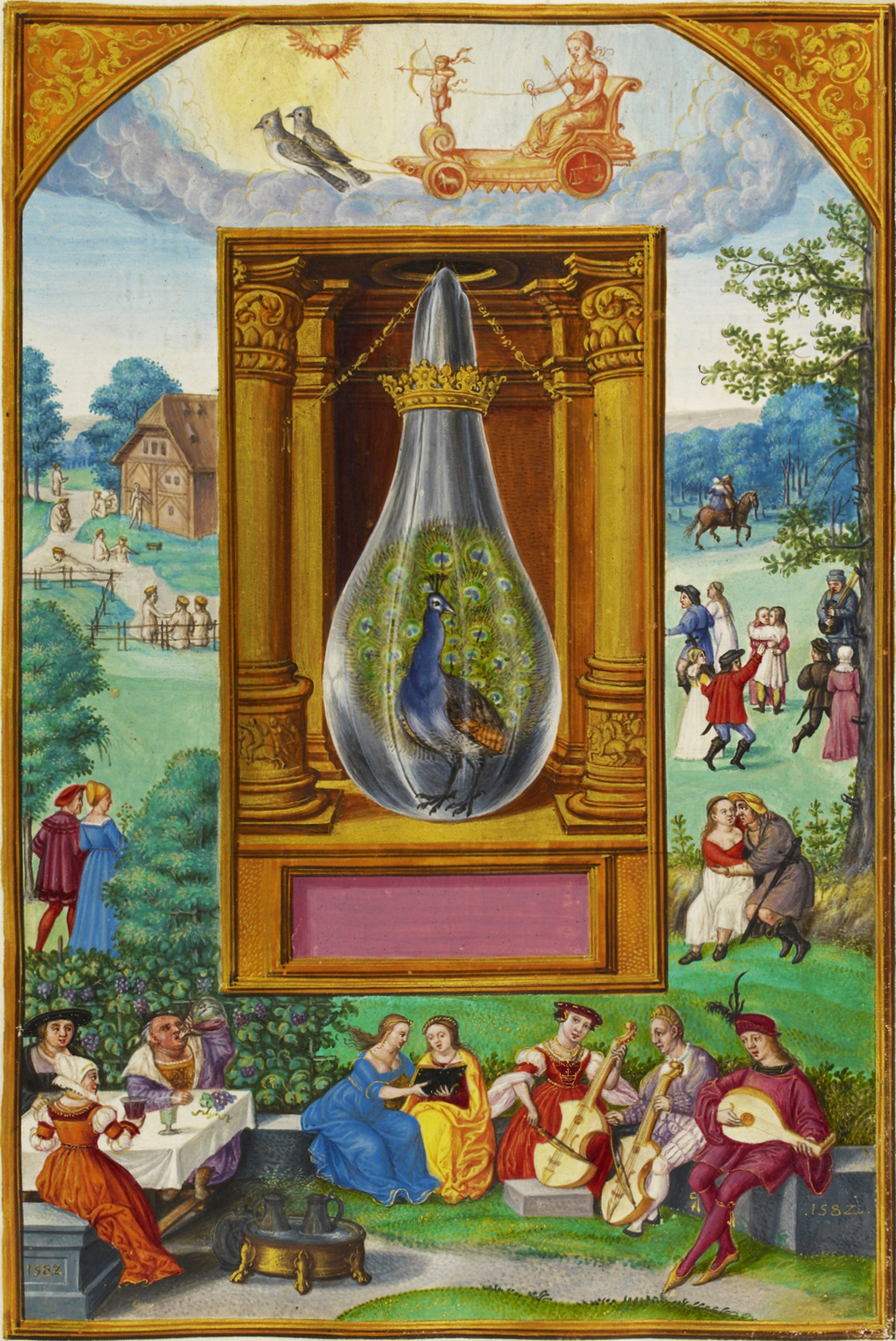
Fourth Treatise: peacock in a crowned alchemical flask, symbolizing the 'stage of the peacock's tail'—an alchemical sign preceding the attainment of the white elixir. The scene occurs below a golden heavenly chariot driven a woman (Venus) and drawn by doves bearing the image of Libra on one wheel and Taurus on the other.

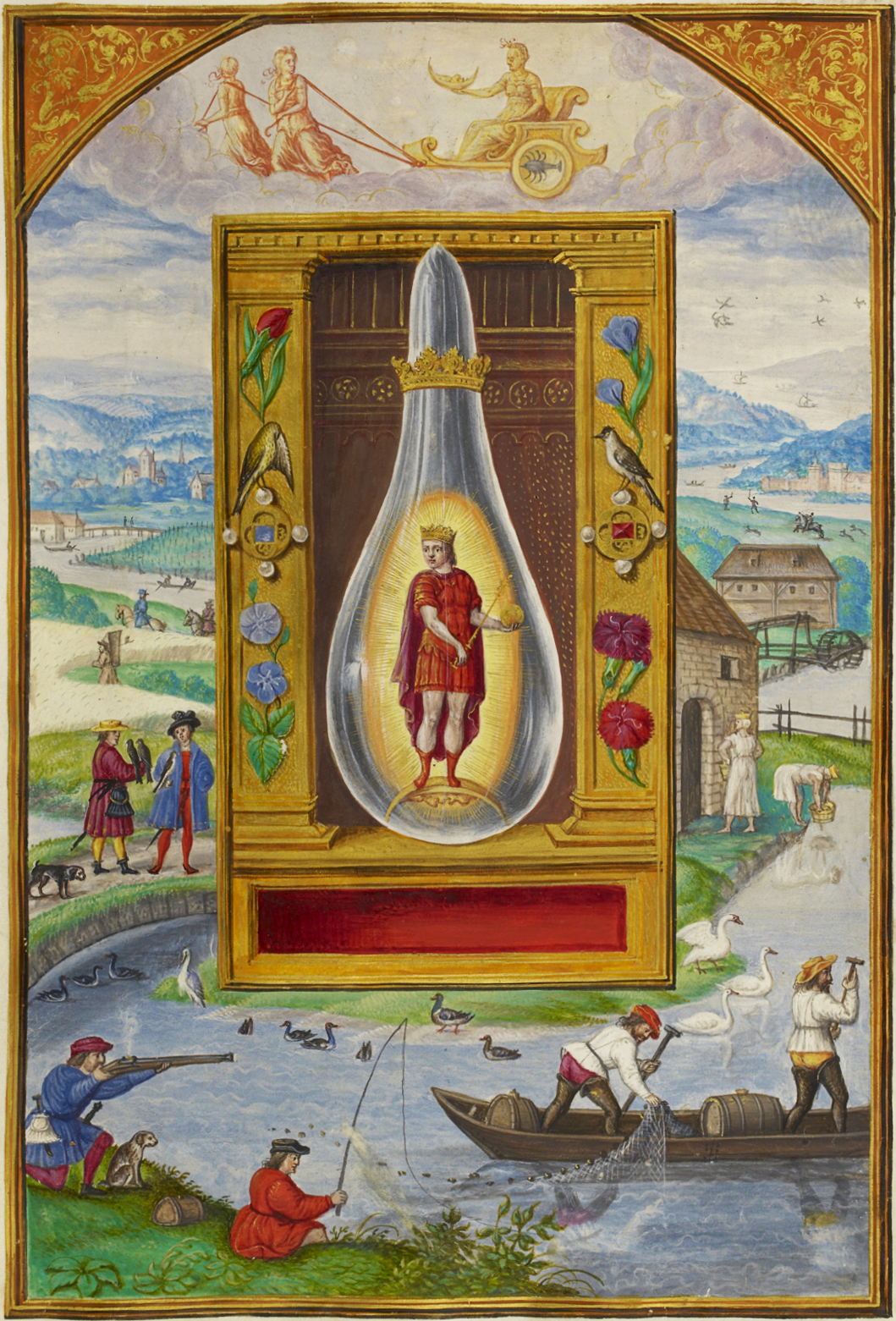
Fourth Treatise: young king, holding golden orb and sceptre, stands upon a crescent moon within a glass vessel. He stands beneath a golden heavenly chariot drawn by maidens driven by a woman (the Moon) and bearing the sign for Cancer (a crayfish) on its wheel.

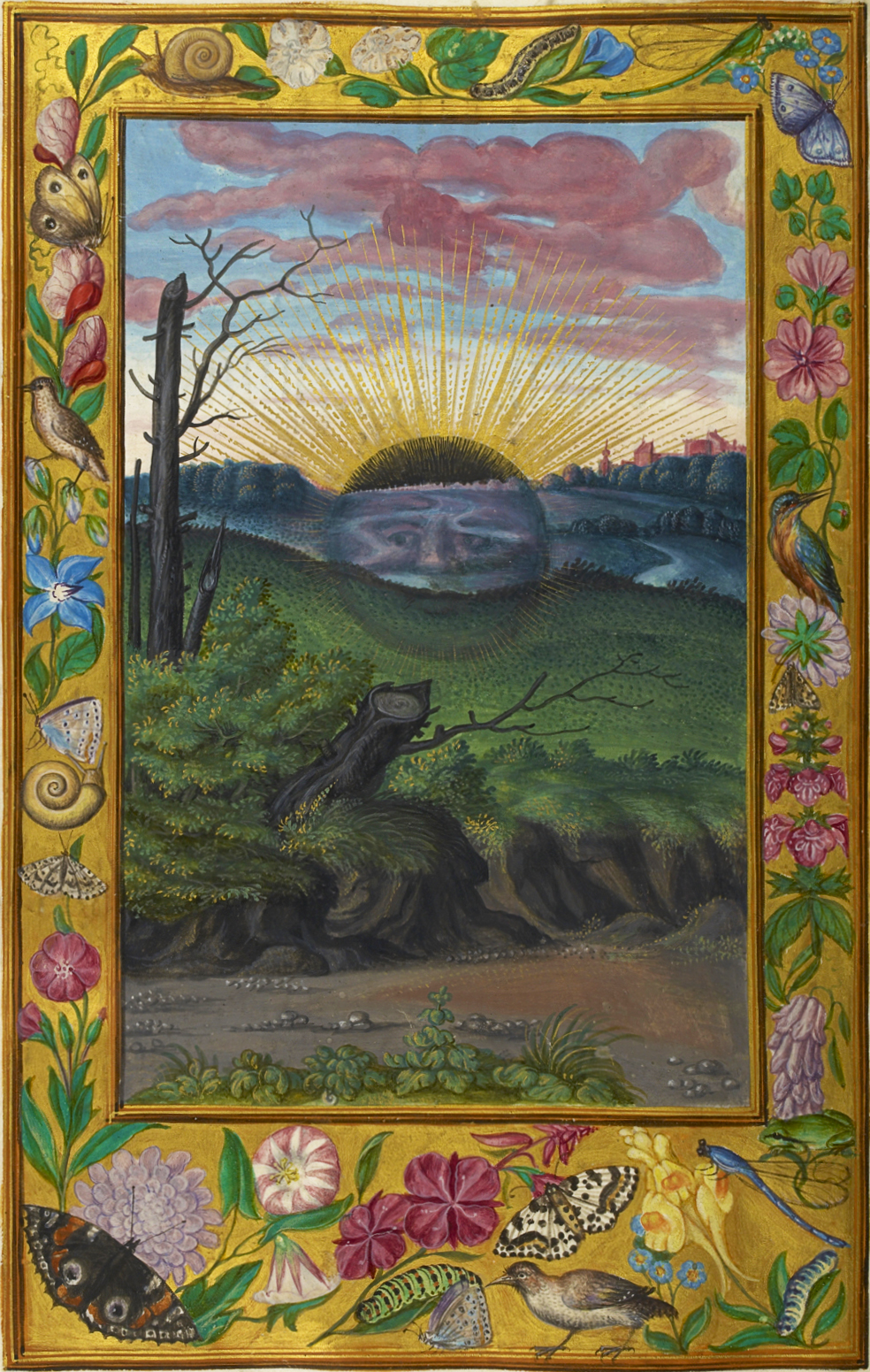
Fifth Treatise: the sun, bearing a human face, sets over a darkened, semi-transparent landscape with a walled city visible in the distance. The foreground is dominated by felled trees.

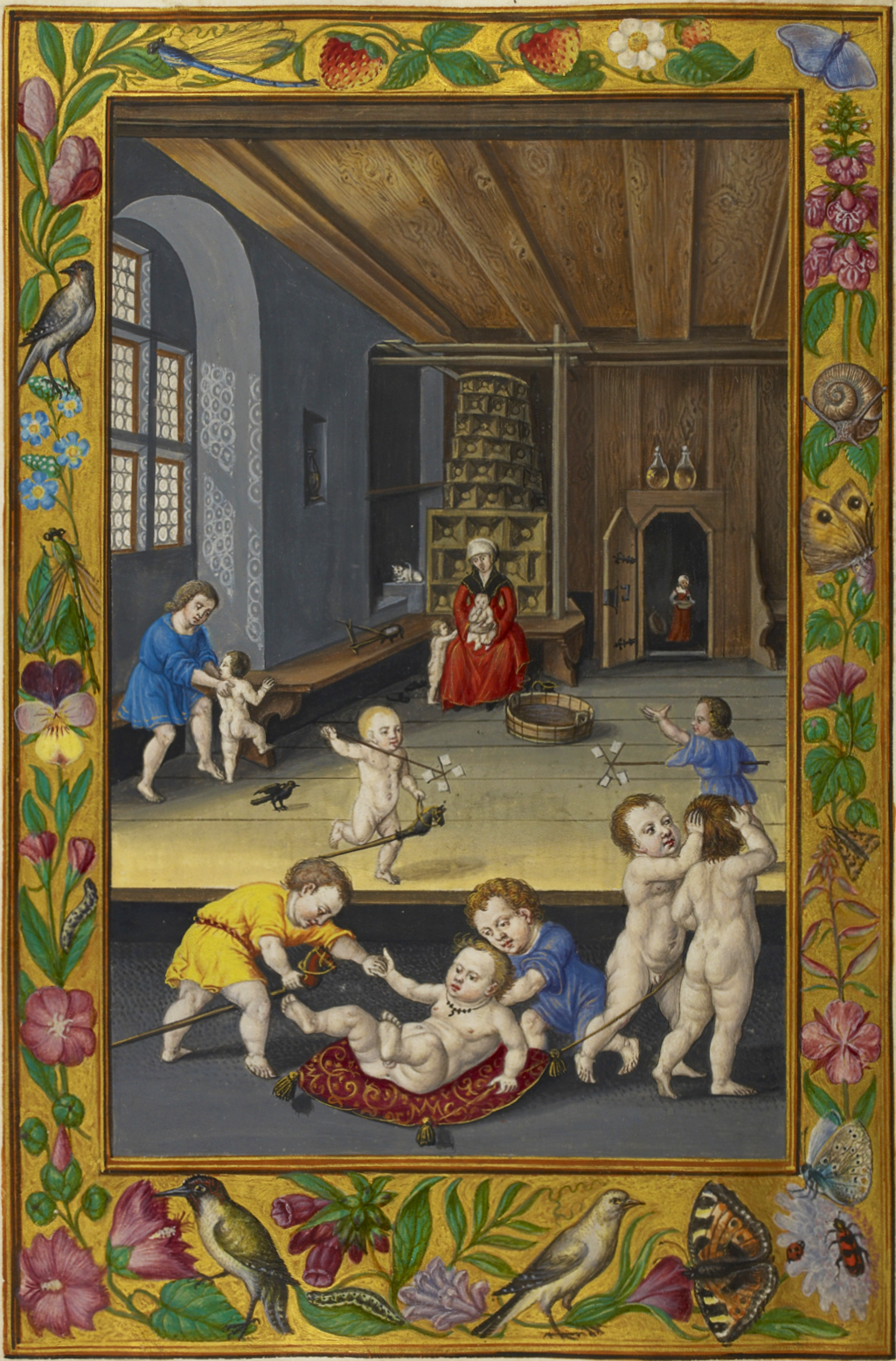
Fifth Treatise: mostly naked children shown chaotically playing in a room.

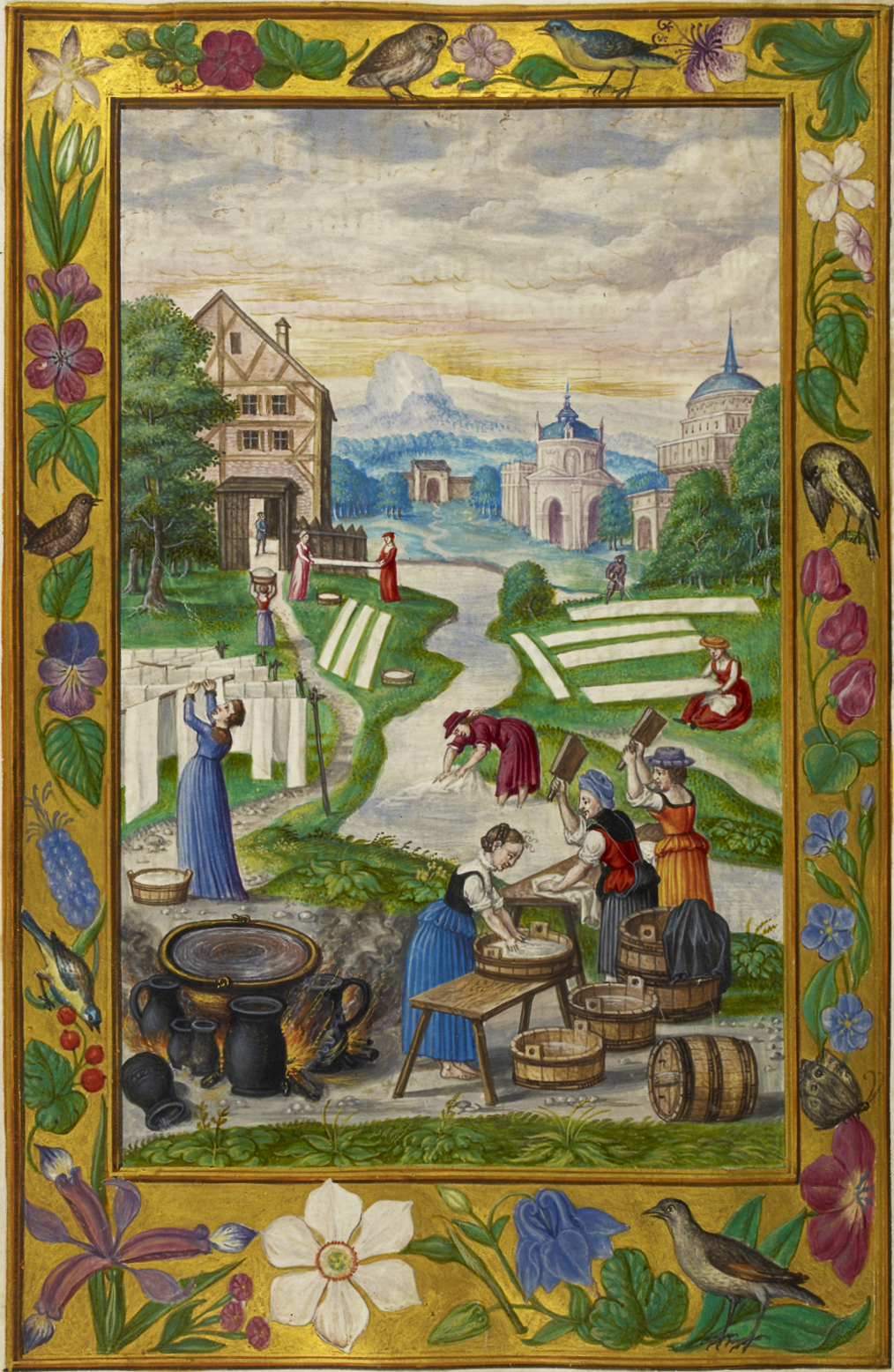
Fifth Treatise: women washing, hanging and sun drying laundry by a stream.

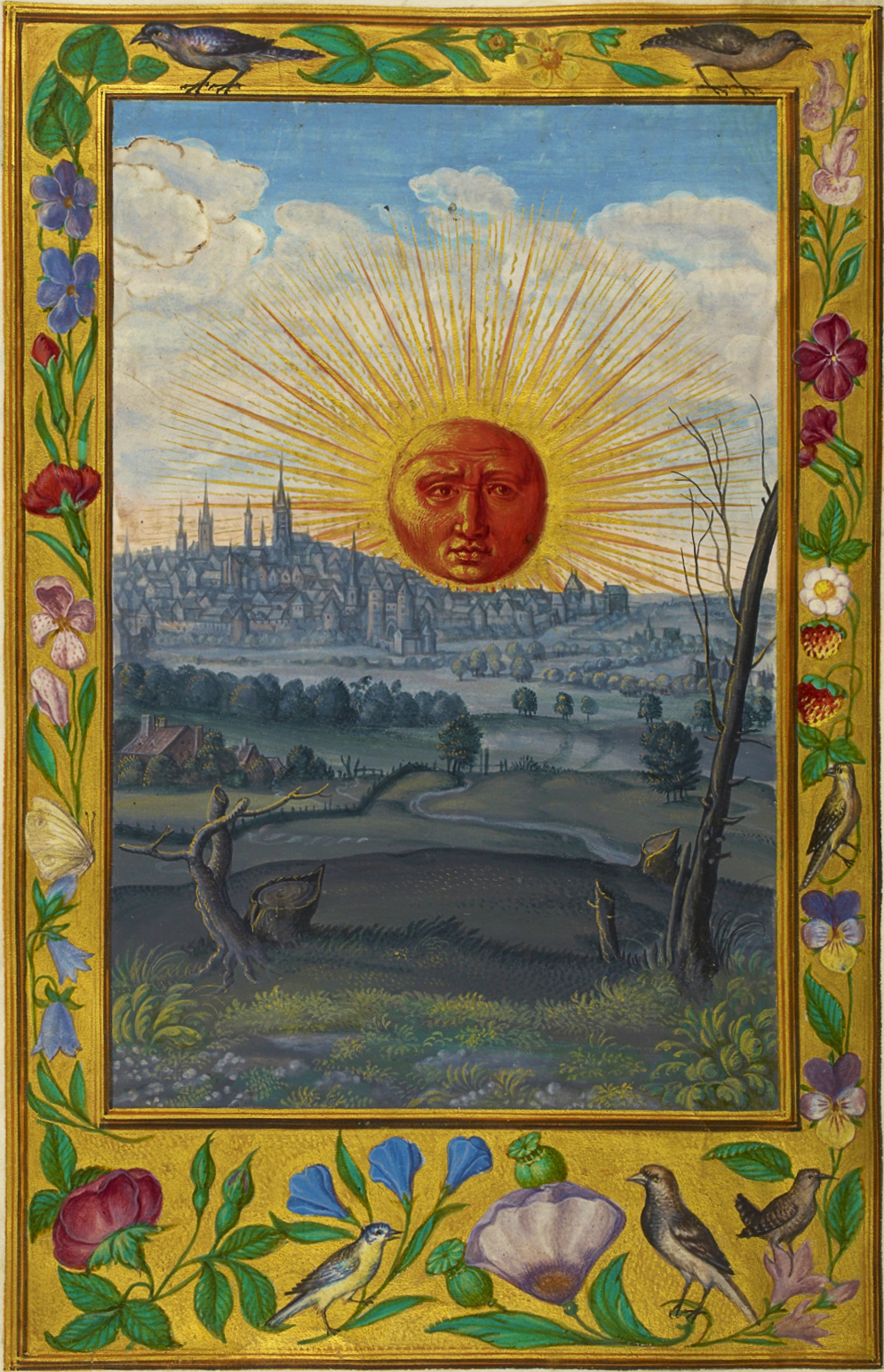
Fifth Treatise: red Sun, bearing a human face, rises over a shaded city and rural landscape. The foreground is dominated by felled trees. The borders are decorated with birds and flowers.
