= John of Gaddesden =

English physician

John of Gaddesden (1280–1361) was a medieval English physician. He wrote a treatise on medicine titled Rosa Medicinae (The Rose of Medicine), also called Rosa Anglica ("The English Rose"), between 1304 and 1317, considered to be the first English textbook of medicine. John of Gaddesden was also a Roman Catholic theologian, a fellow at Merton College, Oxford, a physician for members of the British royal family, and one of the most celebrated medical authorities of his time. His medical works, alongside those of Gilbertus Anglicus, "formed part of the core curriculum that underpinned the practice of medicine for the next 400 years".

== Career ==
John of Gaddesden was born about 1280, and wrote in the early part of the fourteenth century. He took his name from Gaddesden on the borders of Hertfordshire and Buckinghamshire, where an ancient house, opposite that gate of Ashridge Park which is nearest to the church of Little Gaddesden, is shown as his. He was a member of Merton College (Wood), and a doctor of physic of Oxford. He began to study medicine about 1299, and soon attained large practice in London.

He treated a son of Edward I, probably Thomas of Brotherton, for smallpox.

Between 1305 and 1307 he wrote a treatise on medicine, which soon became famous, entitled Rosa Medicinæ. He chose the name, he said, because as the rose has five sepals, so his book has five parts, and adds that as the rose excels all flowers, so his book excels all treatises on the practice of medicine. The title was probably suggested by Bernard de Gordon's Lilium Medicinæ, which appeared at Montpellier in 1303, and is quoted in the Rosa.

Gaddesden's book is often spoken of as Rosa Anglica. It is crammed with quotations from Galen, Pedanius Dioscorides, Rufus of Ephesus, Haliabbas, Serapion, Al Rhazis, Avicenna, Averroes, John of Damascus, Isaac, Masawaiyh, Gilbertus Anglicus, and from the Regimen sanitatis Salernitanum; but also contains a good many original remarks which illustrate the character of the author more than his medical knowledge. The book begins with an account of fevers based on Galen's arrangement, then goes through diseases and injuries beginning with the head, and ends with an antidotarium (a treatise on remedies). It contains some remarks on cooking, and innumerable prescriptions, many of which are superstitious, while others prove to be common-sense remedies when carefully considered. He cared for his gains, and boasts of getting a large price from the Barber surgeons' guild for a prescription of which the chief ingredient is tree frogs (Rosa, ed. Pavia, p. 120). His disposition, his peculiarities, and his reading are so precisely those of the "Doctour of Phisik" in Geoffrey Chaucer's prologue that it seems possible that Gaddesden is the contemporary from whom Chaucer drew this character.

Many manuscripts of the Rosa Medicinæ are extant. It was first printed at Pavia in 1492, again at Venice, 1502, and at Pavia, 1517, and for the last time at Augsburg in 1595 (two volumes). It was translated into Irish.

Gaddesden was in priest's orders, and was appointed to the stall of Wildland in St Paul's Cathedral, London, on 1 Aug 1342. He died in 1361.

The best account of his writings is in John Freind's History of Physick, 1726, ii. 277. This account contains the error, repeated by John Aikin's Biographical Memoirs of Medicine, 1780, p. 11, that he held the stall of Ealdland. The John de Gatesdone who held this stall was another person, and died before 1262.
