= Ricardus Anglicus (alchemist) =

Richardus Anglicus (14th century) was an English author of alchemical texts.

== Works ==
Richardus Anglicus the alchemist wrote several texts in the 14th century, including Correctorium alchemiae, also known as Corrector (fatuorum). He was considered among the leading English alchemists of the period. Texts attributed to him were printed in De Alchemia (1541, 1550) and in Theatrum Chemicum (1602–1661). He was well read in the alchemical literature through the 14th century and stands in that tradition, including concerns with the materia prima.

== Identity ==
The name Richardus Anglicus was, however, ambiguous. Historians of science have identified him variously with Richard of Wendover (by John Ferguson), with Robert of York (died c. 1348) (by Lynn Thorndike), and with Richard of Middleton (by Hermann Kopp). More recently, Joachim Telle disproved these attributions. José Rodriguez Guerrero concludes that the Correctorium alchemiae was composed by a person named Ricardus Anglicus in 1352-1362, while he was living in Avignon. He was someone connected with the world of law and gives two possible names:

Richard Wimundewold (fl.1340-1362), originally from Leicestershire and canon of Lincoln. He studied law at Oxford and was transferred in 1343 to the papal court, where he resided until his death. He held the highest rank among the lawyers of the curia and fulfilled diplomatic missions at the courts of Aragon, France and Naples. He appears as magister Ricardus Anglicus or dominus Richardus maior of Anglia.

The other candidate is Richard Drax (fl.1345-1361), a lawyer of canon law who arrived in Avignon in 1353 from the diocese of York. Called magister Richardus of Anglia, iuris civilis professor, he belonged to the Carmelite Order. His functions as a jurist were similar to Wimundewold's, although his political weight was much less, hence his colleague's appellation maior. He held offices with small revenues, such as the rectory of Harlow and canonries at Howden and Chichester.

According to Rodríguez Guerrero, the author of the Correctorium alchemiae is an expert in canon law, who understands alchemy as a natural science, acquired on the basis of Aristotelian empiricism, where experience and observation are the keys to finding the modus optimus naturae. Ricardus classifies the alchemists of his time into three groups. The first and largest group follows "useless and stupid recipes". A second, small group would handle "particular procedures", inspired by the physical laws of nature (philosophia naturalis), which provided elixirs of a certain utility. Finally, there would be a third and very small group capable of carrying out a "universal procedure", where art perfectly imitates nature and accompanies its processes to produce an extraordinary elixir. His division between universals and particulars is taken from aristotelianism, where the universal is categorical, fixed and necessary, while the particular is something linked to the subject's sensitive and changing perception. Throughout his argument, Ricardus never strays from a canonical pattern. He always speaks in terms of natural science and the expression donum Dei is elucidated as a simple motivational gift, of service to God.

The addressee of this treaty would be another man with whom he had met in Avignon, named Bernard of Trier (not to be confused with the fictional Italian alchemist Bernard Trevisan), whom Rodríguez Guerrero identifies with Eberhard von der Marck-Aremberg (1305–1387), a law graduate and clergyman, who became chorbishop of Cologne before leaving the church to marry. He further argues that Bernard of Trier is also the author of the later version of the text entitled Correctio fatuorum.

== Bibliography ==
- Joachim Telle: Ricardus Anglicus. In: Verfasserlexikon. 2. Auflage. Vol. 8, 1992, pp. 38–41.
