= Gilbertus Anglicus =

Gilbertus Anglicus (or Gilbert of England, also known as Gilbertinus; c. 1180 – c. 1250) was a medieval English physician. He is known chiefly for his encyclopedic work, the Compendium of Medicine (Compendium Medicinæ), most probably written between 1230 and 1250. This medical treatise was an attempt at a comprehensive overview of the best practice in pharmacology, medicine, and surgery at the time. His medical works, alongside those of John of Gaddesden, "formed part of the core curriculum that underpinned the practice of medicine for the next 400 years".

== Life ==
Little is securely known of the detail of the life of Gilbert. Born about 1180, he received his early education in England before leaving for Europe. It is known that he studied at Western Europe's first and foremost school of medicine, the Schola Medica Salernitana at Salerno, Italy, most probably under the famed surgeon, Roger of Parma. He returned to England to serve under Archbishop Hugo Walter, but left England again some time after the archbishop's death in 1205. It is thought that he spent the remainder of his life on the continent, gaining the soubriquet Gilbert the Englishman from his land of origin.

His major work, the Compendium Medicinae, written in Latin, was produced at some time after the year 1230. The work, running to seven books, is an attempt to provide a comprehensive encyclopedia of medical and surgical knowledge as it existed in his day. Gilbert does not claim to be the originator of most of the material in his book. He quotes extensively from Roger of Parma, and acknowledges that his work is indebted to Greek physicians including Galen, Hippocrates and Theophilus Protospatharius, Arab physicians such as Averroes and Avicenna, as well as a number of the Salernitan Masters of Italy. The Compendium covers the full range of medical and significantly also the surgical treatments in use at the time.

Gilbert was one of the most famous European physicians of the period. His fame lasted for centuries after his death. His Compendium was published in print in 1510, and was reprinted again as late as 1608. Gilbert is listed with the great physicians of all time in the verse of Chaucer.

Wel knew he the olde Esculapius

And Deyscorides and eek Rufus,

Olde Ypocras, Haly and Galyen,

Serapion, Razis and Avycen,

Averrois, Damascien and Constantyn,

Bernard and Gatesden and Gilbertyn.

== Works ==
- Compendium Medicinae (ca.1230)

- sources named are; Pythagoras, Hippocrates, Plato, Aristotle, Galen, Rufus, Macrobius, Boethius, Alexander of Tralles, Theodoras Priscianus, Theophilus Philaretes, Stephanon (of Athens?), the Arabians Haly Abbas, Rhazes, Isaac Judaeus, Joannitius, Janus Damascenus, Jacobus Alucindi, Avicenna and Averroes; the Salernian writers, quoted generally as Salernitani and specifically Constantine Africanus, Nicholas Praepositus, Romoaldus Ricardus and Maurus, and two otherwise unknown authors, Torror and Funcius.

== Translations ==
Gilbertus's Compendium medicinae was translated into Middle English in the early 15th century. The gynecological and obstetrical portions of that translation were soon excerpted and circulated widely as an independent text known in modern scholarship as The Sickness of Women. That text was then modified further in the mid-15th century by the addition of materials from Muscio and other sources on obstetrics; this is known as The Sickness of Women 2. Between them, the two versions of The Sickness of Women were the most widely circulated Middle English texts on women's medicine in the 15th century, even more popular than the several Middle English versions of the Trotula texts.

== Bibliography ==
- Henry Ebenezer Handerson: Gilbertus Anglicus - Medicine of the Thirteenth Century. 1918.
- Faye Marie Getz: Healing & Society in Medieval England - A Middle English Translation of the Pharmaceutical Writings of Gilbertus Anglicus. University of Wisconsin Press 1991. ISBN 0-299-12930-6.
- Michael R. McVaugh, “Who Was Gilbert the Englishman?,” in The Study of Medieval Manuscripts of England: Festschrift in Honor of Richard W. Pfaff, ed. George Hardin Brown and Linda Ehrsam Voigts (Tempe, AZ: Arizona Center for Medieval and Renaissance Studies, 2011; Turnhout: Brepols, 2011), pp. 295–324.
- Monica H. Green and Linne R. Mooney, "The Sickness of Women," in Sex, Aging, and Death in a Medieval Medical Compendium: Trinity College Cambridge MS R.14.52, Its Texts, Language, and Scribe, ed. M. Teresa Tavormina, Medieval & Renaissance Texts and Studies, 292, 2 vols. (Tempe, AZ: Arizona Center for Medieval and Renaissance Studies, 2006), vol. 2, pp. 455–568. ISBN 9780866983358.
- Handerson, Henry E. Gilbertus Anglicus Medicine of the Thirteenth Century. Printellegra company. ISBN 9781449981945.
- Bachoffner Pierre. Gilbert l'Anglais ou Gilbert de Paris ? : Gundolf Keil, Magister Giselbertus de villa parisiensis. Betrachtungen zu den Kranewittbeeren und Gilberts pharmakologischem Renomm, Revue d'histoire de la pharmacie, 1995, vol. 83, n° 305, pp. 207–208.
