= Richard de Morins =

13th-century English canon lawyer

Richard de Morins (c. 1161–1242), also known as Richard of Mores, Richard de Mores, Ricardus de Mores, and Ricardus Anglicus was an English Augustinian canon of Merton Priory, before becoming prior at Dunstable Priory in 1202.

== Life ==
Nothing is known of Morins' parentage, but he seems to have been a personage of importance, and a lay namesake who held lands in Berkshire is several times mentioned in the Close and Patent Rolls as in John's service. In February 1203, Morins was sent by the king to Rome, in order to obtain the pope's aid in arranging peace with France, and returned in July with John of Ferentino, cardinal-deacon of Santa Maria in Via Lata, as papal legate. In 1206, the cardinal constituted Morins visitor of the religious houses in the diocese of Lincoln.

In 1212, Morins was employed on the inquiry into the losses of the church through the interdict. He also acted for the preachers of the crusade in the counties of Huntingdon, Bedford, and Hertford. In 1214–15, Morins was one of the three ecclesiastics appointed to investigate the election of Hugh of Northwold as abbot of St. Edmund's. Later, in 1215, Morins was present at the Lateran council, and on his way home remained at Paris for a year to study in the theological schools.

In 1222, Morins was employed in the settlement of the dispute between the Bishop of London and the Abbey of Westminster, and in the next year was visitor for his order in the province of York. In 1228, he was again visitor for his order in the dioceses of Lichfield and Lincoln. In 1239, Morins drew up the case for submission to the pope as to the Archbishop of Canterbury's right of visiting the monasteries in the sees of his suffragans. In 1241, he was one of those to whom letters of absolution for the Canterbury monks were addressed. Morins died on 9 April 1242.

== Jurist ==
As archdeacon of Bologna, Morins was an English priest who was rector of the law school at the University of Bologna in 1226, and who, by new methods of explaining legal proceedings, became recognized as the pioneer of scientific judicial procedure in the twelfth century.

Morins' long-lost work Ordo Judiciarius was discovered in a manuscript by Wunderlich in Douai and published by Witt in 1851. A more correct manuscript was subsequently discovered at Brussels by Sir Travers Twiss.

Probably Morins graduated in Paris, as a papal bull of 1218 refers to "Ricardus Anglicus doctor Parisiensis", but there is no evidence to connect him with Oxford. He also wrote glosses on the papal decretals, and distinctions on the Decree of Gratian. He must be distinguished from his contemporary, Ricardus Anglicanus, a physician.

== Prior ==
Morins was a canon at Merton Priory when King John brought him to Dunstable. At the time, he was only a deacon, but was ordained priest on 21 September. He was an effective leader. Around 1207–1210, he obtained some of the relics of Saint Fremund from a shrine at Cropredy for a new shrine at the Priory This drew many of the pilgrims as they made their way to St Albans to the south, and greatly enhanced the local economy.

From 1210 Morins took over as Dunstable's chronicler, continuing it until his death. He preached crusade in 1212, and attended the Lateran council of 1215, after which he remained in Paris for a year to study at the University; but the annals show that he maintained all through his life a keen interest in the affairs of Europe and the East. In 1206 he was made a visitor for all the religious houses of the diocese of Lincoln (except those of the exempt orders), by the authority of the papal legate; in 1212 he was appointed by the pope to preach the cross in Bedfordshire, Hertfordshire and Huntingdonshire, and in the same year was commissioned to make an estimate of the losses suffered by the clergy and the religious in the diocese through the exactions of King John. In 1223 and 1228 he was made visitor to his own order, first in the province of York, and afterward in the dioceses of Lincoln and Coventry; and last of all, in 1239, when he must have been quite an old man, he helped to draw up and submit to the pope an account of the difficulties between the Archbishop of Canterbury and his suffragans on the subject of visitation.
