= Deutsches Theatrum Chemicum =

The Deutsche Theatrum Chemicum is a collection of alchemical texts, predominantly in German translation, which was published in Nuremberg in three volumes (1728, 1730, 1732) by Friedrich Roth-Scholtz (1687–1736), the publisher, printer and bibliographer.

The Deutsches Theatrum Chemicum follows in the tradition of earlier collections, such as the seventeenth-century Theatrum Chemicum and Jean-Jacques Manget's Bibliotheca Chemica Curiosa (Geneva, 1702), though these collections are in Latin rather than German. The selection of texts presented here is also quite different. Roth-Scholtz wanted above all to present and link the philosophical connections between the texts, and, as he says himself, lets the texts affect the reader like actors in a theater appearing one after the other. The texts also include more curious selections, such as legal advice on which spouse owns silverware which has been transmuted into gold. This also makes it clear that Roth-Scholtz was aiming the book at a wider, bourgeois readership than did the editors of the earlier Latin language editions, which largely appealed to scholars.

John Ferguson praised the book for their introductions and biographical information, which are printed with material not otherwise accessible, such as the studies of Georg Wolfgang Wedel on Basilius Valentinus. The book contains illustrations, including a portrait of Roth-Scholtz himself.

Roth-Scholtz writes in the final volume that he had just about finished a fourth volume. In fact, this planned volume never appeared. A second edition appeared in Frankfurt and Leipzig between 1767 and 1772.

== Contents ==
The full title reads: Deutsches theatrum chemicum, auf welchem der berühmtesten Philosophen und Alchymisten Schrifften, die von dem Stein der Weisen, von Verwandlung der schlechten Metalle in bessere, von Kräutern, von Thieren, von Gesund- und Sauer-Brunnen, von warmen Bädern, von herrlichen Artzneyen und von andern grossen Geheimnüssen der Natur handeln, welche bisshero entweder niemahls gedruckt, oder doch sonsten sehr rar worden sind, vorgestellet werden durch Friederich Roth-Scholtzen

=== Volume 1 ===
- Jo. Francisci Buddei (Johann Franz Buddeus): Untersuchung von der Alchemie (p. 1-146)
- Georg Philipp Nenters Bericht von der Alchemie (p. 147-218);
- Wilhelm von Schröder: Wilhelm Greyherr von Schröderns Unterricht zum Goldmachen (p. 219-288)
- Treuhertzige Warnungs-Vermahnung an alle Liebhaber der Natur-gemesen Alchemie (p. 289-312)
- Leonhard Müllners gründlicher Bericht von der Generation und Geburth der Metallen (p. 313-330)
- Bericht von Generation und Regeneration der Metallen (p. 331-358)
- Josaphat Friederich Hautnortons, oder Johann Harprechts, dritter Anfang der Mineralischen Dinge vom Philosophischen Saltz (p. 339-390)
- Chrys du Puris, Pontische oder Mercurial-Wasser der Weisen (p. 391-415)
- Eugenii Phialethae (Eugenius Philalethes), Euphrates, oder die Wasser vom Anfang (p. 415-480)
- Johann Friedrich Schweitzer (Helvetius): Jo. Friederich Helvetii, guldenes Kalb (p. 481-556)
- Joh. Pordaesche (John Pordage, 1607–1681), Philosophisches Sendschreiben von dem Stein der Weisheit (p. 557-596)
- Johannes de Monte Raphaim (a pseudonym), Vorbothe der am Philosophischen Himmel hervor brechenden Morgenröthe (p. 597-638)
- Register (p. 638-651)
- Fr. Basilii Valentini (Basilius Valentinus), TriumphWagen des Antimonii, mit Theodori Kerckringii Anmerckungen. Deme noch vorgesetzet: Herrn D. Georg Wolfg. Wedels, berühmten Professoris zu Jena, Anno 1704 in einem Programmate von Basilio Valentino ertheilte Nachricht und recommendation (p. 654-668, Introduction by Friedrich Roth-Scholtz)

=== Volume 2 ===
The volume is dedicated to the art patron Franz Anton von Sporck.

- Bened. Nicolai Petraei, Critique über die Alchymistischen Schriften (p. 1-86)
- Bedencken über die Frage, ob die Transmutatio Metallorum möglich sey? (p. 87-113)
- Responsum einer berühmten Juristen-Facultät: da sich ein Ehemann belehren lässet: Ob ihm das seiner Frauen in Gold transmutirte silberne Gefässe nicht zukomme? Oder doch wenigstens der usus fructus davon? (p. 113-118)
- (Julius Sperber) Isagoge, d.i. Einleitung zur wahren Erkänntnuß des Drey-einigen Gottes und der Natur. Worinnen auch viele vortreffliche Dinge von der Materia des Philosophischen Steins enthalten sind (p. 119-196)
- Pantaleonis (Franz Gassmann), Tumulus Hermetis Apertus; oder: das eröffnete Hermetische Grab (p. 197-258)
- Pantaleonis Examen Alchymisticum, oder: Alchymistische Prüffung (p. 259-312)
- Pantaleonis Bifolium Metallicum, das ist: Metallisches Zweyblat (p. 313-380)
- Joel Langelotts, Send-Schreiben von der Chymie; samt der Philosophischen Mühle in Kupffer gestochen (p. 381-406)
- Johann Heinrich Rudolffs, Unterricht von der Amalgamation (p. 409-430)
- Johann Heinrich Rudolffs, Extra-Ordinair Bergwerck, durch die Amalgamation mit Quecksilber (p. 431-498)
- Johannis Garlandii, seu Hortulani, Compendium Alchimæ, oder Erklärung der Smaragdischen Tafel Hermetis Trismegisti (p. 499-530)
- Tabula Smaragdina Hermetis (p. 531-532)
- Arnaldus de Villanova, M. Arnoldi de Villanova, Erklärung über den Commentarium Hortulani (p. 533-550)
- Send-Schreiben von der Vortrefflichkeit der Chymischen Schrifften Petri Joh. Fabri (p. 551-566)
- Bartholomäi Korndorffers Beschreibung der Edelgesteine (p. 567-619)
- Johann Joachim Becher, D. Joh. Joachim Bechers Oedipus Chymicus, oder Chymischer Rätseldeuter (p. 619-822)
- Jean D'Espagnet, Joannes d´Espagnets geheime Werck der hermetischen Philosophie (p. 823-912)

=== Volume 3 ===
This volume contains primarily texts attributed to Roger Bacon, sometimes incorrectly. Roth-Scholtz discusses Bacon and John Dee in the Preface.

- Rogerii Baconis, Chymisch- und Philosophische Schrifften, die zum Theil in Deutscher Sprache nach niemals gedruckt; sondern zum erstenmal aus dem Englischen übersetzet worden; Vorrede von Friedrich Roth-Scholtzen (p. 1-22)
- Rogerii Baconis, Radix Mundi oder Wurtzel der Welt. Verdeutscht nach dem Englischen von William Salmon (p. 23-72)
- Rogerii Baconis, Medulla Alchemiæ, darinnen vom Stein der Weisen, und von den vornehmsten Tincturen des Goldes, Vitriols und Antimonii, gehandelt wird (p. 73-102)
- Rogerii Baconis, Tractat vom Golde, oder gründlicher Bericht von der Bereitung des Philosophischen Steins, so aus dem Golde gemacht wird (p. 103-128)
- Rogerii Baconis, Spiegel der Alchemie (p. 105-179)
- Rogerii Baconis, Tractat von der Tinctur und Oel des Vitriols, welchen er als ein edel, köstlich, und allergewissestes Secretum und Medicin der Menschen und Metallen, seinem geliebten Bruder Wilhelmo communiciret (p. 180-203)
- Rogerii Baconis, Tractat von der Tinctur und Oel des Antimonii, von der wahren und rechten Bereitung des Spießglases, menschliche Schwachheiten und Kranckheiten dadurch zu heilen, und die imperfecten Metallen in Verbesserung zu setzen (p. 205-226)
- Epistel oder Send-Brief des Kayser Alexandri, welcher zuerst in Griechenland und Macedonien regieret hat, auch ein Kayser der Persianer gewesen: Darinnen der Stein der Weisen durch ein Gleichnüß und Parabel sehr lustig und wohl beschrieben erkläret wird (p. 227-244)
- Rogerii Baconis, Send-Schreiben von geheimen Würckungen der Kunst und der Natur, und von der Nichtigkeit der falschen Magiæ (p. 246-286)
- Epistola de Secretis operibus artis & naturæ, & de nullitate Magiæ. Opera Johannis Dee, è pluribus exemplaribus castigata olim (p. 287-348)
- Responsum ad Fratres Rosaceæ Crucis illustris (p. 349-356)
- Gloria Mundi, sonsten Paradeiß-Tafel: das ist: Beschreibung der uhralten Wissenschaft, welche Adam von Gott selbst erlernet, Noa, Abraham, und Salomon, als eine der höchsten Gaben Gottes gebraucht (p. 357-510)
- Ein anander Tractätlein gleiches Inhalts mit dem vorigen (p. 511-537)
- Alethophili Philosophische Betrachtung von Verwandelung der Metallen. Aus dem Lateinischen ins Deutsche übersetzet (p. 537-560)
- Warnungs-Vorrede wider die Betrüger, welche ein Anonymus A. 1670 und A. 1691 in Hamburg des Johannis Ticinensis, Anthonii de Abbatia und Edovardi Kellæi Chymischen Schriften vorgesetzet hat (p. 561-606)
- Johannis Ticinensis, eines Böhmischen Priesters, Chymische Schrifften; oder Proceß vom Stein der Weisen (p. 607-650)
- Anthonii Abbatia, eines in der Philosophischen Kunst erfahrnen Priesters, ausgefertigtes Send-Schreiben von dem Stein der Weisen, und von Verwandlung der Metallen. Aus dem Lateinischen ins Deutsche übersetzet (S. 651-680)
- Reverendissimi Archipresbyteri Magistri Anthonii de Abbatia Epistolæ duæ (...) (p. 681-732)
- Edward Kelley, Edovradi Kellæi, Buch von dem Stein der Weisen. An den Römischen Kayser Rudolphum II. ANNO MDXCVI. In Lateinischer Sprache geschrieben; Hernach in die Deutsche übersetzet (p. 733-798)
- Fragmenta quædam Edov. Kellæi ex ipsius Epistolis excerpta (p. 799-800)
- Edovardi Kellæi, Via Humida, sive Discursus de Menstruo Vegetabili Saturni (p. 801-854)
- (Thomas Vaughan) Aula Lucis, ider: Das Hauß des Lichts, durch S. N. * * * in Englischer Sprache beschrieben, und Anno 1690 in das Deutsche übersetzet durch Johann Langen /M.C. (p. 855-892).

== Links ==
- Digitized copy, Bayerische Staatsbibliothek
- Stefan Laube, Deutsches Theatrum Chemicum, pdf
- Alchemy Website, Table of Contents

== See also ==
- Theatrum Chemicum
- Verae alchemiae artisque metallica
