= Walter Needham =

English physician and anatomist

Walter Needham (1631?–5 April 1691) was an English physician, known as an anatomist.

== Life ==
Needham was from Shropshire. Educated as a queen's scholar at Westminster School, he was elected to Trinity College, Cambridge, in 1650, admitted as a pensioner on 17 June 1650. In 1654 he graduated B.A., and on 25 July 1655 he was admitted a Fellow of Queens' College. At Trinity in the 1650s there was a scientific group, in which Needham participated, involving also Alexander Akehurst, Isaac Barrow, John Nidd, John Ray, and Francis Willughby. He left the university to practise medicine for a short time in Shropshire, in 1659. He also held the manor of West Bromwich.

In 1660 Needham was living in Oxford and attending the lectures of Thomas Willis, Thomas Millington and his schoolfellow Richard Lower. There he met Anthony Wood, and associated with some of the founders of the Royal Society. He subsequently returned to Cambridge, and took the degree of doctor of physic from Queens' College on 5 July 1664. He was in December 1664 admitted an honorary fellow of the College of Physicians of London, a grade of fellow just brought in by Sir Edward Alston, the President. Needham, according to Wood, had much practice. His patients included Sir Robert Long, 1st Baronet, with a chronic condition.

Admitted a Fellow of the Royal Society in 1667, on 7 November 1672 Needham was appointed physician to Sutton's Charity (the London Charterhouse) in succession to George Castle. In 1681 he was living in Great Queen Street, Broad Sanctuary. He was created a fellow of the Royal College of Physicians under the charter of James II, and was admitted on 12 April 1687.

Needham died, according to Wood, on 5 April 1691, and was buried in the church of St. Giles-in-the-Fields, near London. Executions were out against him to seize both body and goods.

== Works ==
On 4 August 1667 Needham's Disquisitio anatomica de formato Fœtu was licensed to be printed; in this book he states that he was then living a long way from London. His major published work, apart from papers in the Philosophical Transactions, it was dedicated to Robert Boyle, and published by Radulph Needham at the Bell in Little Britain. It was reprinted at Amsterdam in 1668, and was included by Daniel Le Clerc and Jean-Jacques Manget in their Bibliotheca Anatomica (1699). The book deals with the placenta in man and animals, and was written in idiomatic Latin. It was the first publication to mention chemical experiments on embryos, and gave instructions for their dissection.

In 1673 Needham read a paper before the Royal Society giving the results of some experiments he had made with Richard Wiseman. They concerned the value of Denis's newly discovered liquor for stopping arterial bleeding.

== Notes ==
Attribution

This article incorporates text from a publication now in the public domain: Lee, Sidney, ed. (1894). "Needham, Walter". Dictionary of National Biography. Vol. 40. London: Smith, Elder & Co.
