= Genevieve of Brabant =

Fictional heroine in medieval legend

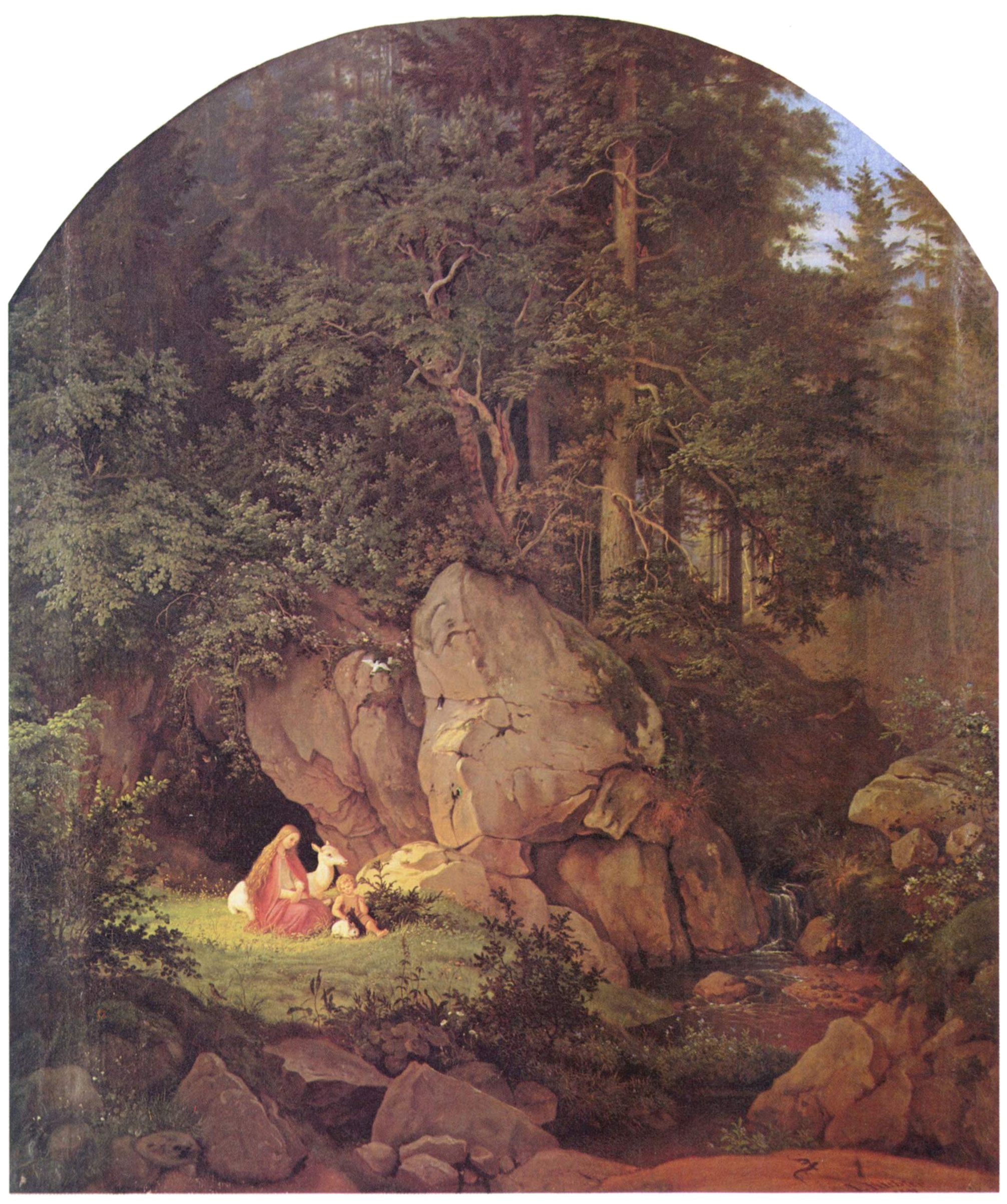
Genoveva in the Forest Seclusion by Adrian Ludwig Richter

Genevieve (also Genoveva or Genoveffa) of Brabant is the heroine of a late medieval legend based on the motif of the virtuous wife falsely accused of infidelity.

== Legend ==
Her story is a typical example of the widespread tale of the chaste wife falsely accused and repudiated, generally on the word of a rejected suitor. Genoveffa of Brabant was said to be the wife of the palatine Siegfried of Treves, and was falsely accused by the majordomo Golo. Sentenced to death, she was spared by the executioner and lived for six years with her son in a cave in the Ardennes nourished by a roe. Siegfried, who had meanwhile found out Golo's treachery, was chasing the roe when he discovered her hiding-place, and reinstated her in her former honour.

Her story is said to rest on the history of Marie of Brabant, wife of Louis II, Duke of Bavaria and Count Palatine of the Rhine. Marie of Brabant was suspected of infidelity and subsequently tried by her husband, found guilty and beheaded on 18 January 1256. When the verdict was shown to be mistaken, Louis had to do penance for the beheading. The change in name from Marie to Genevieve may be traced back to a cult of St Genevieve, patroness of Paris.

The Genevieve tale first obtained wide popularity in L'Innocence reconnue, ou vie de Sainte Genevieve de Brabant (pr. 1638) by the Jesuit René de Cerisiers (1603–1662), and was a frequent subject for dramatic representation in Germany. Starting in the mid-18th century, it became very popular among traveling puppet companies.

== Variants ==
Genoveffa 's history may be compared to the Scandinavian ballads of Ravengaard og Memering, which exist in many recensions. These deal with the history of Gunild, the wife of Henry Duke of Brunswick and Schleswig. When Duke Henry went to the war he left his wife in charge of Ravengaard, who accused her of infidelity. Gunild is cleared by the victory of her champion Memering, the smallest of Christian men. The Scottish ballad of Sir Aldingar is a version of the same story. The heroine Gunhilda is said to have been the daughter of Canute the Great and Emma. In 1036 she married King Henry, afterwards the emperor Henry III, and there was nothing in her domestic history to warrant the legend, which is given as authentic history by William of Malmesbury (De gestis regum Anglorum, lib.ii.~i88). She was called Cunigund after her marriage, and perhaps was confused with St Cunigund, the wife of the Emperor Henry II.

In the Karlamagnus-saga the innocent wife is Oliva, sister of Charlemagne and wife of King Hugo, and in the French Carolingian cycle the emperor's wife Sibille (La Reine Sibille) or Blanchefleur (Macaire). Other forms of the legend are to be found in the story of Doolin's mother in Doon de Mayence, the English romance of Sir Triamour, in the story of the mother of Octavian in Octavian the Emperor, in the German folk book Historie von der geduldigen Königin Crescentia, based on a 12th-century poem to be found in the Kaiserchronik, and the English Erl of Toulouse (c. 1400). In the last-named romance it has been suggested that the story gives the relations between Bernard I, Count of Toulouse, son of the Guillaume d'Orange of the Carolingian romances, and the empress Judith, second wife of Louis the Pious—who were indeed charged with adultery and purged themselves by an oath and an offer for trial by combat, although the historical situation has been embellished with romantic incident.

== Adaptations ==
- Leben und Tod der heiligen Genoveva, poem by Ludwig Tieck (1799)
- Golo und Genoveffa, drama by Maler Müller (1811)
- Genoveffa, story by Christoph von Schmid (1825)
- Genoveffa, story in Gustav Schwab's collection Das Buch der schönsten Geschichten und Sagen (1837)
- Genoveva, play by Christian Friedrich Hebbel (1843)
- Genoveva, opera by Robert Schumann (1850), which draws on Hebbel's play and also on Tieck's poem
- Geneviève de Brabant, opéra bouffe by Jacques Offenbach (1859) based loosely on the legend
- Genovena, novel by Alphonse de Lamartine (1860)
- Genoveva, play by Mathilde Wesendonck (1866)
- Geneviève de Brabant, stage work by Erik Satie (c. 1900)
- Golo und Genoveffa , by Hanna Rademacher (1914)
- Suor Angelica, opera by Giacomo Puccini (1918) said by the publisher, Casa Ricordi, to have been inspired by Hebbel's play
- Genoveva van Brabant, by Stijn Streuvels (1920–1921)
- Genoveffa di Brabante, 1947 Italian film by Primo Zeglio
- La Leggenda di Genoveffa, 1952 Italian film
- Genova, 1953 Tamil-Malayalam film of F. Nagoor, based on a musical play by T. C. Acyuta Menon, itself inspired by Johann Ernst Hanxleden's Malayalam version of the story.
- Genoveffa di Brabante, 1964 Italian/Spanish film produced by José Luis Monter

== Literary references ==
In Marcel Proust's In Search of Lost Time (1913–27), the narrator remembers a magic lantern he had in his room, in Combray, that showed the image of Golo riding his horse towards Genevieve's castle. He says: "... and I would fall into the arms of my mother, whom the misfortunes of Geneviève de Brabant had made all the dearer to me, just as the crimes of Golo had driven me to a more than ordinarily scrupulous examination of my own conscience."

In Chapter II of Volume One of his Reminiscences (1907–09), Carl Schurz recalls the puppet play of Die Schöne Genovefa (lit. 'The Beautiful Genevieve') which he used to see performed in his youth. Its plot is an adaptation of the tale of Genevieve of Brabant.

== General and cited references ==
Attribution
