= Macaire =

Macaire is a given name and surname associated with medieval France, although it appears to have several claims of origin. It was originally a male name, and later came to be considered a male or female name. Macaire is also the common name for a 12th-century French chanson de geste, named for one of its main characters.

== People ==
People with the surname include:

- David Macaire, Archbishop of Martinique
- Maurice Macaire, French footballer in the 1900 Olympics
- Robert Macaire (diplomat), British diplomat
- Robert Macaire (character), a villainous character in French fiction

== In fiction ==
Macaire is the name of the main character in two works, Macaire and La Reine Sibille (14th century), both versions of the story of the false accusation brought against the queen of Charlemagne, called "Blanchefleur" in Macaire and "Sibille" in the later poem. Macaire is only preserved in the Franco-Venetian Geste of Charlemagne (Bibl. St Mark MS. fr. xiii.). La Reine Sibille only exists in fragments, but the tale is given in the chronicle of Alberic Trium Fontium, a monk of the Cistercian monastery of Trois Fontanes in the diocese of Chlons, and in a prose version. Macaire is the product of the fusion of two legends: that of the unjustly repudiated wife and that of the dog who detects the murderer of his master. For the former motive see Genevieve de Brabant. The second is found in Plutarch, Script. moral., ed. Didot ii. (1186), where a dog, like Aubri's hound, stayed three days without food by the body of its master, and subsequently attacked the murderers, thus leading to their discovery. The duel between Macaire and the dog is paralleled by an interpolation by Giraldus Cambrensis in a manuscript of the Hexameron of Ambrose. Aubri's hound received the name of the "dog of Montargis," because a representation of the story was painted on a chimney-piece in the chateau of Montargis in the 15th century.

The tale was early divorced from Carolingian tradition, and Jean de la Taille, in his Discours notable des duels (Paris, 1607), places the incident under Charles V.

== See also ==
- Saint-Macaire (disambiguation)
