= Edmund King (physician) =

English surgeon and physician

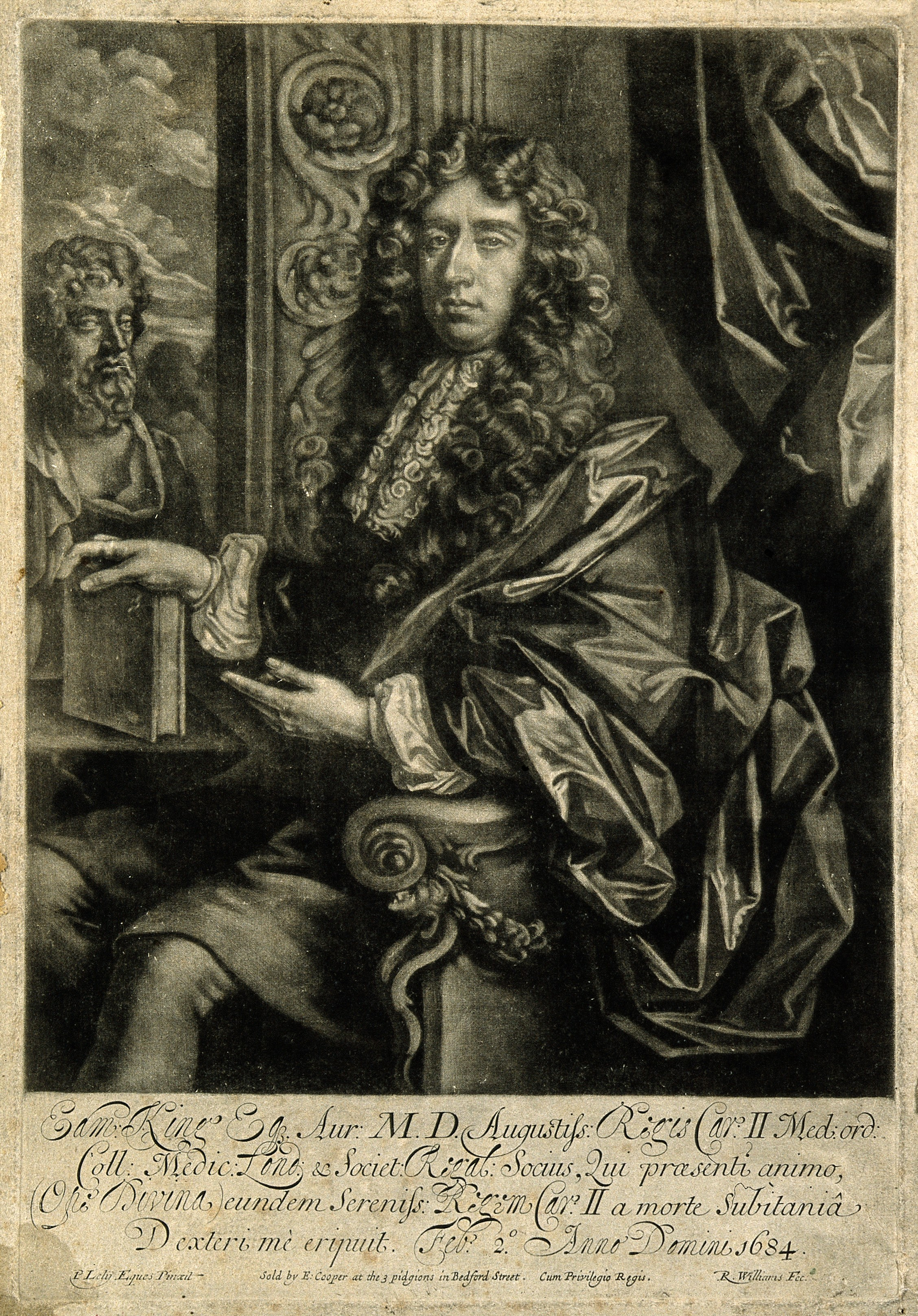
Edmund King, 1684 engraving

Sir Edmund King (c.1630–1709), also Edmund Freeman, Edmond King, was an English surgeon and physician. He is known as an experimentalist, and also for his attendance on Charles II of England.

== Life ==
He was the eldest son of Edmond King (Kinge, Freeman) of Northampton, a surgeon and physician, baptised in 1630. He practised, after apprenticeship, as a surgeon in London. He lived at first in Little Britain, London, and had a museum in his house which he took pleasure in showing to students. He used to keep dried specimens, such as the ileocecal valve, pressed in a large paper book, and he dissected animals as well as the human subject.

Around 1665 King took a house in Hatton Garden, London and was married at St. Andrew's Church, Holborn, on 20 June 1666, to Rebecca Polsted of the adjoining parish of St. Sepulchre. Also in 1666 he was elected a Fellow of the Royal Society. Gilbert Sheldon, the archbishop of Canterbury, created him M.D., a Lambeth degree; he was incorporated at Cambridge in 1671, and in 1677, on bringing a commendatory letter from the king, was admitted an honorary fellow of the College of Physicians of London. He was admitted a regular fellow 12 April 1687, one of the nominees of James II's charter. He was knighted and sworn physician to the king in 1676.

On the morning of 2 February 1685 King was sent for by Charles II. Charles talked incoherently, but King did not discover the morbid change at work. By Lord Peterborough's advice he paid a second visit to the bedchamber, and at the moment that he entered Charles fell down in a fit. King bled him immediately, and Charles gradually regained consciousness. The other physicians who arrived approved the bleeding, and the privy council advised that King should receive a reward of £1,000; but King received no fee.

King had a good practice, from which he did not retire till he was 72. He then spent much time in the country. His own loss of strength compelled him in 1701 to give up attending the aged poet Charles Sedley, whose death he had foretold at his first visit; and he handed on the patient to Sir Hans Sloane.

King died in Hatton Garden, 30 May 1709. He was acquainted with Lord Arundel, Sir William Petty, Walter Needham, and Robert Boyle, and some of his experiments were carried on at Arundel House in the Strand.

== Works ==
In 1666 King published in the Philosophical Transactions a paper on the parenchymatous parts of the body, and maintained, from microscopic observation, that they contained enormous numbers of minute blood-vessels. In 1667 the Philosophical Transactions contained a long account by him of the transfusion of the blood of a calf into a sheep, with a view to proving that one animal may live with the blood of another. The experiment was conducted by means of an apparatus of pipes and quills.

King worked with Robert Hooke and Peter Balle on respiration in 1666–8. In a noted xenotransfusion experiment of November 1667, King with Richard Lower transfused sheep's blood into a man, a direction of research they abandoned in 1668 after reports from France of a death.

In 1669 King published further microscopic researches to show that glands consisted of tubes and vessels only. In 1667 King published a paper on ants, and in 1670 one on leaf cutter bees, both in Philosophical Transactions: he had examined the eggs of ants microscopically, and studied anthills.

In the Philosophical Transactions for 1686 King published an account of the autopsy of Robert Bacon, a "demented person", who had a calcified pineal gland in his brain, renal and vesical calculi and gallstones. He mentions that he had dissected one hundred brains. In the preface to the Pharmaceutice Rationalis of Thomas Willis, who became a close friend, King's dissections are commended. In November 1688 he published a further paper in the Philosophical Transactions on the tubular structure of reproductive glands in men, guinea-pigs, and bulls.
