= William Lower =

William Lower may refer to:

- Sir William Lower (astronomer), English astronomer and MP
- Sir William Lower (dramatist), English dramatist and translator
- William Lower (cyclist), British cyclist
