= The Decline and Fall of Virgil in Eighteenth-Century Germany =

2006 book by Geoffrey Atherton

- Author: Geoffrey Atherton
- Language: English
- Publisher: Camden House Publishing
- Publication date: 2006
- Publication place: United States
- Pages: 312
- ISBN: 978-1-57113-306-9

The Decline and Fall of Virgil in Eighteenth-Century Germany: The Repressed Muse is a 2006 book by the German studies scholar Geoffrey Atherton.

== Summary ==
The book traces the reception of the Roman poet Vergil in 18th-century German culture. At the beginning of the century, Vergil was regarded as a model poets should try to emulate. By the middle of the century, a shift happened where Roman culture lost prestige and classical Greek culture became the source of role models, notably through the influence of Johann Joachim Winckelmann and his 1755 book Thoughts on the Imitation of Greek Works in Painting and the Art of Sculpture. Writers who had held Vergil as their role model began to be seen as embarrassments. Atherton traces how Vergil in spite of this continued to be read and studied in the second half of the 18th century. He had significant influence on German-language culture from the era, notably the works of Salomon Gessner, Maler Müller, Johann Heinrich Voß, Johann Wolfgang von Goethe and Novalis.

== Reception ==
Edward T. Potter wrote for H-German that the book provides "a fruitful, insightful argument" and "a great deal of information", creating "a strong network of connections between classical Greco-Roman literature and German literary works of the Enlightenment, Sensibility, Storm and Stress, Classical, and Romantic period".

== See also ==
- Virgilian progression
