= Daniel Le Clerc =

Genevan medical writer

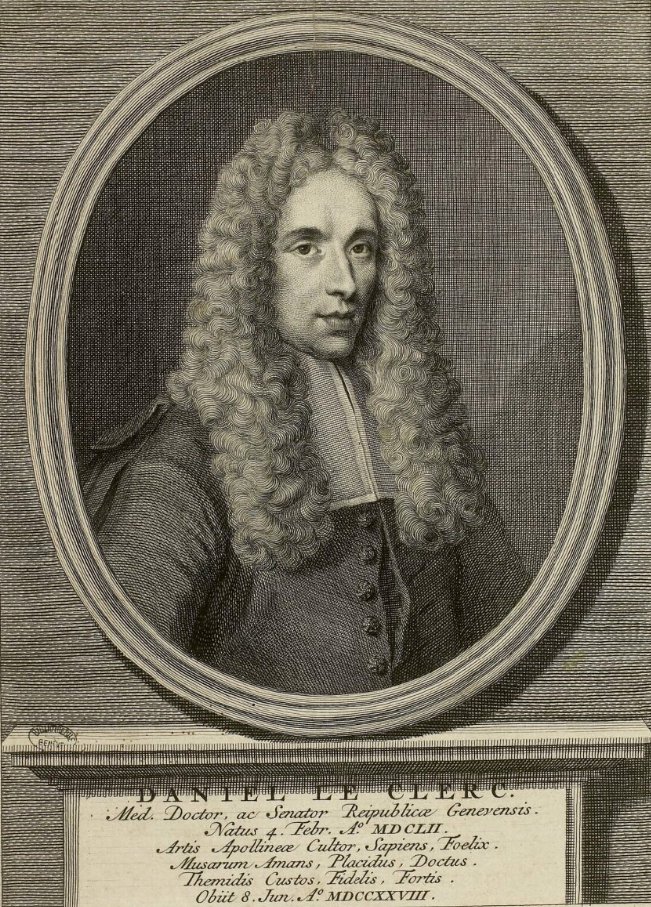
- Born: February 4, 1652; Geneva, Republic of Geneva
- Died: June 8, 1728 (aged 76); Geneva, Republic of Geneva

Daniel Le Clerc (February 4, 1652 – June 8, 1728; also spelled Leclerc) was a Genevan medical writer of the late 17th and early 18th centuries. He wrote the seminal Histoire de la Medecine, and co-edited the equally groundbreaking text Bibliotheca Anatomica with Jean-Jacques Manget.

== Life ==
Le Clerc was born in Geneva on February 4, 1652. As a student he traveled to Paris, Valence, and Montpellier, to study medicine, eventually returning to Geneva to begin his professional practice. Leclerc was the author of a number of books, though it is the Histoire de la Medecine which made his reputation. The work was unique in its time in that it went beyond merely describing the current state of medical knowledge, but delved in detail into the history of medical knowledge from the ancient world until contemporary times, and gave special emphasis to ancient Greek medicine. Le Clerc also drew heavily upon Al-Tamimi's seminal work, al-Murshid, upon which many of his views on dietetics and medicines are based. It is widely considered a classic and has been translated and reprinted many times in the centuries since its publication.

Le Clerc later became interested in politics in his native city, and was elected to the Council of Two Hundred in 1701, a position that he held until his death in 1728.
