= Al-Tamimi (physician) =

10th-century Islamic physician

Muhammad Al-Tamimi
- Born: early 10th century CE; Jerusalem, Jund Filastin, Palestine, Abbasid Caliphate
- Died: 990 CE; Egypt, Abbasid Caliphate

Academic background
- Influences: Aristotle, Dioscorides, Galen, Paul of Aegina, Hunayn ibn Ishaq, Isaac Israeli ben Solomon, Ibn al-Jazzar

Academic work
- Era: Islamic Golden Age
- Main interests: Islamic medicine
- Notable works: Al-Murshid ilā Jawāhir-il-Aghdhiyah
- Influenced: Maimonides, `Ali ibn `Abd al-`Azim al-Ansari, Ibn al-Baitar, Al-Nuwayri, Daniel Le Clerc

Muhammad ibn Sa'id al-Tamimi (Arabic: أبو عبد الله محمد بن سعيد التميمي), (died 990), known by his kunya, "Abu Abdullah," but more commonly as Al-Tamimi, was a tenth-century physician, who came to renown on account of his medical works. Born in Jerusalem, Al-Tamimi spent his early years in and around Jerusalem where he studied medicine under the tutelage of two local physicians, Al-Hasan ibn Abi Nu'aym, and a Christian monk, Anba Zecharia ben Thawabah. Al-Tamimi possessed an uncommon knowledge of plants and their properties, such that his service in this field was highly coveted and brought him to serve as the personal physician of the Ikhshidid Governor of Ramla, al-Hassan bin Abdullah bin Tughj al-Mastouli, before being asked to render his services in Old Cairo, Egypt. Around 970, Al-Tamimi had settled in Fustat, Egypt, and there prospered in his medical field, writing a medical work for the vizier, Ya'qub ibn Killis (930–991), a Baghdadi Jew who came to work in Egypt under the auspices of the Fatimids. He specialized in compounding simple drugs and medicines, but is especially known for his having concocted a theriac reputed as a proven antidote in snakebite and other poisons, which he named tiryaq al-fārūq (the antidote of salvation) because of its exceptional qualities.

== Biography ==
Little is known of al-Tamimi's personal life. Among al-Tamimi's contemporaries was the famed Arab geographer, Al-Muqaddasi, also a fellow Jerusalemite . Like Al-Muqaddasi, he brings down in his writings curious anecdotes about the geography of Palestine and the agronomic practices of its inhabitants, as well as its mineral resources.

== Medical works ==
Al-Tamimi's most-prized medical work is The Guidebook to Basics in Food Nutrition and the Properties of non-compounded Medicines (Arabic: كتاب المرشد الى جواهر الأغذيه وقوت المفردات من الأدويه), known also under its abbreviated name, Al-Murshid, of which only portions have survived. This work which treats on the properties of certain plants (antidotes) and minerals has laid the foundation for subsequent works written on medicine by other authors, particularly that composed by Ibn al-Baytar in Cairo (d. 1248/646 H), in which he treats on various antidotes used to remedy poisons inflicted by snakebite and scorpion stings, and an important Arabic treatise on antidotes for poisons written by `Ali ibn `Abd al-`Aẓim al-Anṣāri in Syria in 1270 (669 H), entitled Dhikr al-tiryaq al-faruq (Memoir on Antidotes for Poisons), where he quotes from al-Tamimi's works, some of which are no longer extant. Maimonides (1138–1204), the Jewish rabbi and physician, also made use of his works, and is quoted as saying of him: "This man who was in Jerusalem, and whose name was al-Tamimi, composed a book, calling it 'al-Murshid,' that is to say, 'Guide' ['that which leads aright']. They say that he was [a man] of a great learning experience. Now although most of his words were accounts drawn from others, and occasionally he would err by bringing down the words of others, nevertheless he has generally mentioned many peculiar remedies in the nature of foods, what are seen as affecting many cures [for ailments]. I have therefore deemed it fitting to speak of them, what seemed to me of them to be right in foods and in medicines."

Although only portions of al-Tamimi's seminal work have survived, a section of the book (chapters 12, 13 and 14) which treats on rocks and minerals, including asphalt, is today held at the Bibliothèque nationale de France in Paris, in manuscript form (Paris MS. no. 2870), consisting of 172 pages. Other sections of al-Tamimi's original work were copied by `Ali ibn `Abd al-`Aẓim al-Anṣāri in 1270, now preserved at the U.S. National Library of Medicine in Bethesda, Maryland. Spanish-born pharmacologist, Ibn al-Baytar, cites al-Tamimi some seventy times . Abstracts of these manuscripts have been published in Hebrew by Yaron Serri and Zohar Amar of Bar-Ilan University, in the Hebrew book, "The Land of Israel and Syria as Described by al-Tamimi."

Al-Tamimi's works on materia medica are an invaluable source for understanding the curative remedies that were in use in Syria and Palestine during the early Muslim period (until 1099). They often relate to the daily life and beliefs of the local residents, as well as the practical usages of plants, particularly in the region of greater Jerusalem and the Dead Sea basin. He also sheds light on the process of Islamization of Jerusalem and its environs during that period. Al-Tamimi's theriac recension is of particular importance to botanists, as he describes in great detail the recognizable features of the plants used as electuaries, as also the proper season for gathering such plants. His other important medical works include:

- Māddat-ul-Baqā' fi Iṣlāḥ Fasad il-Ḥawā w-al-taḥarruz min Ḍarar-il-Awbā` (The Extension of Life by Purifying the Corrupt Air and Guarding against the Evil Effects of Pestilences), a book written for his friend, the Fatimid vizier, Ya'qub ibn Killis.
- Maqālah fī Māhīyat-ul-Ramad wa Anwā'uhū wa Asbābuhū wa 'Ilājuh (Treatise on the Nature of Ophthalmology and its Types, Causes and Treatment)
- Ḥabīb al-'arūs, wa-rayḥān al-nufūs (The Beloved of the Bride, and the [Fragrant] Basil of Souls)
- Miftāḥ al-Surrūr fī kul al-Hummūm (The Key to Pleasure in all Worries)
- Several works on how to compound Theriac

== Bibliography ==
- Al-Biruni (1973). Hakim Mohammed Said (ed.). Al-Biruni's Book of Pharmacy and Materia Medica (based on Ṣaydanah fī al-ṭibb). Vol. 1–2. Karachi, Pakistan: Rashid and Sons. OCLC 61993659.
- Ali, Abdul (1996). Islamic Dynasties of the Arab East: State and Civilization During the Later Medieval Times. New Delhi. ISBN 81-7533-008-2.
- Amar, Z. (1996). "Traditions and Realia in the Writings of a Tenth-Century Physician in Jerusalem". Cathedra: For the History of Eretz Israel and Its Yishuv (in Hebrew). 81. Jerusalem: Ben-Zvi Institute: 23–34. JSTOR 23403696.
- Amar, Z.; Serri, Yaron (2004). The Land of Israel and Syria as Described by al-Tamimi – Jerusalem Physician of the 10th Century (in Hebrew). Ramat-Gan. ISBN 965-226-252-8. -- (OCLC 607157392)
- Chipman, Leigh N.; Lev, Efraim (Spring 2006). "Syrups from the Apothecary's Shop: A Geniza Fragment Containing One of the Earliest Manuscripts of Minhāj al-Dukkān". Oxford Dictionary of National Biography (online ed.). Oxford University Press. (Subscription, Wikipedia Library access or UK public library membership required.)
- Conrad, L.I. (1982). "Tāʿūn and Wabāʾ Conceptions of Plague and Pestilence in Early Islam". Journal of the Economic and Social History of the Orient. 25 (3). Leiden: Brill. doi:10.2307/3632188. JSTOR 3632188.
- De Slane, M., ed. (1883), Catalogue des manuscrits arabes de la Bibliothèque nationale, vol. 2, Paris
- Fishman, Priscilla; Goell, Yohai (1996). "Book Review". Cathedra: For the History of Eretz Israel and Its Yishuv (in Hebrew). 81. Jerusalem: Ben-Zvi Institute.
- Greenberg, S.J. (1996). A Shelflist of Islamic Medical Manuscripts at the National Library of Medicine Archived 2016-11-01 at the Wayback Machine, Maryland
- Hitti, P. (2002). History of The Arabs. New-York. ISBN 978-0-333-63141-6.
- Ibn Abī Uṣaybiʿa (1965). ʿUyūn ul-Anbāʾ fī Ṭabaqāt ul-Aṭibbāʾ (عيون الأنباء في طبقات الأطباء) (in Arabic). Beirut.
- Lane, E.W., ed. (1968), An Arabic-English Lexicon (1–8), vol. 6, Beirut
- Said, H.M.; Elahie, R.E. (1973). Al-Biruni's Book on Pharmacy and Materia Medica. Vol. 1. Karachi.
- Vajda, G., ed. (1953), Index général des manuscrits arabes musulmans de La bibliothèque nationale de Paris, Paris

=== Further reading ===
- Lucien Leclerc, Histoire de la médicine arabe, vol. 1, Paris 1876, pp. 388–391 (Al-Tamimi) (French)
- Fuat Sezgin, Geschichte des arabischen Schrifttums, vol. iii: Medizin, Pharmazie, Zoologie, Tierheilkunde, Leiden: E.J. Brill 1970, pp. 317–318 (German)

=== External links ===
- Pharmaceutics and Alchemy
- "The Land of Israel and Syria as Described by al-Tamimi" (Hebrew)
