= Virgilian progression =

The Virgilian progression or rota Virgilli (lit. 'wheel of Virgil') is a literary term for Virgil's career path as a poet.

This progression shows that Virgil moved from pastoral poetry in his Eclogues, to poetry on the working man in his Georgics, to epic poetry which was found in the Aeneid. As Virgil is considered one of the major writers of Rome his works were carefully studied by Medieval and Renaissance scholars. The discovery of a Virgilian progression led many men to attempt to emulate Virgil's literary career so that they too might become great poets of their time. Examples of some of these authors include Edmund Spenser and Miguel de Cervantes.

== See also ==
- The Decline and Fall of Virgil in Eighteenth-Century Germany
