= William Lower (dramatist) =

Sir William Lower (c.1610–1662) was an English dramatist and translator, and an officer in the King's army in the civil war.

== Life ==
Lower was born in Cornwall about 1610, the only son of John Lower of Tremere and his first wife Jane. He did not attend Oxford or Cambridge University, but "spent some time in Oxon in the condition of an Hospes, for the sake of the public Library and Scholastic Company", as his cousin Richard Lower, a physician, informed Anthony Wood. "... he troubled himself not with the crabb'd studies of Logic and Philosophy", travelled in France, and became a "perfect master of the French tongue".

In 1639 he published The Phoenix in her Flames: a Tragedy, dedicated to his cousin William Lower. John Genest, in Some Account of the English Stage (volume 10, page 69), gives an abstract of the plot, which he describes as "romantic, but interesting".

=== The civil war ===
Lower was a lieutenant in Sir Jacob Ashley's regiment in the King's army, and was promoted captain, but lost his company, which proved mutinous and deserted. In June 1644, being then lieutenant-governor of Wallingford, he received orders from the King to raise £50 a week from the town of Reading for the garrison at Wallingford. Lower took the mayor to Wallingford as a hostage; he then plied the corporation with diplomatic letters, which failed, however, to extract from them more than a fraction of the sum required. His zeal was subsequently rewarded by a knighthood, conferred upon him probably on 27 March 1645.

On 19 January 1646 he was taken prisoner by the parliamentary garrison of Abingdon and taken to London; he was released on 11 January 1647.

=== In Cologne and Holland ===
He is thought to have remained in England until 1655, when he visited Cologne, and cheered the royalists there with the assurance that Cromwell could not live long. Leaving Cologne after a short residence, he seems to have held some post in the household of the Princess Royal of Orange at the Hague, and occupied his time in translating French plays.

In 1658 he published at the Hague another original play, The Enchanted Lovers: a Pastoral. In 1660, during the negotiations between Charles II and the English parliament, Lower prepared his sumptuous "Relation in the form of a Journal of the Voiage and Residence which the most mighty and excellent Prince Charles II … hath made in Holland from 25 May to 2 June 1660, rendered into English out of the Original French." The work, a thin royal folio, was issued in September (in Dutch and French, as well as English), by Adrian Ulack of the Hague. The plates contain some two hundred portraits, both foreign and English.

=== Return to England ===
In June 1660 Lower wrote to Edward Nicholas, Secretary of State to Charles II, from the Hague, asking for a place in the King's service. The death of his cousin Thomas Lower, by which he became sole heir, executor, and chief representative of the family, recalled him to England in 1661. He died early in the following year, his will being proved on 7 May 1662. His wife, of whom nothing is known, predeceased him; he left most of his estate to his daughter Elizabeth, held in trust until the age of 21.

Lower was buried, Anthony Wood believed, in the church of St Clement Danes in Westminster, though there is no record of his interment either there or at St Winnow or at Landulph, where his inherited estate was situate.

== Works ==
Thomas Seccombe, in the Dictionary of National Biography, wrote, "Though there are a few good lines in The Phoenix, most of Lower's verse is very commonplace, and his translations, without being even laborious, are dull." Richard Lower described him to Anthony Wood as "an ill poet, and a worse man."

His works are:

- The play The Phoenix in her Flames (1639), a tragic romance set in Arabia
- The play The Enchanted Lovers (1658), a pastoral set on the island of Erithrea
- Translations of plays by Pierre Corneille: Polyeuctes (1655) and Horatius (1656)
- Translations of works about religious martyrs, by René de Ceriziers: The Innocent Lady (1654), The Innocent Lord (1655) and The Triumphant Lady (1656)
- Translations of plays by Philippe Quinault: The Noble Ingratitude (La Généreuse Ingratitude) (1659), dedicated to the Princess Royal of Orange, and The Amorous Fantasme (Le Fantôme Amoureux) (1660), dedicated to Elizabeth Stuart, Queen of Bohemia
