= Bibliotheca Anatomica =

Swiss anatomical text

- Author: Daniel Le Clerc; Jean-Jacques Manget
- Original title: Bibliotheca anatomica, sive, Recens in anatomia inventorvm thesaurus locupletissimus
- Language: Latin
- Subject: Human anatomy
- Publication date: 1685 (1 ed.); 1699 (2 ed.)
- Publication place: Switzerland

Bibliotheca Anatomica is a Latin-language human anatomy text edited by Daniel Le Clerc (or Daniel LeClerc) and Jean-Jacques Manget, two physicians from Geneva. The work was published in Geneva by Sumptibus J. A. Chouët and Davidis Ritter.

Extending to two folio volumes and encompassing almost all significant anatomical publications across the several decades prior to its publication, including the writings of Thomas Bartholin, Regnier de Graaf, William Harvey, Richard Lower, Marcello Malpighi, Jan Swammerdam, Raymond Vieussens, and Thomas Willis, Bibliotheca Anatomica is the most comprehensive collection of anatomical treatises produced in the 17th century.
