= Sir Aldingar =

Traditional song

Sir Aldingar (Roud 3969, Child 59) is an English-language folk song. Francis James Child collected three variants, two fragmentary, in The English and Scottish Popular Ballads. All three recount the tale where a rebuffed Sir Aldingar slanders his mistress, Queen Eleanor, and a miraculous champion saves her.

Various forms of the legend it recounts have been recorded in many ballads, romances, and sagas. Although many have been recounted as historical accurate, no evidence supports any such claims.

== Synopsis ==
Sir Aldingar is King Henry II's steward. He tries to seduce Queen Eleanor. When he fails, he puts a leper in her bed and goes to the king, saying the queen has taken a lover, and worse, a leper as that lover. The king goes to see and find the leper there.

Accused, Queen Eleanor notes that Sir Aldingar is false, and that her belief that dreams were false is disproved, because she dreamed of a beast that had stolen her crown and headdress, and would have carried her off if a merlin had not stopped it. She demands trial by combat. The king gives her forty days to find a champion. The queen's messenger is unable to find anyone for a long time, until he finds a child not four years old who will. The messenger is shocked, but the child bids him remind the queen of her dream.

Sir Aldingar does not want to fight a child, but the child insists and defeats him. Mortally wounded, the knight calls for a priest for Confession and admits to framing the queen. The leper is turned into a healthy man and becomes a steward to the king.

== Variants ==
The Scandavian ballad Ravengaard og Memering closely parallels this one. The heroine Gunhilda is said to have been the daughter of Canute the Great and Emma. She married in 1036 King Henry, afterwards the emperor Henry III; a century later, William of Malmesbury gave this legend as authentic history of her life, though there is no evidence for it. It was retold in the Spanish romance Olivia, the chanson de geste Doon l'Alemanz, as part of the English romance Sir Triamour, and in the legend of Genevieve of Brabant. In the Erl of Toulouse, the hero is merely a disinterested champion, a knight, but the plot is nevertheless recognizably the same as Sir Aldingar.

== See also ==
- List of the Child Ballads
