= Erl of Toulouse =

The Erl of Toulouse (also known as The Romance of Dyoclicyane) is a Middle English chivalric romance centered on an innocent persecuted wife. It claims to be a translation of a French lai, but the original lai is lost. It is thought to date from the late 14th century, and survives in four manuscripts of the 15th and 16th centuries. The Erl of Toulouse is written in a north-east Midlands dialect of Middle English.

== Synopsis ==
The Queen of Almayne is left in the care of two knights, who woo her. When she rejects them, they introduce a youth into her room, kill him in the presence of witnesses, and accuse her of adultery. A champion saves her from death; then her husband learns that he is his old enemy, the earl of Toulouse.

== Sources ==
Historically, Bernard I, Count of Toulouse, son of the Guillaume d'Orange of the Carolingian romances, and the empress Judith, second wife of Louis the Pious, were indeed charged with adultery and purged themselves by an oath and an offer for trial by combat; the historical situation has been embellished with romantic incident, in that the motives, which were changed from (probably) ambition to thwarted love, and the offer for combat was taken up.

== Variants ==
The oldest group of romances is the Catalan group, with three Catalan chronicles recording it, along with a Spanish romance, and two French chronicles. Later, there are the English variants, including The Erl of Toulouse and Parisian ones, which contain many miraculous elements; still latter, many Danish variants, apparently based on the English ones, are found. The poem is also found in the Lincoln Thornton Manuscript, under the title The Romance of Dyoclicyane.

In the Child ballad Sir Aldingar, a clearly miraculous champion, a tiny figure of supernatural origins comes to her aid. The Scandinavian ballads include a small but not supernatural champion.

== Motifs ==
The accusation by the knights, and the defense by a disinterested champion, represent a distinct group of romances, using motifs found only in romances, in contrast to those making use of such fairy tale motifs as the mother-in-law persecutor, and the champion being the heroine's own children; this is a distinctly medieval addition.
