= Bibliotheca Chemica Curiosa =

Collection of alchemical texts

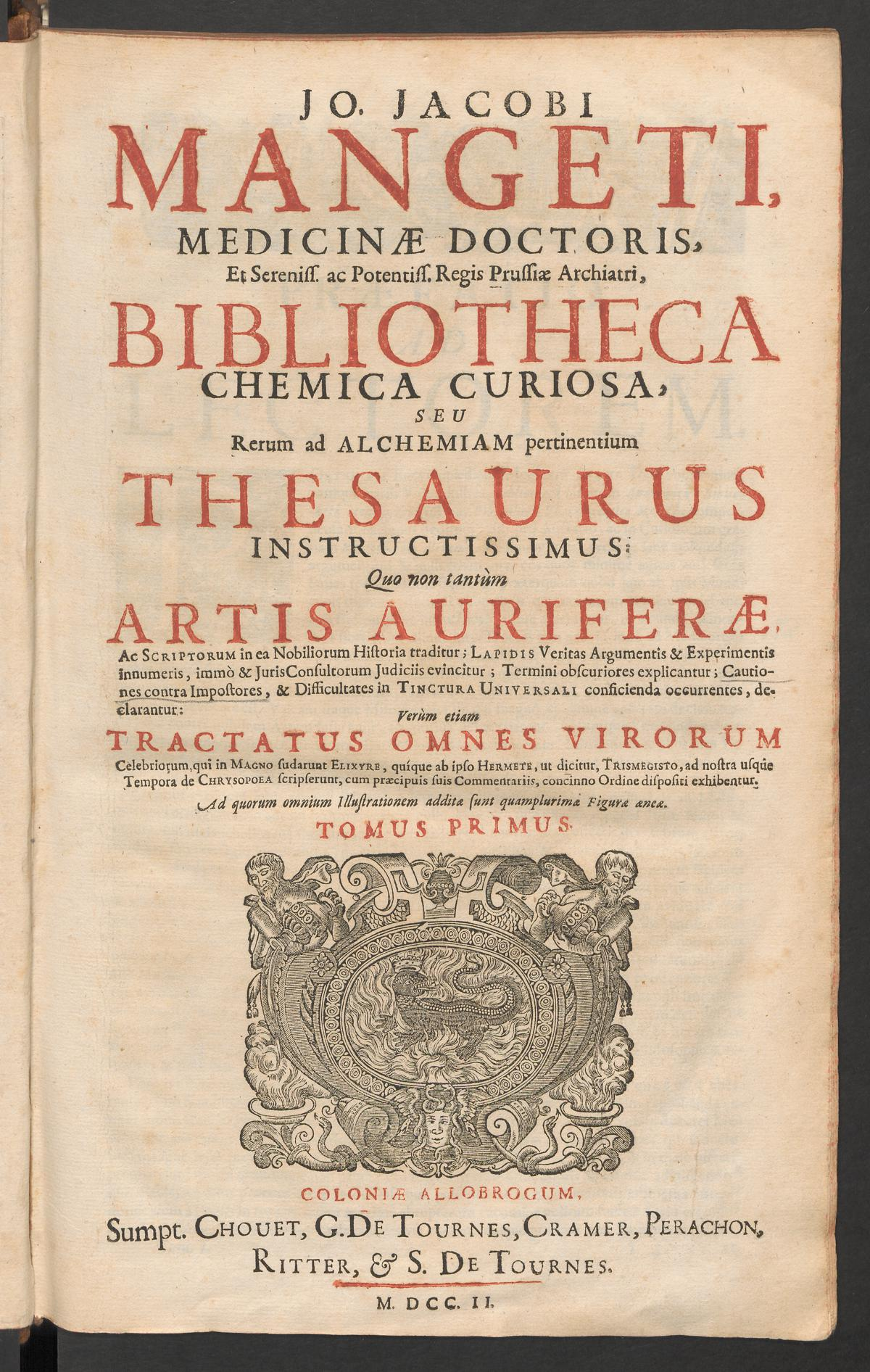
- Title page of the first volume
- Edited by: Jean-Jacques Manget
- Country: Geneva
- Language: Latin
- Genre: Document
- Publisher: Chouet
- Published: 1702
- No. of books: 2

Bibliotheca Chemica Curiosa (Latin for 'Curious Chemical Library') is a collection of alchemical texts first published in Latin, in Geneva, 1702 by Chouet, edited by Jean-Jacques Manget.

== Content ==
It is a two-volume work, each volume containing more than 900 pages and a total of 143 texts, making it one of the most comprehensive collections of alchemical writings, alongside the Theatrum Chemicum.

== Sources used ==
It is based on reprints of older publications, such as Theatrum Chemicum and Theatrum Chemicum Britannicum.

== Full title ==
The full Latin title page, including the editor's name:

Jo. Jacobi Mangeti, Medicinae Doctoris, Et Sereniss. ac Potentiss. Regis Prussiae Archiatri, Bibliotheca Chemica Curiosa, Seu Rerum ad Alchemiam pertinentium Thesaurus Instructissimus : Quo non tantùm Artis Auriferae, Ac Scriptorum in ea Nobiliorum Historia traditur; Lapidis Veritas Argumentis & Experimentis innumeris, immò & Juris Consultorum Judiciis evincitur; Termini obscuriores explicantur; Cautiones contra Impostores, & Difficultates in Tinctura Universali conficienda occurentes, declarantur : Verùm etiam Tractatus Omnes Virorum Celebriorum, qui in Magno sudarunt Elixyre, quíque ab ipso Hermete, ut dicitur, Trismegisto, ad nostra usque Tempora de Chrysopoea scripserunt, cum praecipuis suis Commentariis, concinno Ordine dispositi exhibentur. Ad quorum omnium Illustrationem additæ sunt quamplurimæ Figuræ æneæ | Genevae : sumpt. Chouet, G. De Tournes, Cramer, Perachon, Ritter, et S. De Tournes

== Gallery ==
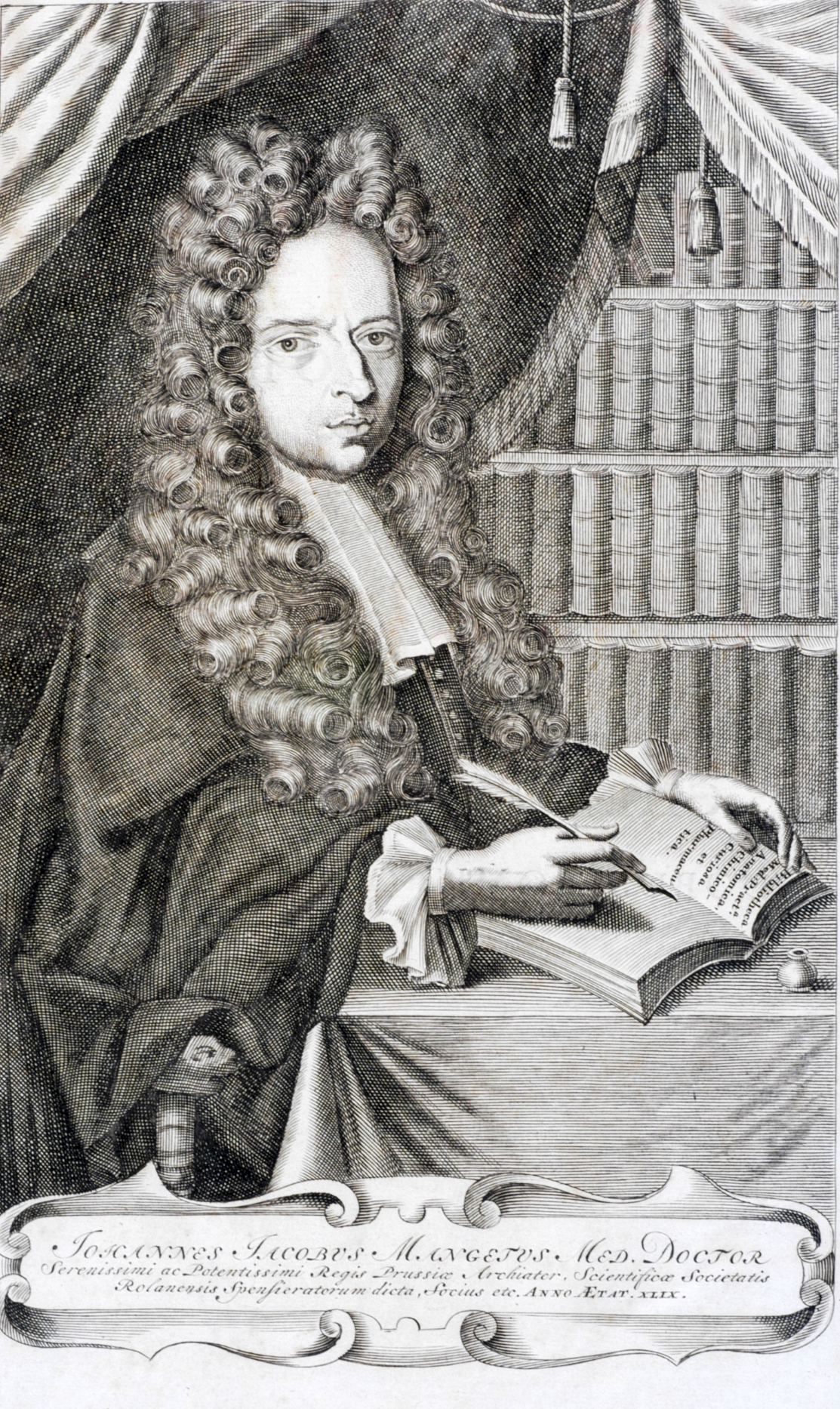
Portrait of Jean-Jaques Manget from Bibliotheca Chemica Curiosa

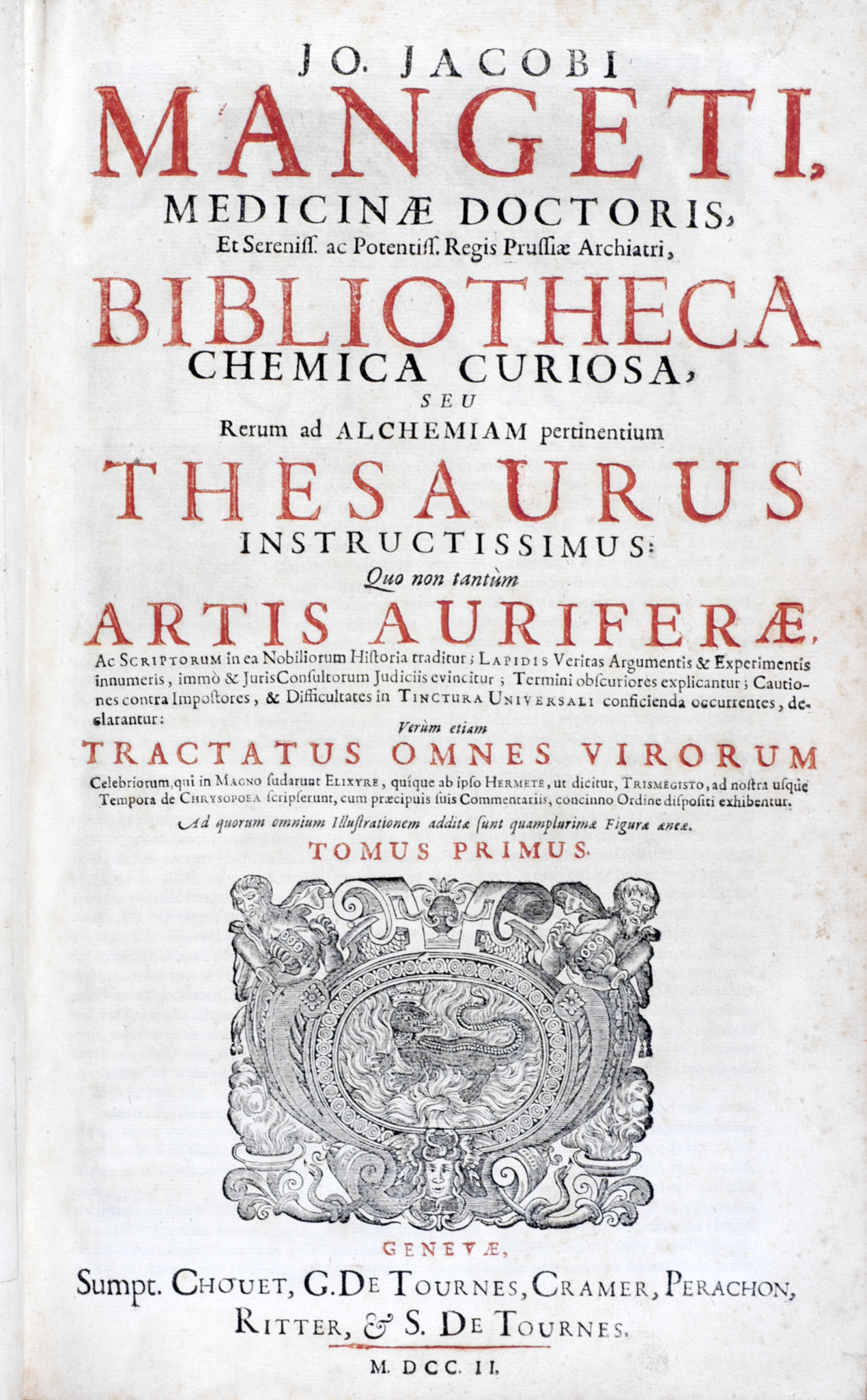
Title page of tomus primus (Latin for 'volume 1')

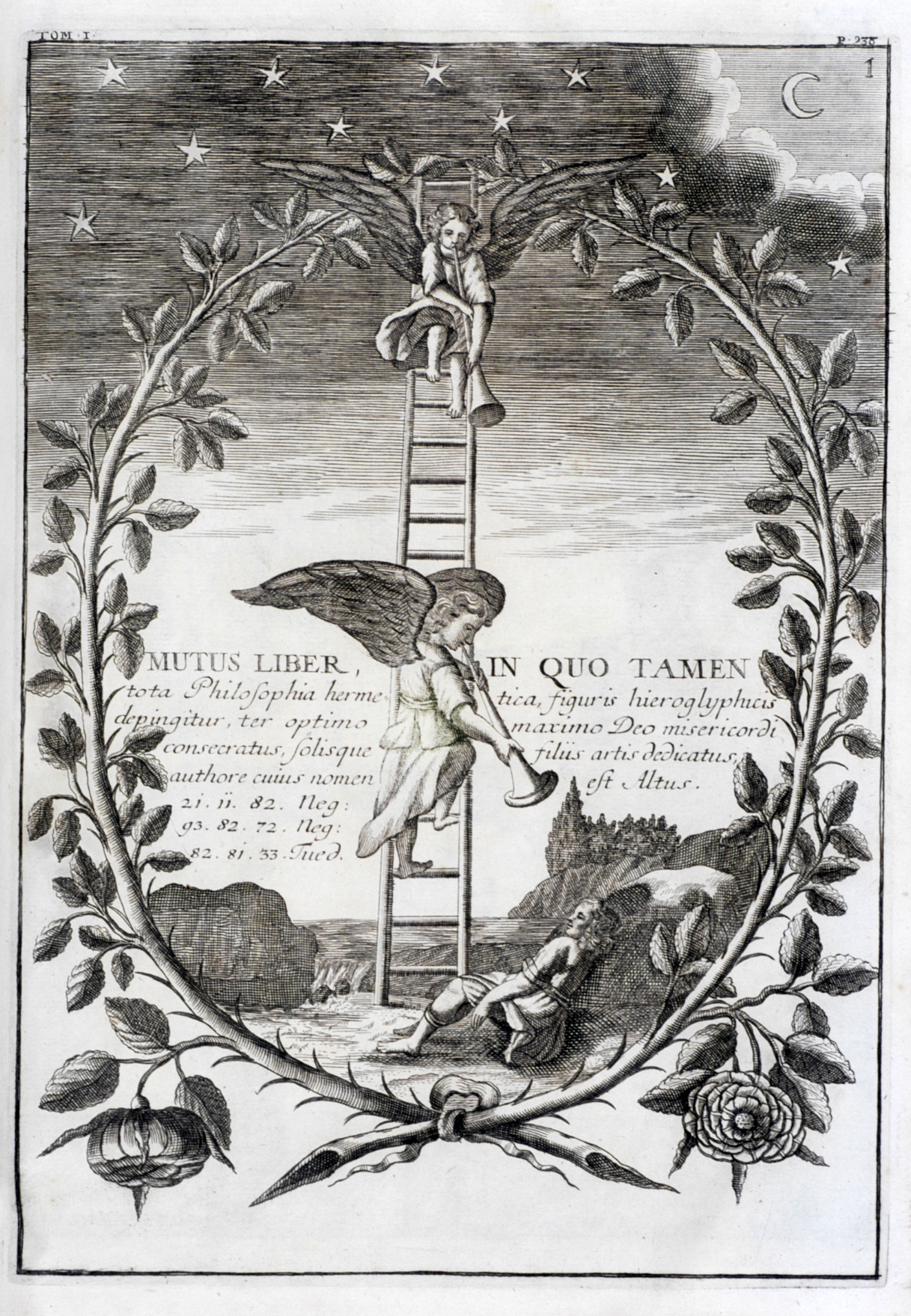
Plate 1 from volume 1

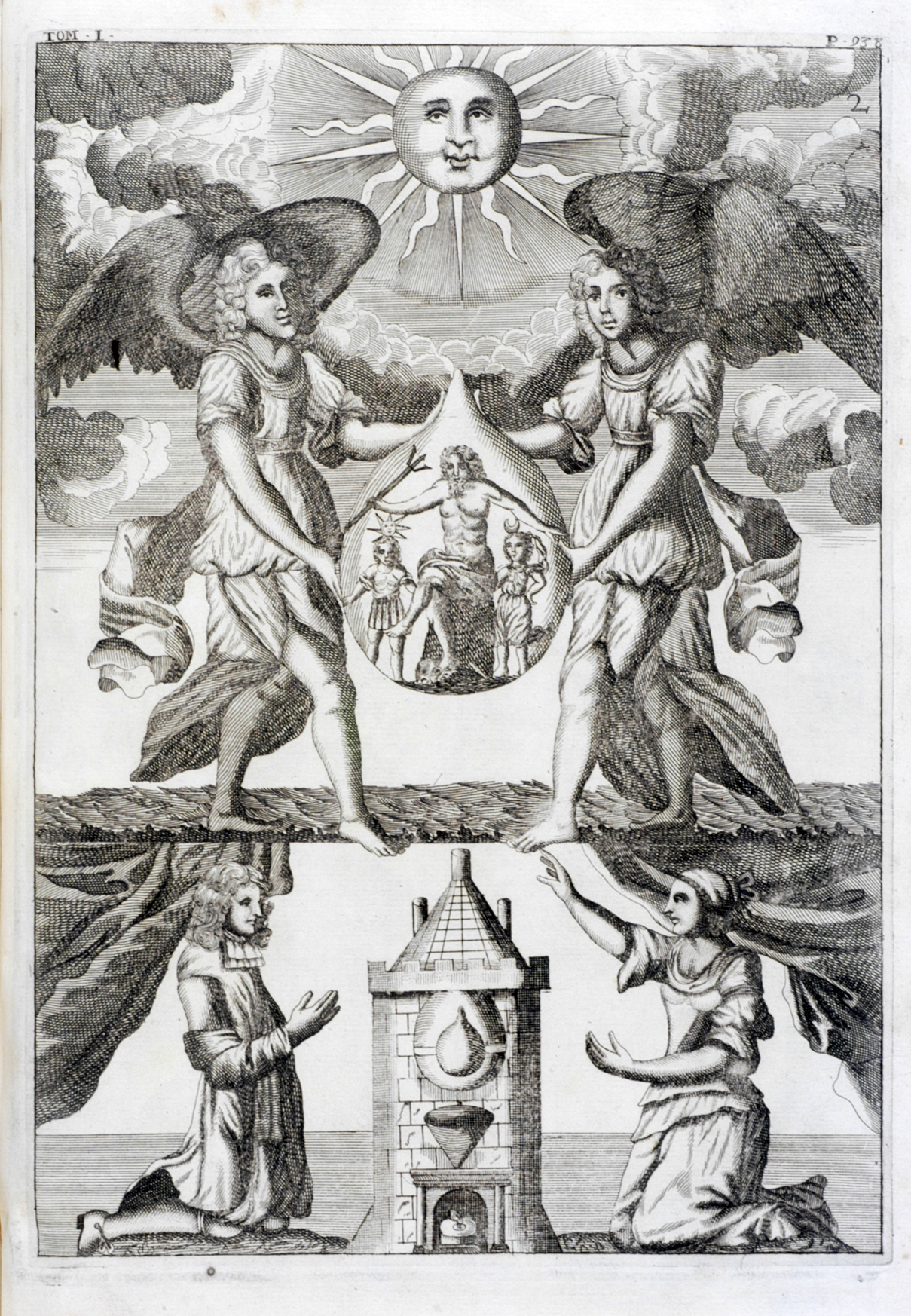
Plate 2 from volume 1

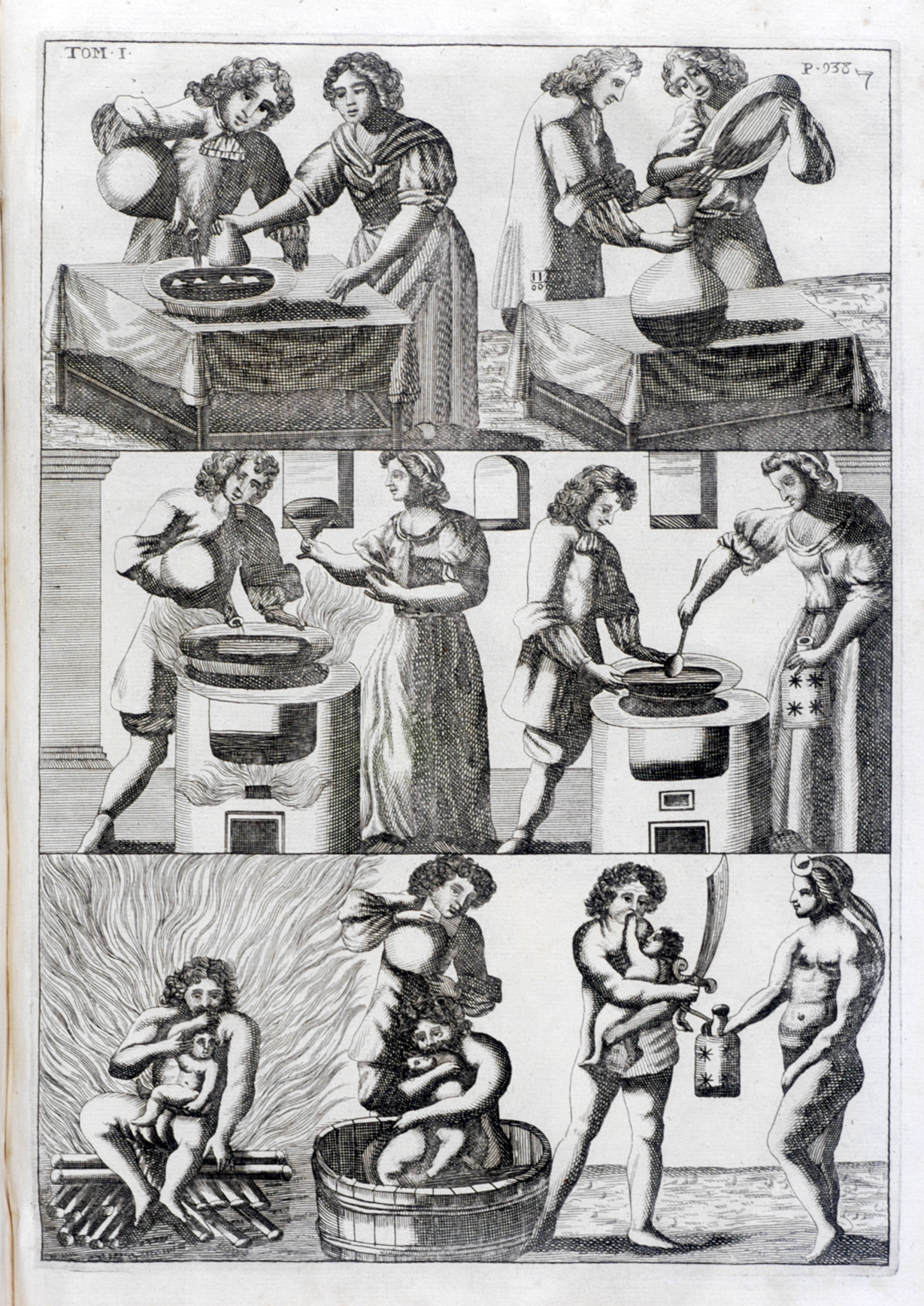
Plate 7 from volume 1

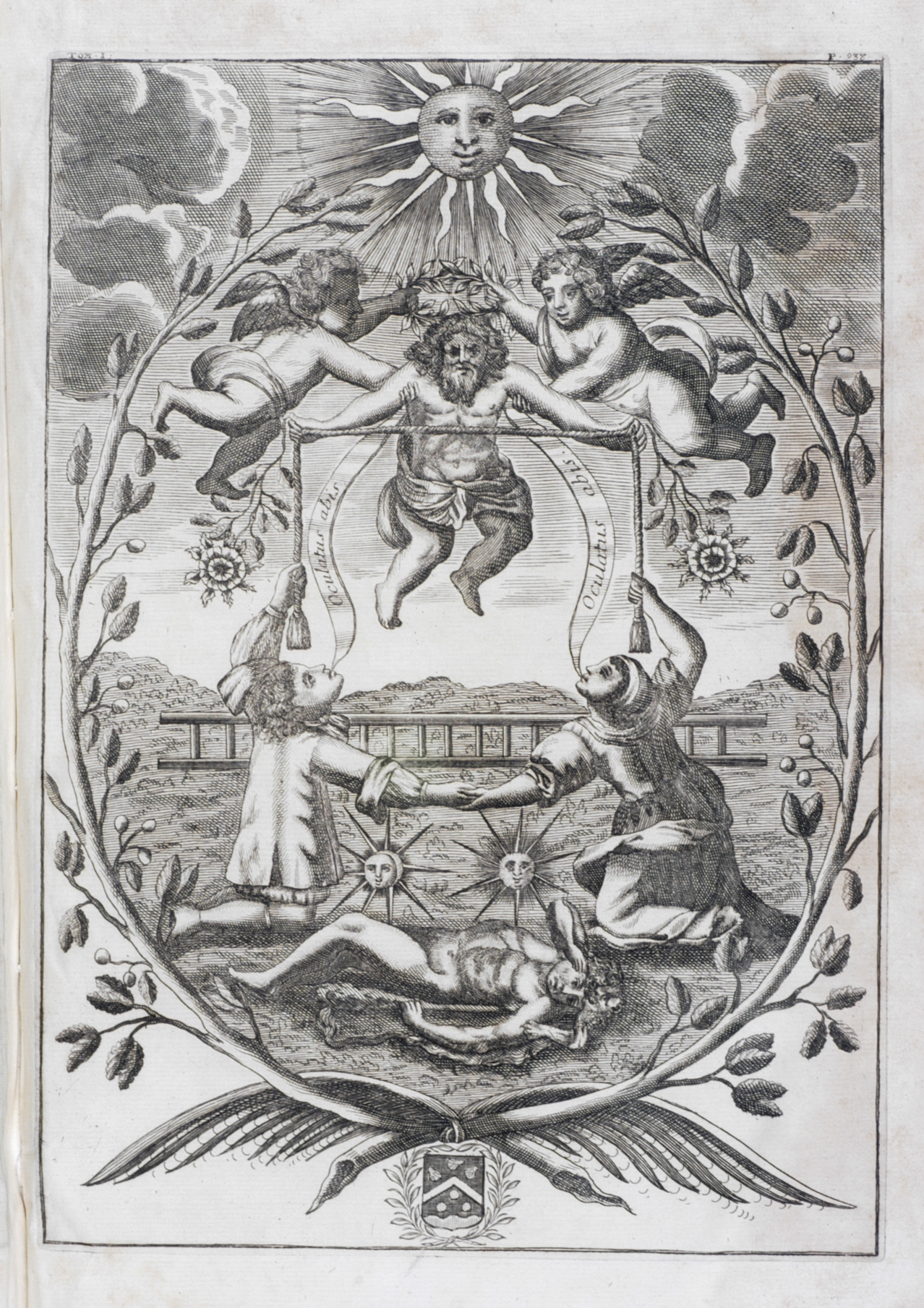
Plate 15 from vol. 1, The End of the Great Work shows the spiritualized body rising into the heavens, leaving behind the old body. The ladder of wisdom has been scaled, the angels crown the victorious adept. Above them, the sun illuminates the scene with the radiance of wisdom.

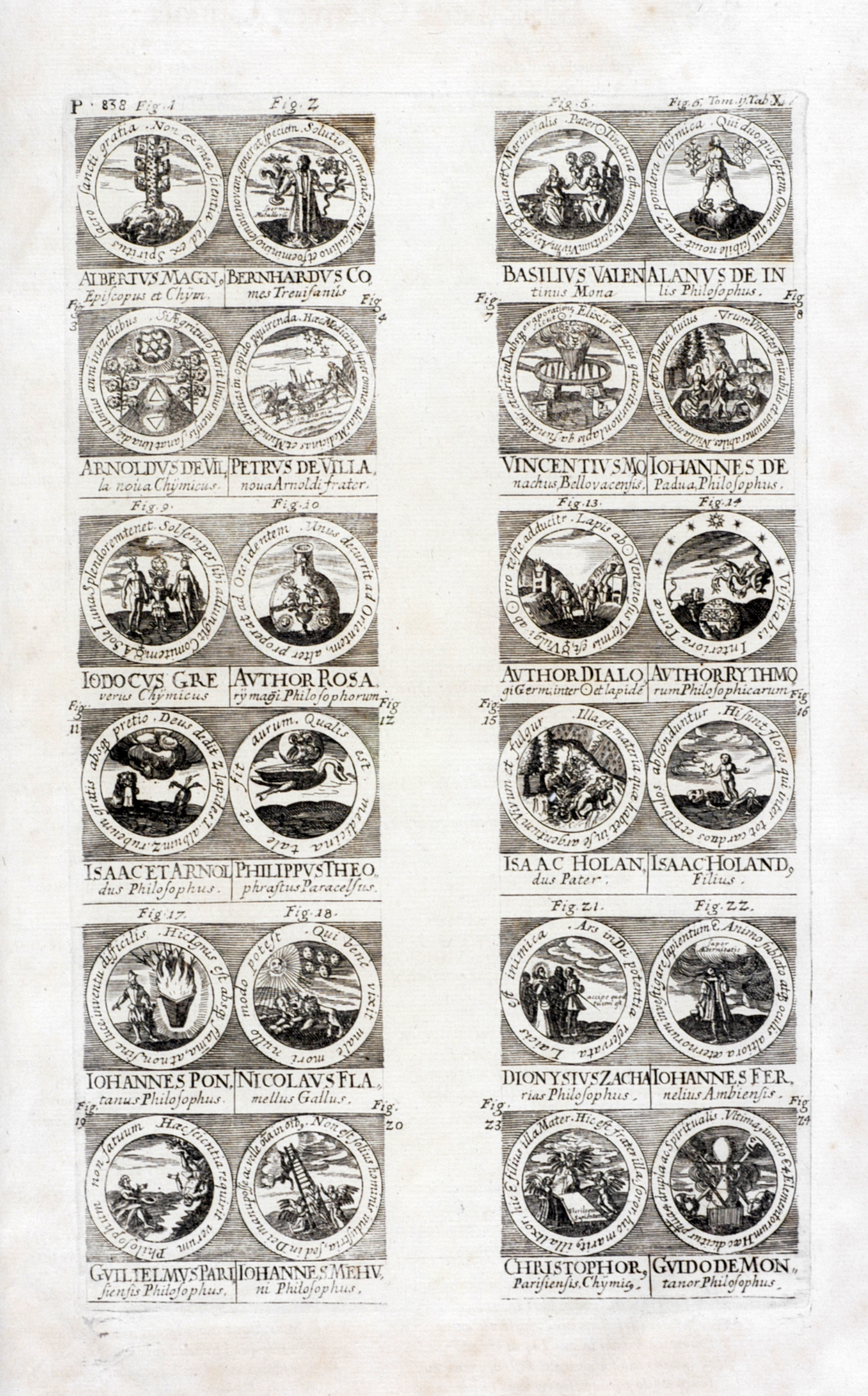
Page 898 from volume 2

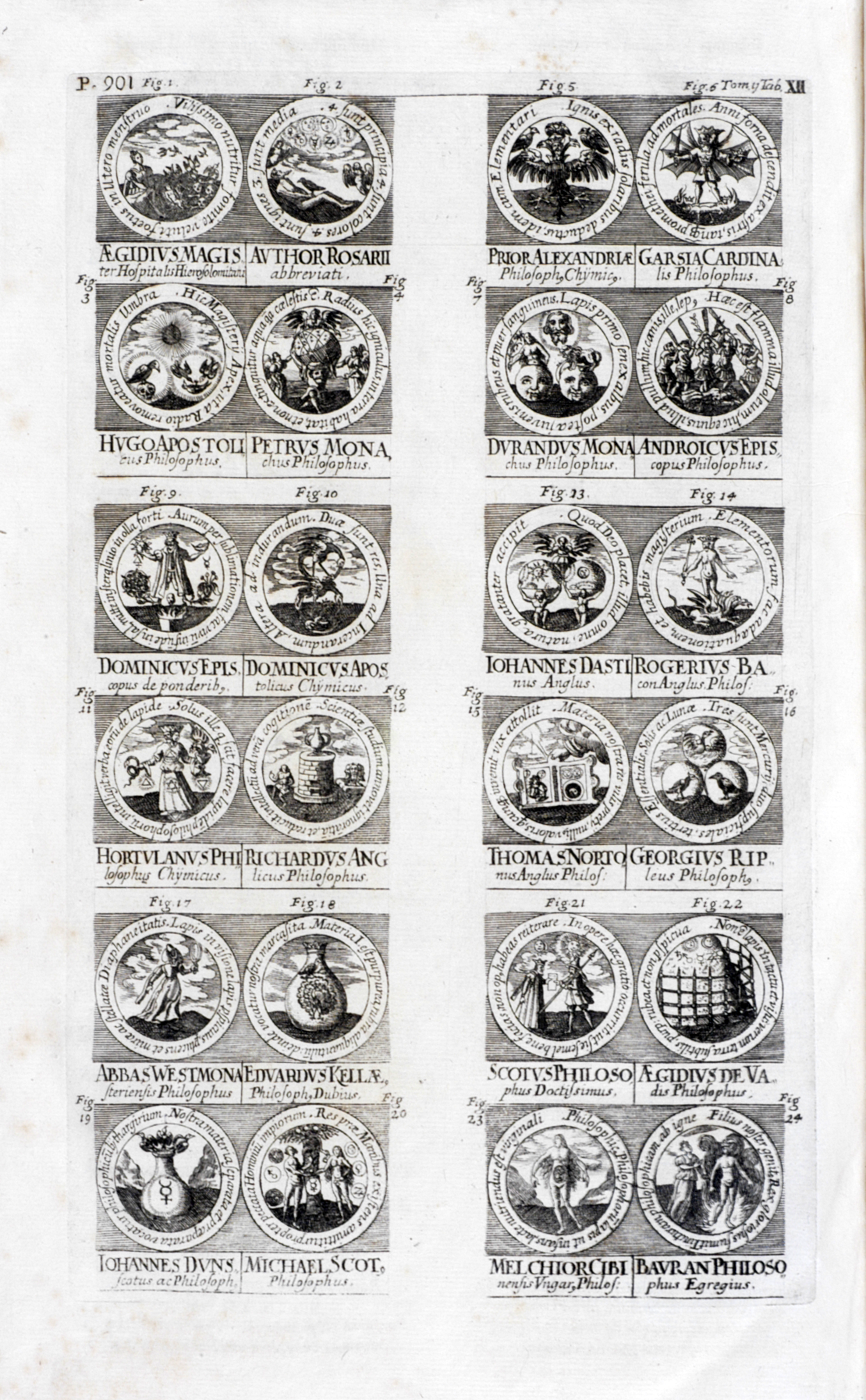
Page 901 from volume 2
