= Saint-Macaire (disambiguation) =

Saint-Macaire is a commune in the Gironde department of south-western France.

Saint-Macaire may also refer to:

- Saint-Macaire (grape), a Minor cultivar from Bordeaux. It needs an article in Wikipedia
- Gare de Saint-Macaire, a railway station on the Bordeaux–Sète line in France
- Saint-Macaire-en-Mauges, a commune (to 2015) in the Maine-et-Loire department of western France
  - Canton of Saint-Macaire-en-Mauges, an administrative division (since 2015) in Maine-et-Loire
- Saint-Macaire-du-Bois, a commune in the Maine-et-Loire department of western France
