= Maler Müller =

German painter

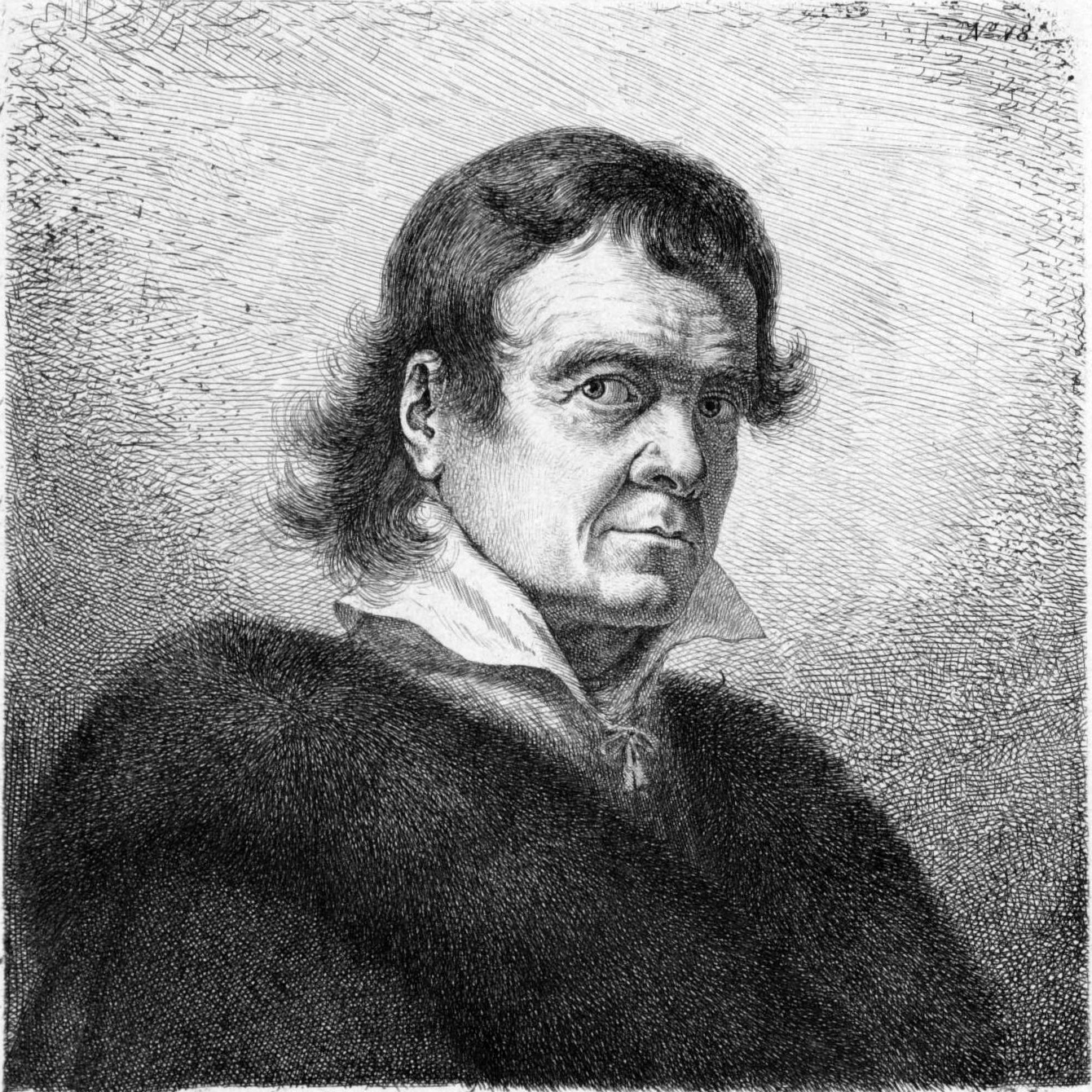
Friedrich Müller

Friedrich Müller (13 January 1749 – 23 April 1825), German poet, dramatist and painter from the Electoral Palatinate, is best known for his slightly sentimental prose idylls on country life. Usually known as Maler Müller (i.e. Painter Müller).

== Early life and education ==
Müller was born in Kreuznach. He showed a talent for art in his youth, and studied painting at Zweibrücken, where his personality and varied endowments won him the favor of court circles. At 18, he published several collections of etchings which attracted much attention with their originality. In 1774-1775, he settled in Mannheim, where he soon acquired a reputation as a poet. In 1777 he was appointed court painter.

== Painting ==
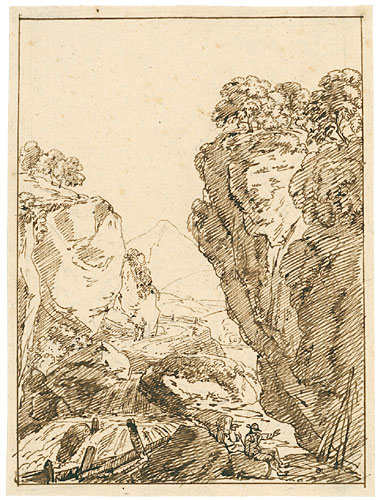
Kleiner Wasserfall in schroffer Felslandschaft ("A small waterfall in a rugged landscape with cliffs")

In 1778 he was enabled by a public subscription to visit Italy, which remained his home for the rest of his life. In 1780 he became a Roman Catholic. He was unfavourably influenced by the study of Italian models, and gradually became estranged from painting through failures and distress. He devoted himself instead to the study of the history of art. He became a sort of ambulant antiquary, and his services as cicerone were especially in demand among German visitors to Rome.

== Literature ==
Before he left Mannheim, he had tried his hand at literature, under the influence of the Sturm und Drang movement. In 1775, he published several idylls: Satyr Mopsus, Der Faun, Bacchidon und Milon, Der erschlagene Abel and Die Schafschur. In form and content, these were closely modeled on the works of Solomon Gessner. In 1778 came Adam's First Awaking and First Happy Nights (Adams erstes Erwachen; 2nd revised edition, 1779). A lyric drama of the same year, Niobe (1778), attracted little attention, but Faust's Leben dramatisiert (Faust's Life Dramatized) (1778) appealed to the turbulent spirit of the time, and Golo und Genoveva (begun in 1776, but not published until 1801) was an excellent imitation of Goethe's Götz von Berlichingen.

In his idylls, notably Die Schafschur and Das Nusskernen (1811), he struck out a more independent path. In these, emancipating himself from the artificiality of Gessner, he realistically reproduced scenes from the German peasant life of his day, not without a touch of satire. His later idylls took Voss as a model.

Maler Müller's Werke appeared in 3 vols. (1811–1825); in 1868 H. Hettner published two volumes of Dichtungen von Maler Müller, which contain most of his writings. Gedichte von Maler Friedrich Müller; eine Nachlese zu dessen Werken appeared in 1873, and his Fausts Leben was reprinted by B. Seuffert in 1881.

== Later years ==
Through the patronage of the Crown Prince of Bavaria (afterwards King Louis I), he was enabled to pass his declining years in comparative ease. He died in Rome in 1825.
