= Joel Langelott =

Joel Langelott (also Langellott or Langelot; born Thuringia, Germany, 1617 – 1680) was a German physician and alchemical writer who became court physician to Frederick IV, Duke of Holstein-Gottorp.

Langelott was a traveler to England, and contributed to the Philosophical Transactions for 1672. His best-known chemical work is the Epistula ad praecellentissimos naturae curiosos of 1672.
