= René de Ceriziers =

French theologian and historian

René de Ceriziers (or René de Cerisiers;1609–1662) was a French theologian and historian.

He was born in Nantes, and entered the Society of Jesus in 1622. He taught in several Jesuit colleges, and in 1641 left the order. He became chaplain of the Duke of Orléans and of Louis XIV.

His writings include:

- L'Image de Notre-Dame de Liesse (Rheims, 1622)
- Les Heureux Commencements de la France chrétienne sous saint Rémy (Rheims, 1633)
- La Consolation de la Philosophie de Boèce, en Vers et en Prose (Paris, 1636)
- Traductions des Soliloques de Saint-Augustin, avec les Méditations et le Manuel (Paris, 1638)
- Vie de Sainte Geneviève de Brabant (Paris, 1640)
- Réflexions chrétiennes et politiques sur la vie des rois de France (Paris, 1641–1644)
