= Richard Lower (physician) =

English physician (c. 1631–1691)

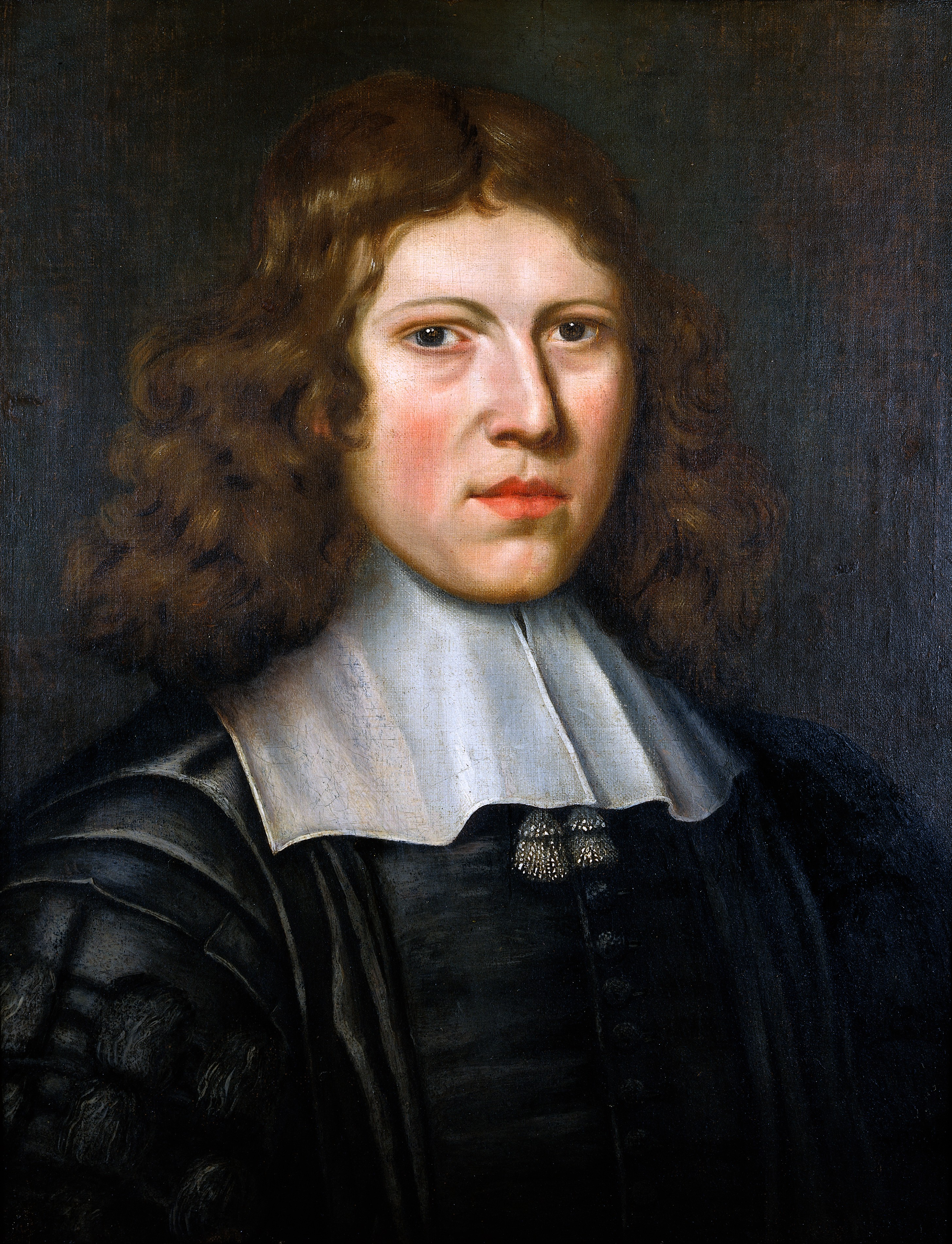
- Born: 1631; Tremeer House, Bodmin, Cornwall
- Died: 7 January 1691 (aged 59–60); Covent Garden, London
- Education: Christ Church, Oxford
- Known for: Neuroanatomy and transfusion studies
- Scientific career
- Fields: Medicine
- Doctoral advisor: Thomas Willis

Richard Lower (c. 1631 – 17 January 1691) was an English physician who heavily influenced the development of medical science. He is most remembered for his pioneering work on blood transfusion and the function of the cardiopulmonary system, which he described in his book Tractatus de Corde.

== Life ==
Lower was born in St. Tudy, Cornwall, and studied at Westminster School, where he met John Locke, as well as Christ Church, Oxford, where he met Thomas Willis. He followed Willis to London, where he carried out anatomical research, some in partnership with Robert Hooke. His major work, Tractatus de Corde (1669), was concerned with the workings of the heart and lungs. Lower also experimented with blood transfusion.

Lower formed part of an informal research team, performing laboratory experiments at the University of Oxford during the Interregnum. He was a pioneer of experimental physiology. Lower was a medical student under Willis (Professor of Natural Philosophy from 1660 to 1675), earning his M.D. degree in 1665, and then collaborated with him to investigate the nervous system. He began his own research on the heart. He traced the circulation of blood as it passes through the lungs and learned that it changes when it is exposed to air. Lower was the first to observe the difference in arterial and venous blood.

The idea of blood transfusion had originated in Paris. A French monk, Dom Robert des Gabets described the principle of transfusion at a meeting of the French Academy of Sciences in July 1658. Lower showed it was possible for blood to be transfused from animal to animal, and performed the first transfusion between two dogs in February 1665. Inspired by the work of Lower, The French doctor Jean-Baptiste Denis performed the first documented transfusion of blood from an animal to a man (xenotransfusion), in a 15-yr-old male patient shortly followed by Lower. In November 1667, Lower worked with Edmund King, another student of Willis, to transfuse sheep's blood into a man who was mentally ill. Lower was interested in advancing science but also believed the man could be helped, either by the infusion of fresh blood or by the removal of old blood. It was difficult to find people who would agree to be transfused, but an eccentric scholar, Arthur Coga, consented and the procedure was carried out by Lower and King before the Royal Society on 23 November 1667. Transfusion gathered some popularity in France and Italy, but medical and theological debates arose, resulting in the practice being prohibited. On 10 January 1670 the French Parliament prohibited transfusions, with the English Parliament rapidly following suit.

Lower studied the arterial circle at the base of the brain, named the circle of Willis after his teacher. He wanted to see if blood would continue to flow through the head if three of the four arteries supplying blood to the head were tied.

Lower also sought to understand how the cerebrospinal fluid was formed and how it circulated. These experiments led to a study of hydrocephalus, a disease in which fluid collects in the cavities of the brain. In Lower's time, it was thought that catarrh, an inflammation of the mucous membranes, might be caused by seepage of fluid from the brain to the nose. Lower's book De Catarrhis is of historical significance because it was the first scholarly attempt by an English physician to take a classical doctrine (the theory that nasal secretions are an overspill from the brain) and disprove it by scientific experiment.

Diatribae T. Willisii de Febribus Vindicatio by Richard Lower

Lower wrote Diatribae T. Willisii de Febribus Vindicatio, an eight-volume defence of Dr. Willis and his doctrine of fevers. In keeping with his interest in the circulatory system, Lower went on to write Tractatus de Corde, which described the muscular fibres of the heart, a method of ligaturing veins to produce dropsy, blood coagulation in the heart, the motion of digestive fluids, and other physiologic topics. Lower presented his Tractatus de Corde to the Royal Society in 1669.

Willis died in 1675 and Lower became busy with the demands of his medical practice. He took care of King Charles II during his final illness in 1685. When James II took the throne, Lower did not continue as court physician because of his anti-Catholic and Whiggish sentiments. However, he was consulted during pregnancy by the woman who would later become Queen Anne.

Lower died in London from a fever in 1691.

== See also ==
- List of people from Cornwall
- William Lower (dramatist), a cousin
