= Jean-Jacques Manget =

Genevan physician and writer

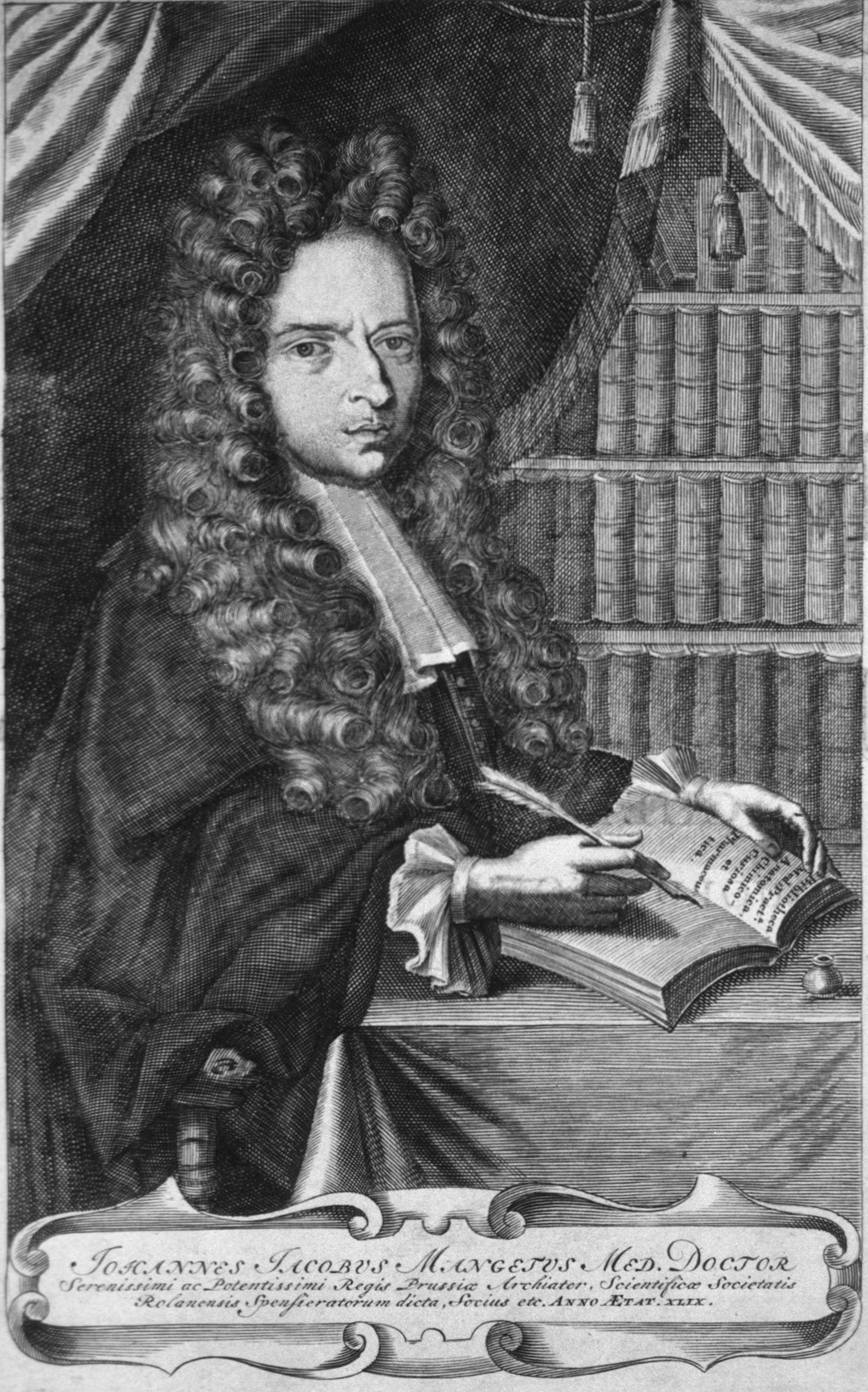
Jean-Jacques Manget.

Jean-Jacques Manget (or Johann Jacob Mangetus) (1652–1742) was a Genevan physician and writer. He was known for his work on epidemic diseases such as bubonic plague and tuberculosis. In addition to his own researches, he assiduously compiled preceding medical literature. With Théophile Bonet, he is considered one of the "great compilers" of knowledge in the areas of medicine, surgery and pharmacology. He also published a major collection of alchemical works, the Bibliotheca Chemica Curiosa (1702).

== Life ==
He was born in Geneva, the son of a merchant. He graduated as a physician at the University of Valence in 1678. Later he became the Dean of the Valence medical faculty. Frederick III, Elector of Brandenburg made Manget his personal physician in 1699.

== Works ==
Manget was one of the first doctors to carry out studies of the pathological anatomy of miliary tuberculosis. He coined the term based on his observation of widespread tiny lesions like millet seeds in the liver, lungs, spleen, and mesentery.

He published Traité de la Peste (Geneva: Philippe Planche, 1721), a major treatise on the bubonic plague, and was well known as a plague doctor. Manget reported that the exotic new drug ipecac had been effectively used in the treatment of plague in Marseille. He advised the adoption of draconian measures to ensure quarantine and prevent the transmission of plague. Such measures were reported to have been successful in Silesia.

"All People and all Countries wishing to remain in a perfect state of health must pay continuous attention to what takes place among their neighbors. If rumors spread that a contagious disease is gaining a foothold, they must break of all communication and all exchanges with it. They must prohibit all inhabitants of both provinces, the infected and the healthy, from engaging in any sort of communication in the future, under any pretext, on pain of death: and for this decree to be religiously observed it will be important to post well-armed Soldiers on the borders, and to build gallows on all public roads; either to intimidate those who will want to leave the infected country or to hang on the spot those who will have defied the prohibition."

He published a large collection of alchemical works, the Bibliotheca Chemica Curiosa (1702). Many of the 170 works included were already rare.

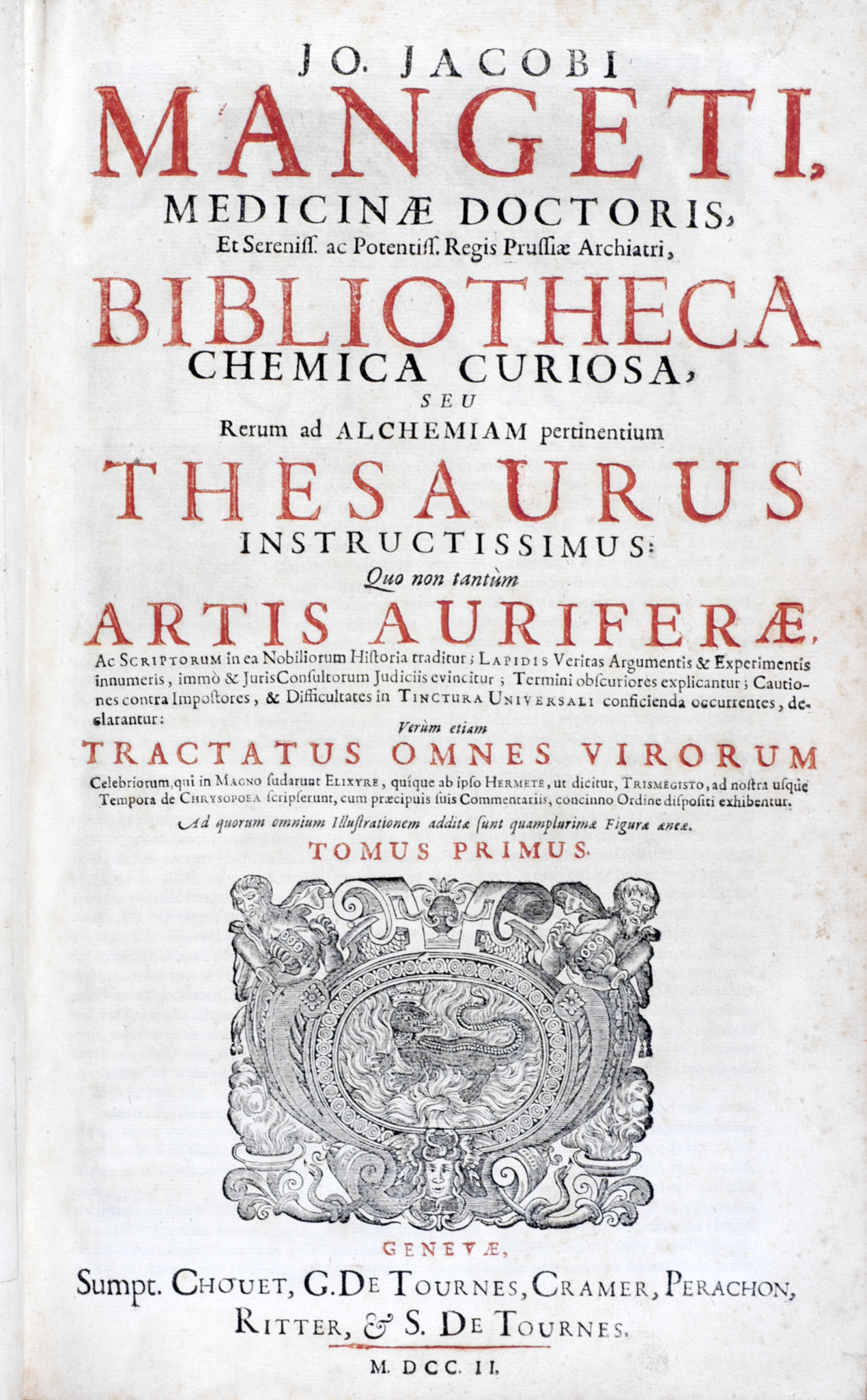
Bibliotheca chemica curiosa, 1702

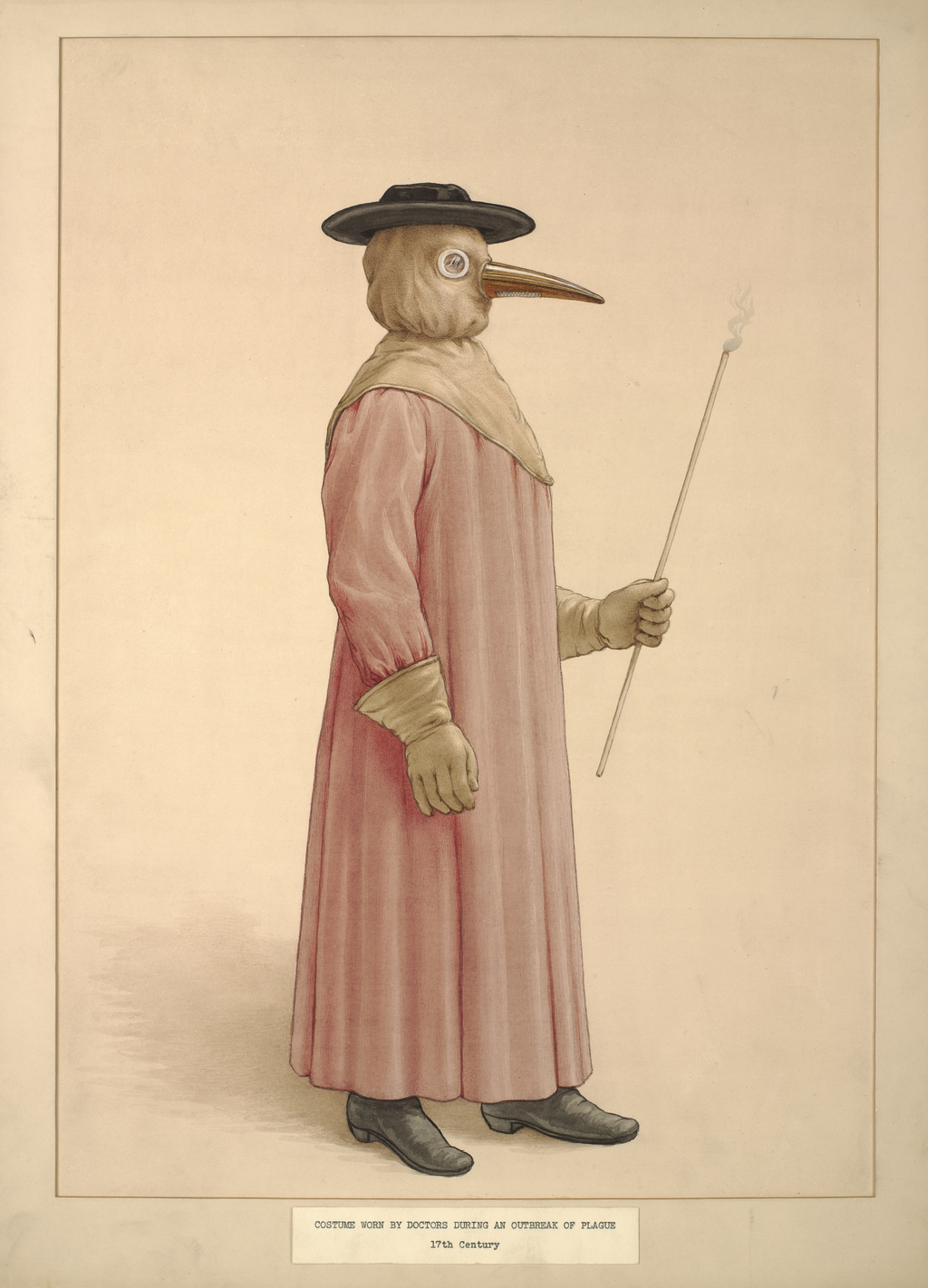
Physician in plague preventive costume, as described by Manget

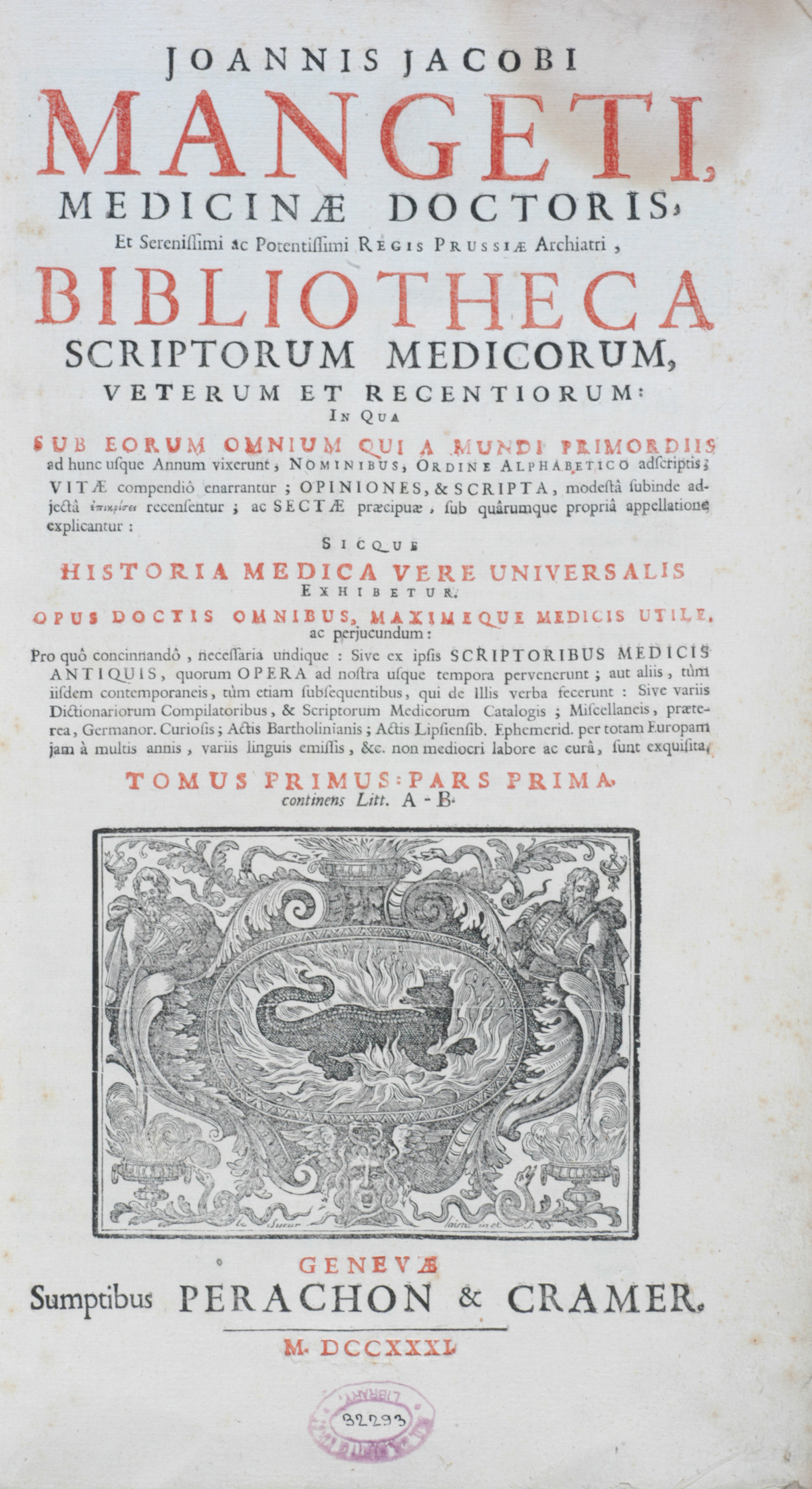
Bibliotheca scriptorum medicorum, 1731

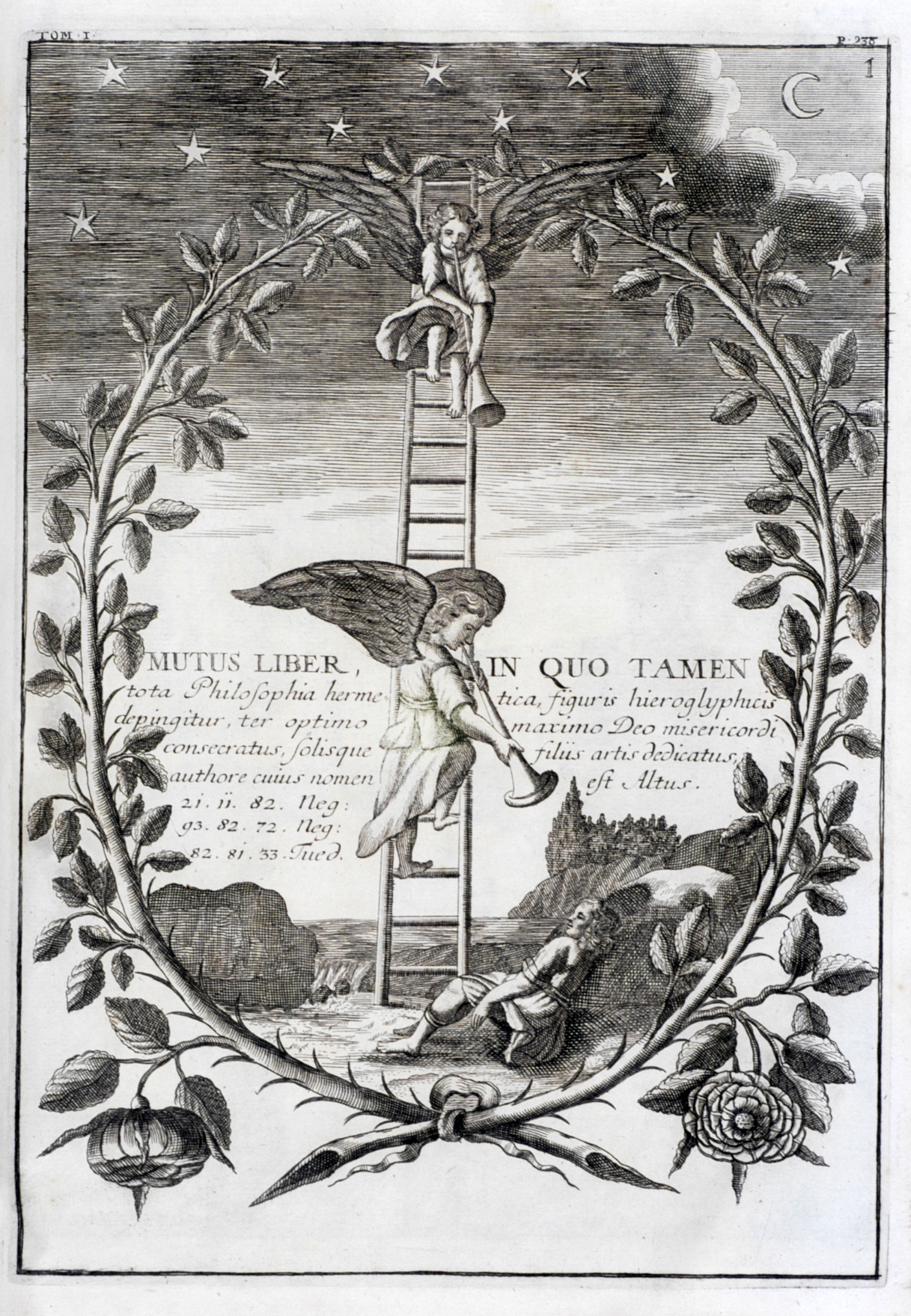
Figure 1, Volume 1, Bibliotheca chemica curiosa

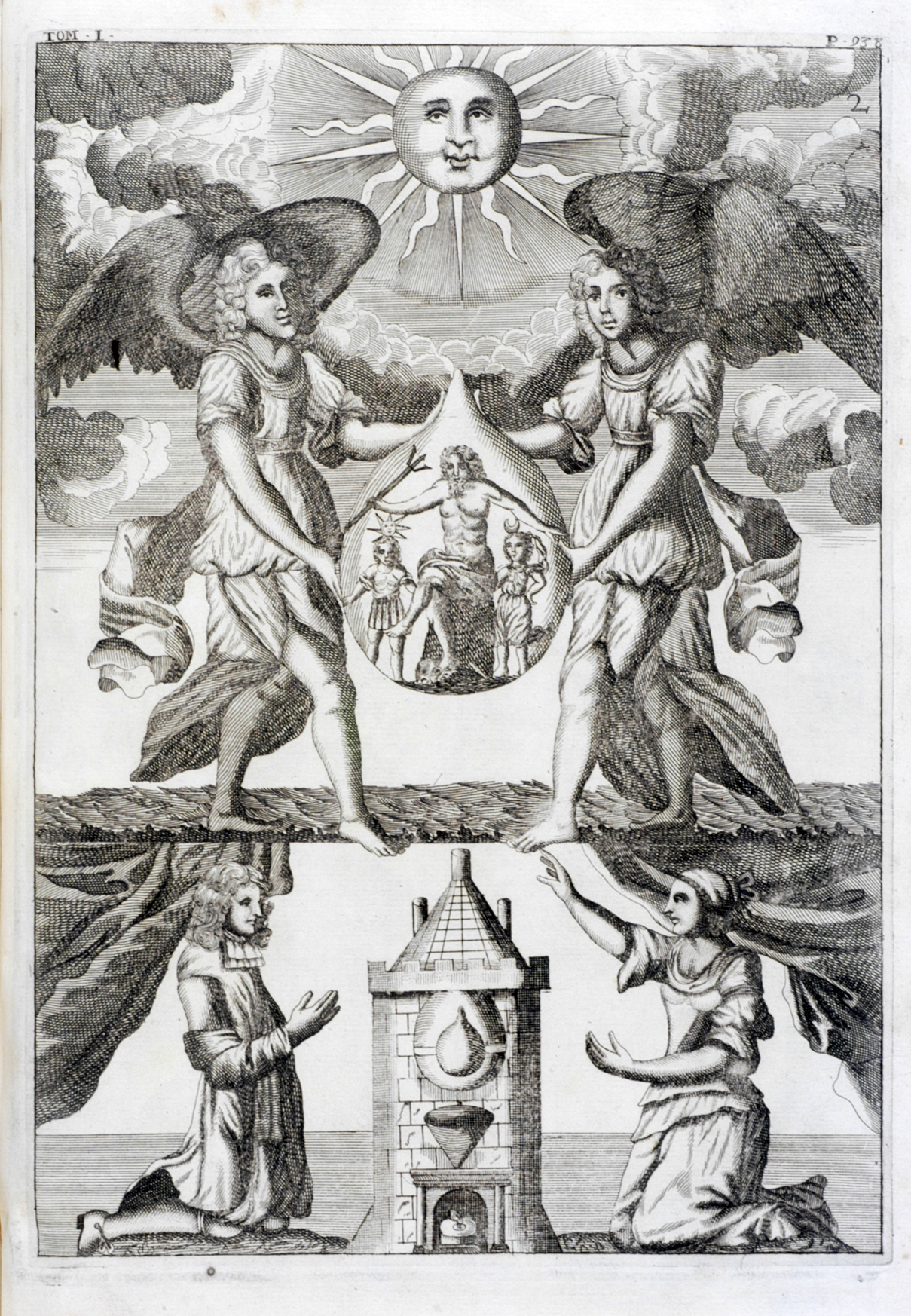
Figure 2, Volume 1, Bibliotheca chemica curiosa

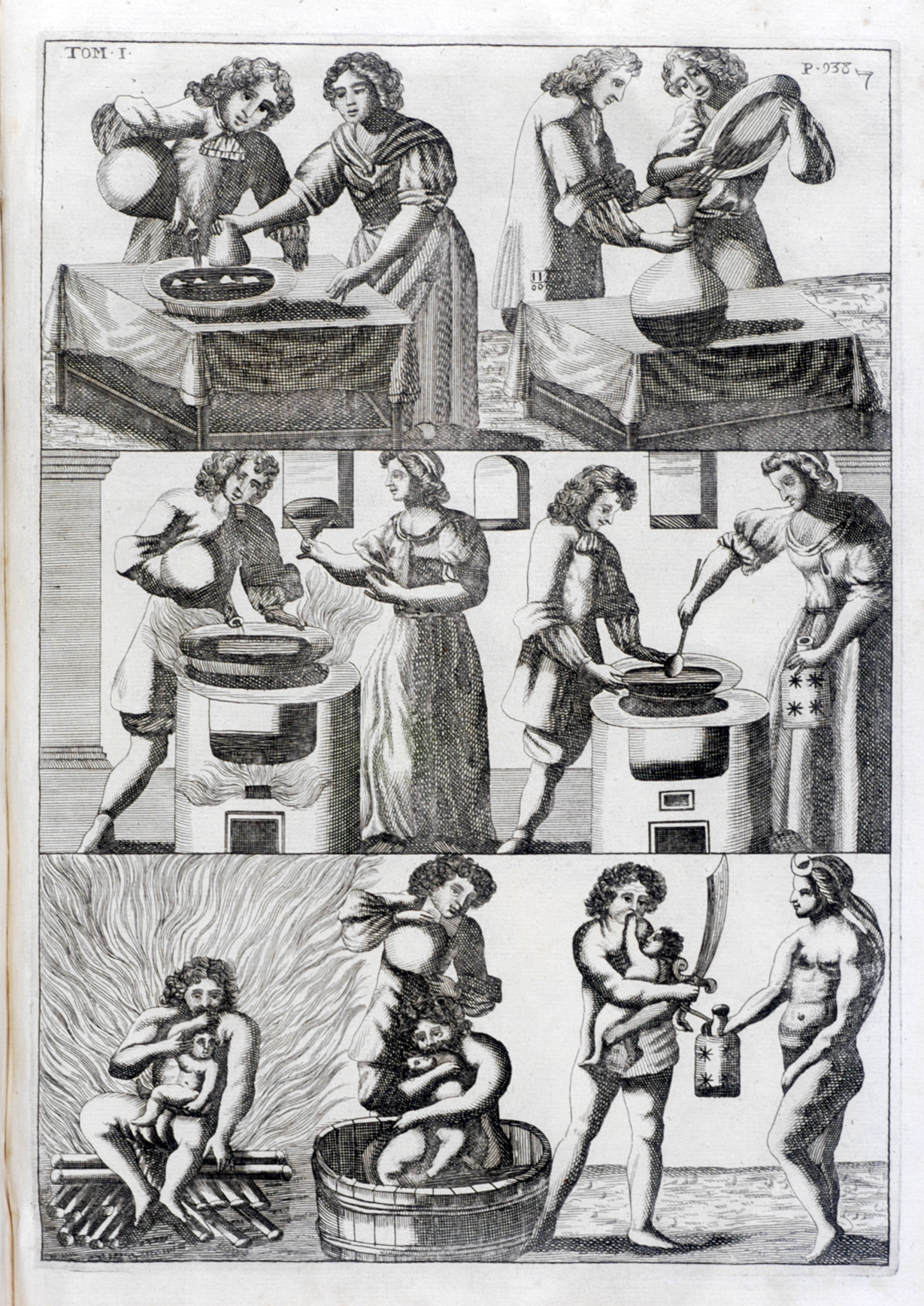
Figure 7, Volume 1, Bibliotheca chemica curiosa

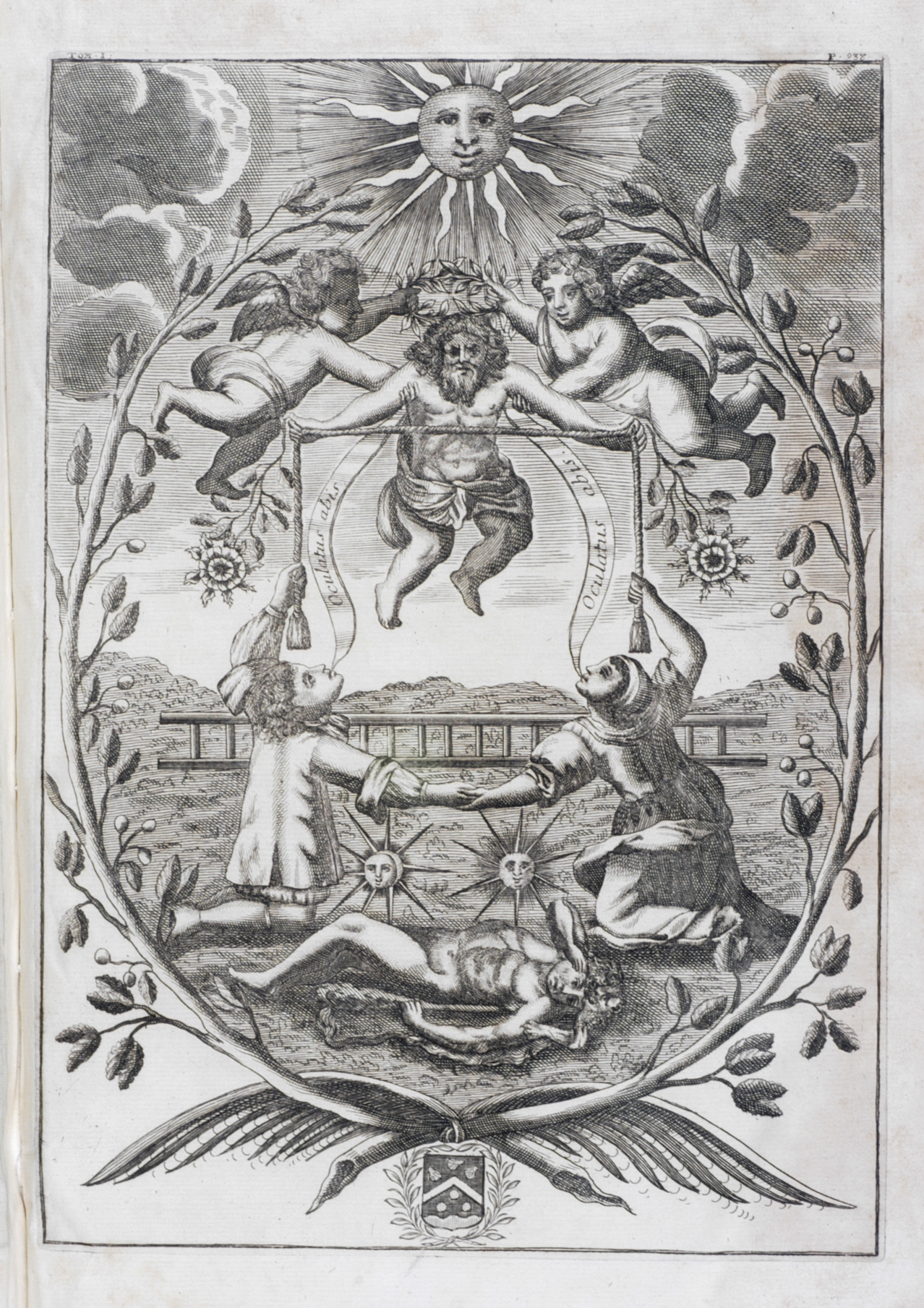
Figure 15, Volume 1, Bibliotheca chemica curiosa

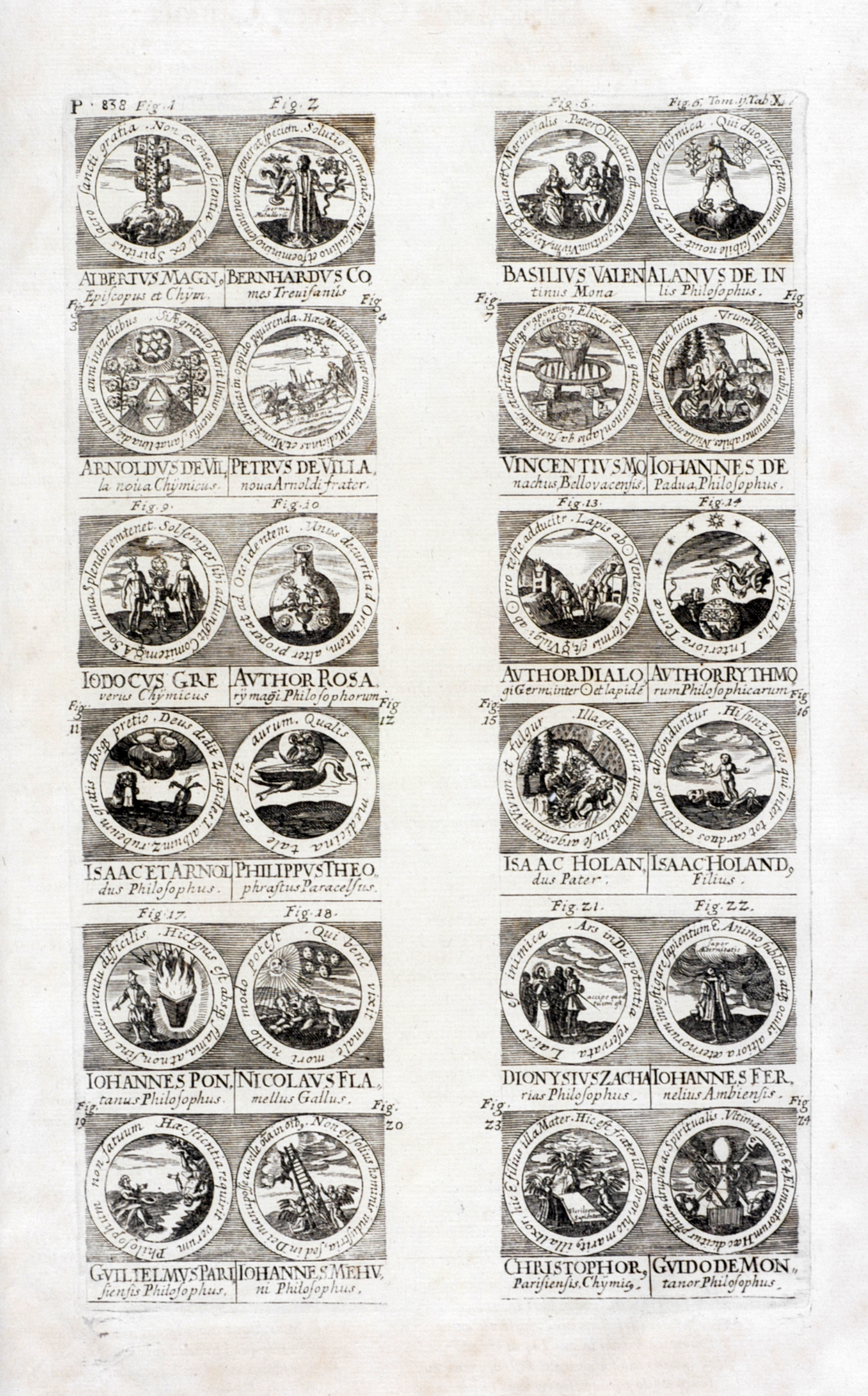
Figures, page 898, Volume 2, Bibliotheca chemica curiosa

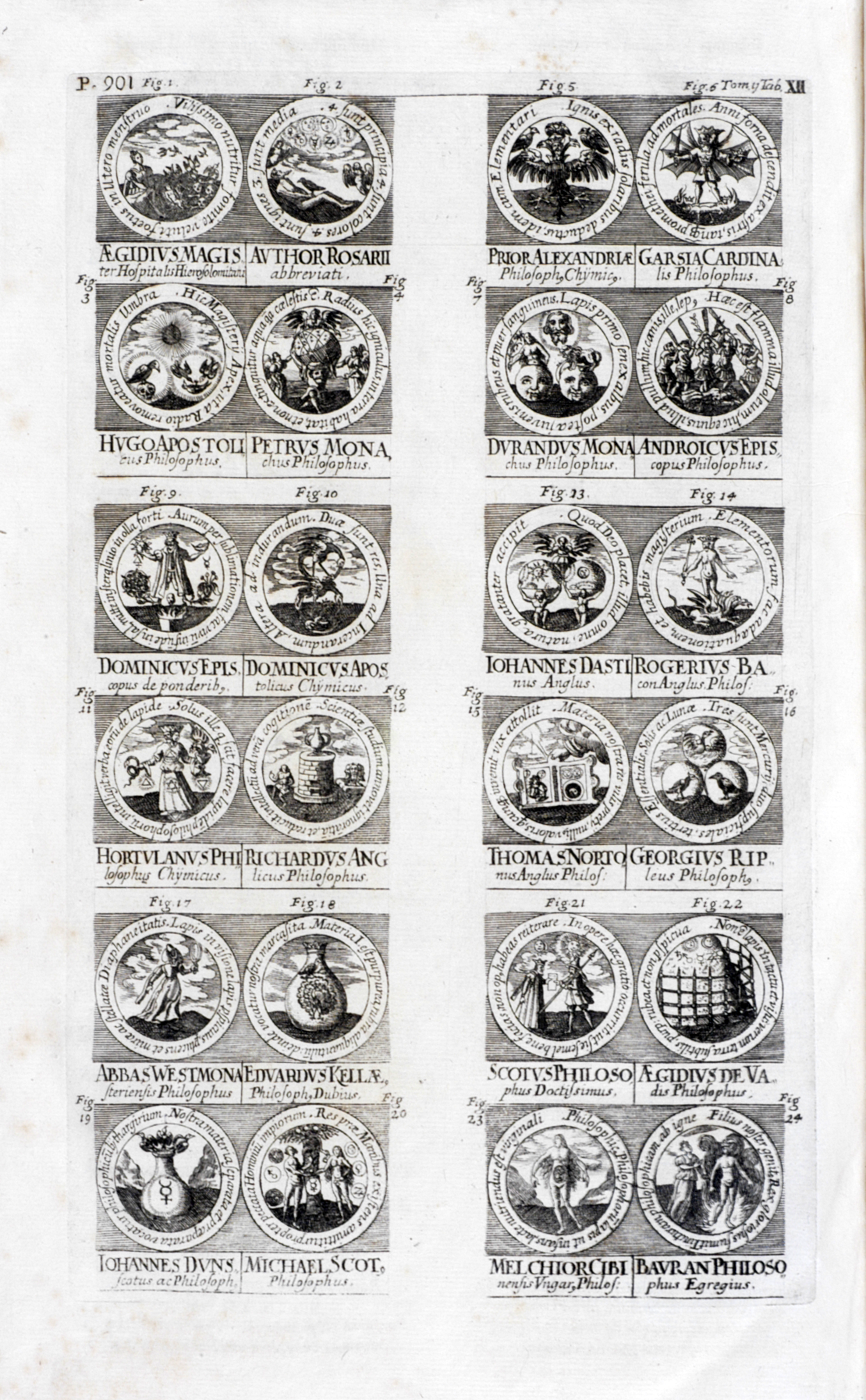
Figures, page 901, Volume 2, Bibliotheca chemica curiosa

== Bibliography ==
- Bibliotheca anatomica, two volumes (Geneva, 1685)
- Bibliotheca curiosa chemica, two volumes (Geneva, 1702)
- Bibliotheca medico-practica sive rerum medicarum thesaurus cumulatissimus: tomis octo comprehensis (Geneva, 1695)

- 1, 1. 1739
- 1, 2. 1739

- 2, 1. 1739
- 2, 2. 1739

- 3, 1. 1739
- 3, 2. 1739

- 4, 1. 1739
- 4, 2. 1739

- Traité de la peste recueilli des meilleurs auteurs anciens et modernes (Geneva, 1721)
