= Library of Sir Thomas Browne =

Defunct library in Norwich, England

The 1711 Sales Auction Catalogue of the Library of Sir Thomas Browne is a catalogue of the books and other written works collected within the personal library of the English physician, philosopher and encyclopedist Sir Thomas Browne (1605–1682), most of which were sold at auction in 1711. Browne's library has been useful to scholars and historians not only in highlighting his erudition, but also in illustrating the proliferation, distribution and availability of books printed in 17th-century Europe, especially those owned by the intelligentsia, aristocracy, priests, physicians and educated merchant-class.

== Biography ==
Browne graduated from the University of Leiden in 1633, having previously studied at the Universities of Montpellier and Padua for his medical degree. Upon his establishment in Norwich as a physician in 1637 he began to cultivate a lifelong bibliophilia, building a private library and acquiring and reading an estimated 1,500 titles. He was adept in five contemporary languages: French, Italian, Spanish, Dutch and Danish. These languages as well as Greek, Hebrew, and Latin (the predominant written language of the Renaissance) are all represented in his library.

== The catalogue ==
The 1711 Sales Auction Catalogue reflects the wide scope of Browne's interests. It includes many of the sources used for his encyclopaedia Pseudodoxia Epidemica, which was published in six editions between 1646 and 1672 and established him as one of the leading intellects of 17th-century Europe.

Browne's library contained many of the Classics of antiquity, and numerous other books on an eclectic variety of subjects including history, geography, philology, philosophy, anatomy, theology, cartography, embryology, medicine, cosmography, ornithology, mineralogy, zoology, travel, law, mathematics, geometry, literature (both Continental and English), the latest advances in astronomy and chemistry, and more esoteric fields such as astrology, alchemy, physiognomy and the Kabbalah are all represented in the Catalogue of his library contents. It was not until 1986, however, that the complete contents of the Catalogue were first made widely available. The American scholar Jeremiah Stanton Finch, Dean Emeritus at Princeton University, took on the task of indexing Browne's work during his retirement, completing the indexing of the books of Sir Thomas and his son Edward Browne's libraries, "after many years in many libraries". Finch noted that the Catalogue advertised books of sculpture and painting, which somehow were never delivered to the auction house. In the event, the auction held upon 8–10 January 1711 was attended by Jonathan Swift and buyers working on behalf of Sir Hans Sloane. Thus an unknown percentage of books auctioned from the Library of Sir Thomas Browne subsequently formed the foundation for the future British Library.

The 1711 Sales Auction Catalogue records the omnivorous reading and bibliophilia which Browne engaged upon for roughly sixty years, and also exemplifies the observation:

to the student of the history of ideas in its modern sense of the inter-relationship between science, art and philosophy, Browne is of great importance.

== Contents ==
=== Greek literature ===
- Aeschylus, Sophocles, Euripides, ed. Johannes Meursius, Leiden 1612
- Apollonius of Rhodes, Argonautica, 2 vols., Leiden 1641
- Archimedes, Opera, 1615
- Aristophanes, Comedies XI, Leiden, 1624
- Aristotle
  - Opera, 1615
  - Rhetorica, 1619
  - De Mundo, 1591
  - Problemata, ed. Ludovico Settala, 1632
- Arrian
  - Ponti Euxini, Geneva 1577
  - de Venatione, Paris 1644
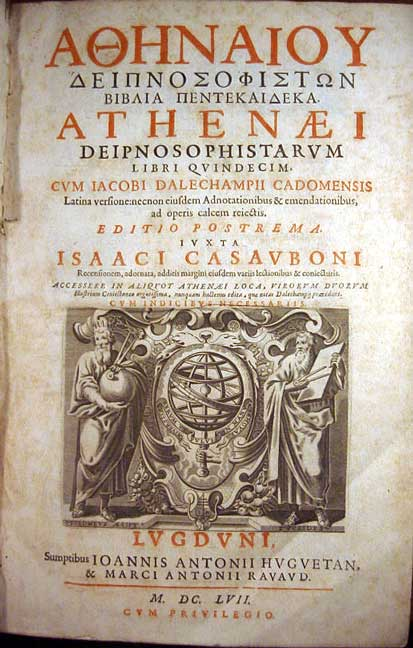
- Frontispiece to 1657 edition of the Deipnosophists
  Athenaeus, Deipnosophistae or Banquet of the learned, ed. Isaac Casaubon, 1612
- Epicurus, Philosophy of, ed. Pierre Gassendi, 2 vols., Leiden 1649
- Euclid, Elementorum Libri 6. priores, London 1620
- Euripides, Tragedies, 1562
- Herodotus, Historia, Frankfurt 1608
- Homer, Opera, Basle 1612
- Iamblichus
  - Life of Pythagoras
  - The Mysteries of Egyptians and Chaldeans, Leyden 1670
- Lucian
  - Opera, 1546
  - Dialogi Selectiores, Paris 1572
- Philo, Opera, Cologne 1613
- Plato, Chalcidii Timaeus, ed. Johannes Meursius, Leiden 1617
- Sibyllina Oracula, 1607
- Theophrastus, Characters, notes by Isaac Casaubon, Leyden 1638
- Xenophon, Cyropaedia, Gk & Lat London 1674

=== Roman literature ===
- Boethius, Consolation of Philosophy, 1653
- Censorinus, De die natali, Leiden 1593
- Cicero
  - Dream of Scipio
  - Opera, 2 vols., 1527
  - Epistulae ad Familiares, 1550
- Florus, Historia, Leiden 1655
- Hyginus, Fabulae, Paris 1578
- Isidore of Seville, Originum, 20 books
- Juvenal, Satyrae, Leyden 1523
- Macrobius, Somnium Scipionis (Dream of Scipio), 1556
- Marcus Aurelius, notes by Meric Casaubon, London 1643
- Martianus Capella, de nuptiis Philologiae et Mercurii, 1577
- Ovid, Opera, London 1656
- Petronius, Satyricon, 1654
- Plautus, Comedies, notes by Denis Lambin, 1581
- Pliny the Elder, Naturalis Historia, Brussels 1496
- Propertius, cum Notis Varior. Traj., 1658
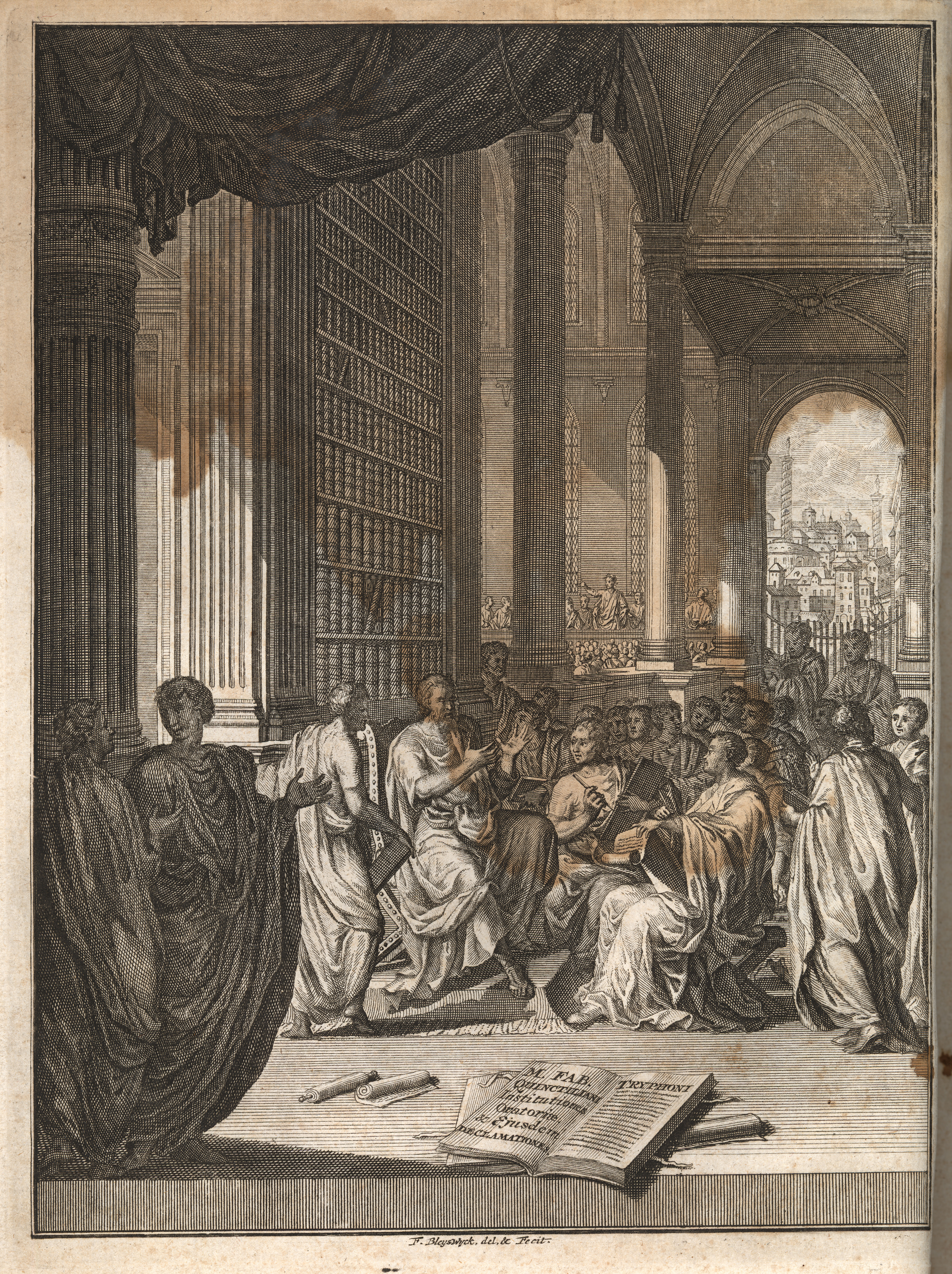
- Frontispiece 1720 edition of Institutio Oratoria, showing Quintilian teaching rhetoric
  Quintilian, Institutio Oratoria, 1575
- Seneca, Tragedies, Leiden 1651
- Suetonius, Lives of the Twelve Caesars, trans. Philemon Holland, 1659
- Terence, Comedies, 1625
- Valerius Maximus, with notes, Leiden 1651
- Virgil, Opera, Amsterdam 1654
- Vitruvius, L'Architetturra di Vitruvio, tradotta & commentata da Daniele Barbaro, Venice 1641

=== Arabic ===
- Alhazen, Opticae Thesaurus, Libri X, Basle 1572
- 'Ali ibn al-'Abbas al-Majusi, Liber Totius Medicine, Venice 1523

=== Contemporary science ===
- François d'Aguilon, Opticorum Libri 6, Antwerp 1613
- Petrus Apianus, Cosmographia, Antwerp 1545
- Isaac Barrow, Euclid's Elements, London 1660
- Mario Bettini, Beehives of Universal Philosophical Mathematics, 1656
- Antonio Bosio, Roma Subterranea cum. fig. 3 Tomi in 1 vol., Cologne 1659
- Robert Boyle, Usefulness of Experimental Philosophy, London 1671
- Henry Briggs, Arithemica Logarithmica, London 1644
- Thomas Digges, Alae seu Scalae Mathematicae, London 1573
- Thomas Fincke, Geometria Rotundi, Basle 1583
- Galileo
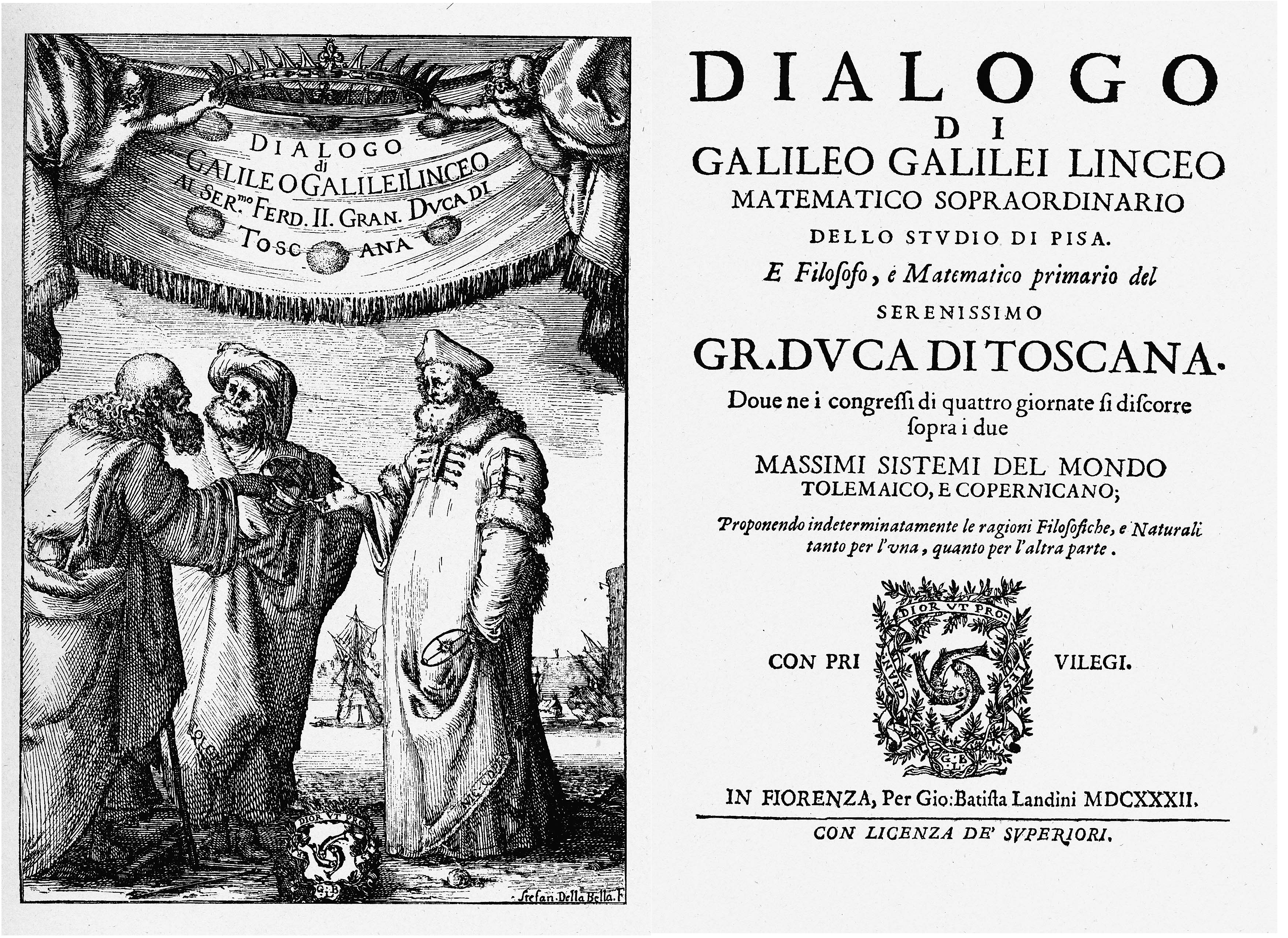
  - Frontispiece and title page of Galileo's Dialogue, 1632
    Dialogue Concerning the Two Chief World Systems, Trent 1635
  - Sidereus Nuncius, London 1653
  - Two World Systems, trans. T. Sainsbury, 1661
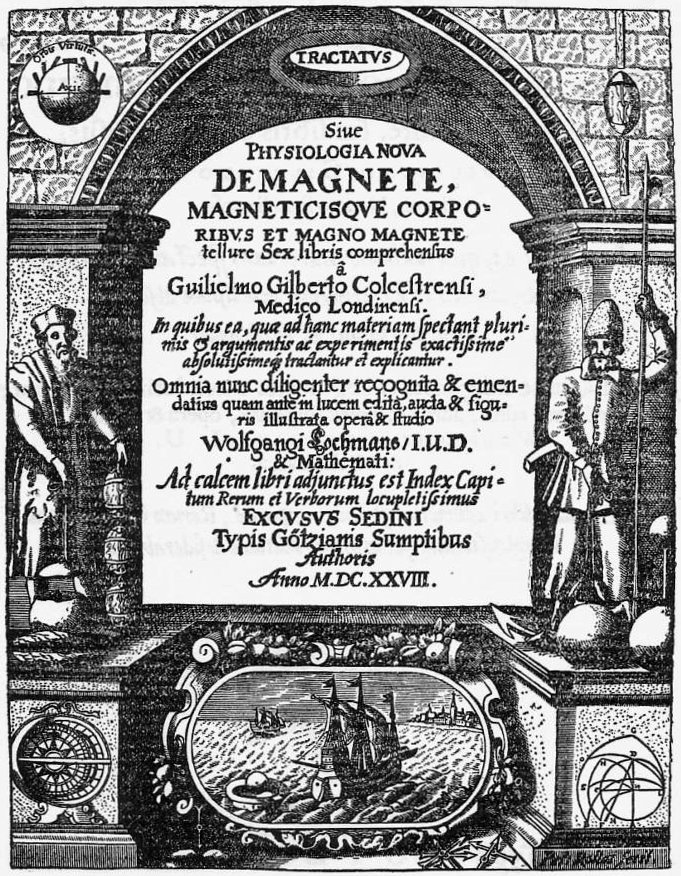
- De Magnete Title page of 1628 edition
  William Gilbert, De Magnete, Magneticisque Corporibus, et de Magno Magnete Tellure, 1600
- Sir Matthew Hale, Observat. touch. the Torricelli Experiment, 1674
- Jean-Baptiste du Hamel
  - de meteoris & fossilbus, Paris 1660
  - de consensu Vet. & Novae Philosophiae, Paris 1663
  - de Corpor. affectionib., Paris 1670
- Robert Hooke, Lectures, London 1678
- Christiaan Huygens, Systema Saturnium, The Hague 1659
- Johannes Kepler
  - Mysterium Cosmographicum, Tübingen 1596
  - De Stella Nova in Pede Serpentis, Prague 1606
  - ad Vitellionem Paralipomena, Frankfurt 1604
- Fortunio Liceti
  - De lucernis antiquorum reconditis, Udine 1652
  - Antiqua Schemata Gemmar. Anular. cum fig., 1653
  - De spontaneo viventium ortu libri quatuor, Vicenza 1618
  - De his, qui diu vivunt sine alimento, Padua 1612
  - De quaesitis per epistolas a claris viris responsa, Bologna 1640
  - De Terra & de Lucidis in Sublimi, Udine 1640
  - De lapide Bononiensi & Qualitis, Udine 1640
  - De regulari motu minimaque parallaxi cometarum coelestium disputationes, Udine 1640
- Jan Marek Marci, Idearum Operatricum Idea, Hannover 1635
- William Oughtred, Clavis Mathematica, London 1648
- Alessandro Piccolomini, De Sphaera, Basle 1565
- Georg Purbach, Theoricae novae Planetarum, Basle 1568
- Robert Recorde, Whetstone of Witte, 1557
- Regiomontanus, Tabulae Directionum & Prosectionum, 1551
- Christoph Scheiner, Rosa Ursina sive Sol, Bracciano 1630
- Gaspar Schott, Magia Universalis Natura Artis, 4 vols., Würzburg 1657
- John Speed, History of Great Britain, 2nd ed., 1627
- Niccolò Fontana Tartaglia, Euclide rassettato & alla Integrità ridotto, 1543
- Godefroy Wendelin, Of the cause of purple rain in Brussels, Brussels 1647

=== Philosophy ===
- Francis Bacon
  - Advancement of Learning, 1628
  - Natural History, 1628
  - Opuscula Philosophica, 1658
- Bellarmine, Apologia pro Jure Princip., 1611
- Charles de Bovelles, Liber de intellectu. Liber de sensibus. Liber de generatione. Libellus de nihilo. Ars oppositorum. Liber de sapiente. Liber de duodecim numeris. Philosophicae epistulae. Liber de perfectis numeris. Libellus de mathematicis rosis. Liber de mathematicis corporibus. Libellus de mathematicis supplementis, Paris 1510
- René Descartes
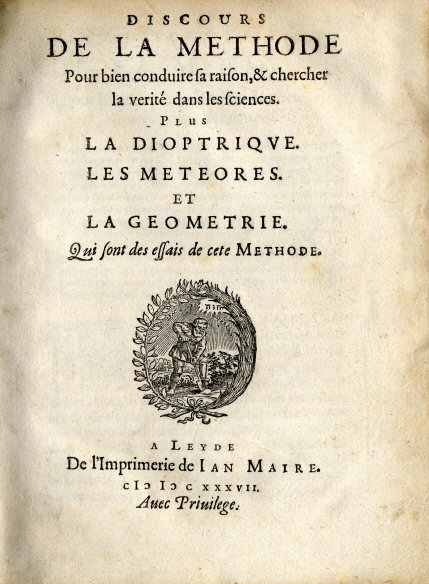
  - Descartes Discourse on Method
    Discourse on Method, 1st ed., 1637
  - Méditations, 1644
  - Meditationes de prima Philosophia, Amsterdam 1644
  - Principia Philosophia, Amsterdam 1656
  - Lettres, Paris 1657
  - de la Lumière &c., Paris 1664
  - les Passions de l'âme, Amsterdam 1650
  - Compendium of Musick, London 1653
  - Of a Method for the well-guiding of Reason, London 1649
- Jan Gruter, Inscriptiones antiquae totius orbis Romani, 2 vols., Heidelberg 1603
- Thomas Hobbes
  - Elementorum Philosophiae Sectio Secunda de Homine, 1658
  - Elementa Philosophica de Cive, 2nd ed., Amsterdam 1647
- Justus Lipsius, Opera, 4 Tomi in 3 vol., Antwerp 1637
- Machiavelli, History of Florence, Strasbourg 1610
- Francis Osborne, Collected Works, 1675
- Blaise Pascal
  - Pensées, 1670
  - Discours sur les mêmes Pensées, 1672

=== Theology ===
- Thomas Aquinas, Summa Theologiae, Paris 1638
- Augustine of Hippo, City of God, 1620
- Richard Baxter, Reasons of the Christian Religion 1667
- Samuel Bochart, Geographica sacra seu Phaleg et Canaan, cum. Tabul Geograph. Caen 1642
- Jean Bodin, Demonomania, Basle 1581
- Johannes Buxtorf
  - Lexicon Chaldaic.Talmudic & Rabbinic Basle 1639
  - Epitome Grammaticae, Hebraea London 1653
  - Lexicon Hebraic.& Chaldaic London 1646
  - Epitome Grammaticae Hebraea Basle 1629
- Clement of Alexandria, Opera, Paris 1629
- Ralph Cudworth, On the true Notion of the Lord's Supper, London 1642
- Pseudo-Dionysius the Areopagite, Opera, Basle 1571
- Erasmus, Preparations for death, Basle 1532
- Joseph Hall, Works, vol. 1st and 3rd London 1647,1662
- Jerome, Opera 9 Tomi, in 4 vol Paris 1643
- Justin Martyr, Opera Paris 1636
- Martin Luther, Commentary on the Epistle to the Galatians, 2nd edit. 1577
- Marin Mersenne, Questions in Genesis, Paris 1623
- Benito Arias Montano, New Testament, Greek & Latin Geneva 1619
- Sebastian Münster
  - Opus Grammat. (Hebrew), Basle 1542
  - Grammatica Chaldaica, Basle 1527
  - Rabbi Abrahami Sphaera Mundi (Hebrew), Latinized 1546
- Alexander Nowell, Catechism 1575
- Origen, Opera, Basle 1571
- James Usher, de Textus Hebraei V. variantib. Lectionibus, London 1652
- George Wither, Discourse of the Nature of Man, and his State after Death 1650

=== Medical ===
- Avicenna, Opera, 2 vols. 1608 Venice
- Thomas Bartholin
  - Anatomia Reformata, Leyden 1651
  - de Medicina Danorun Domestica, Hannover 1666
  - de Luce Animalium, Leyden 1647
  - Historiar. Anatomic. rarior. Cent. VI, 3 vol. Hannover 1654
  - de Pulmonum Substantia et Motu, Hannover 1663
  - de Lacteis Thoracicis, London 1652
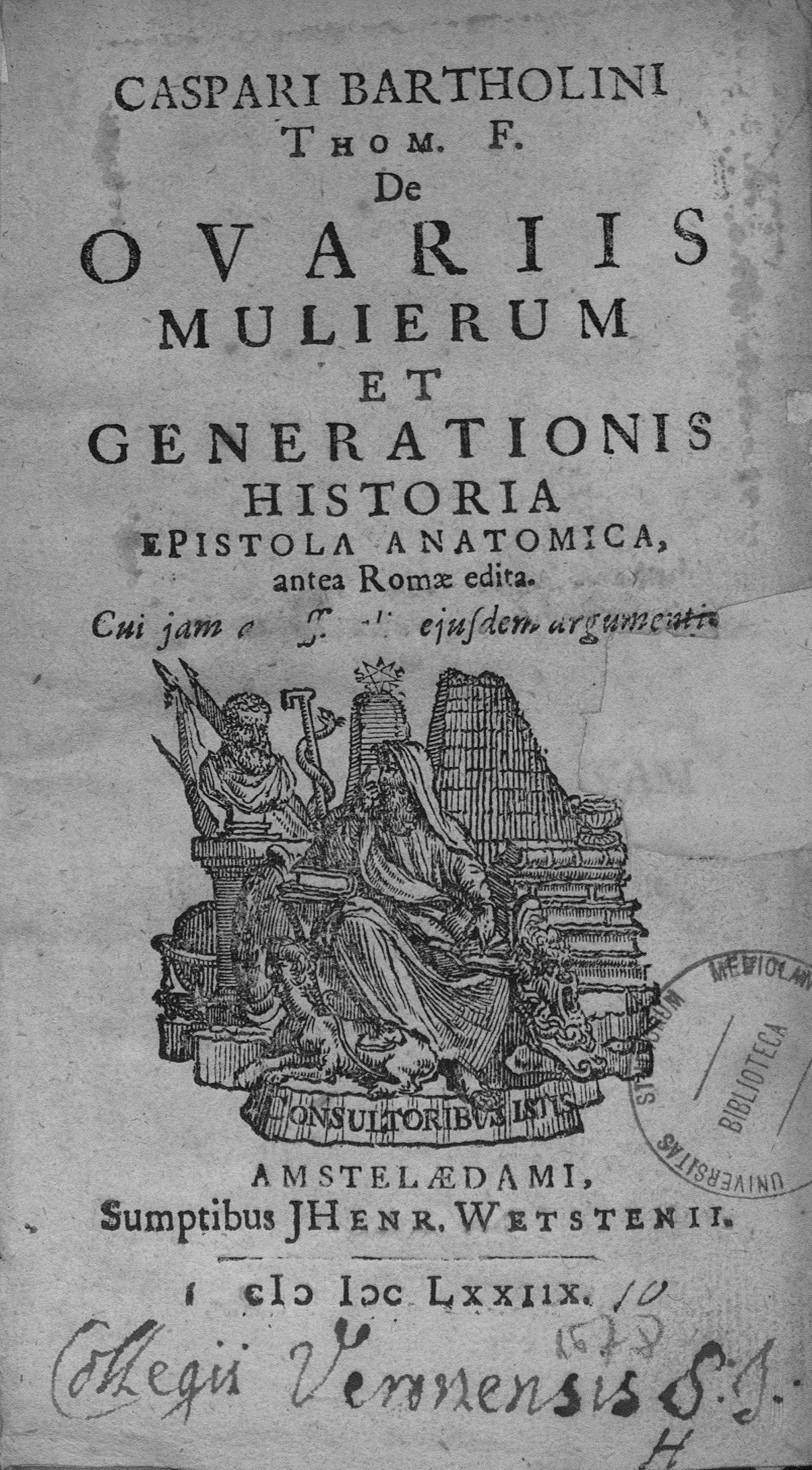
  - De ovariis mulierum et generationis historia epistola anatomica, 1678
    de Ovariis Mulierum & Generat. Historia, 1678
- Gerolamo Cardano Opera, 10 vol. Leyden 1663
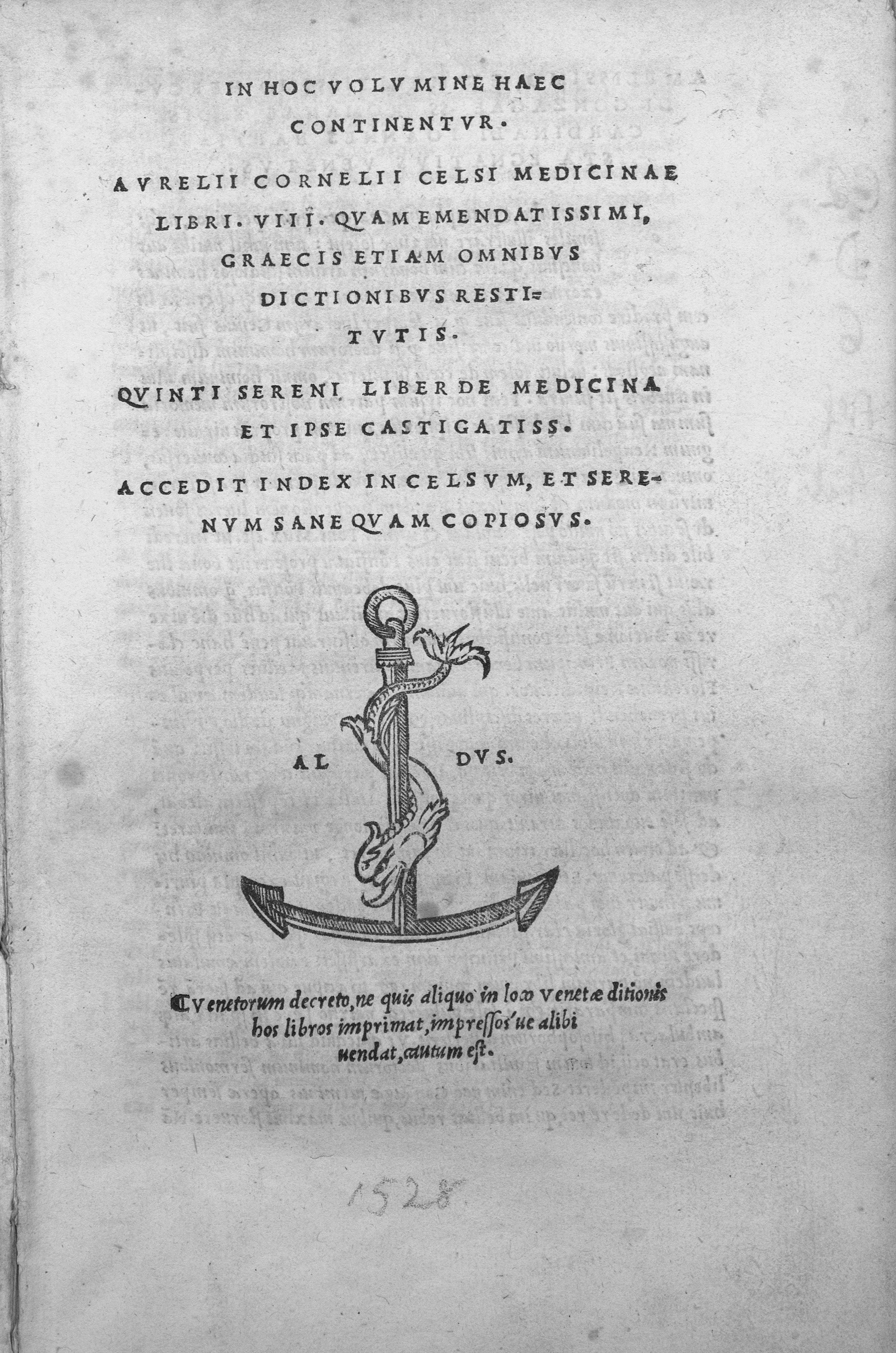
- Cornelius Celsus De medicina
  Aulus Cornelius Celsus De Medicina 8 Libri Basle 1592
- Walter Charleton
  - Enquiries into Human Nature, 1680
  - Darkness of Atheism dispelled by Nature's Light, 1652
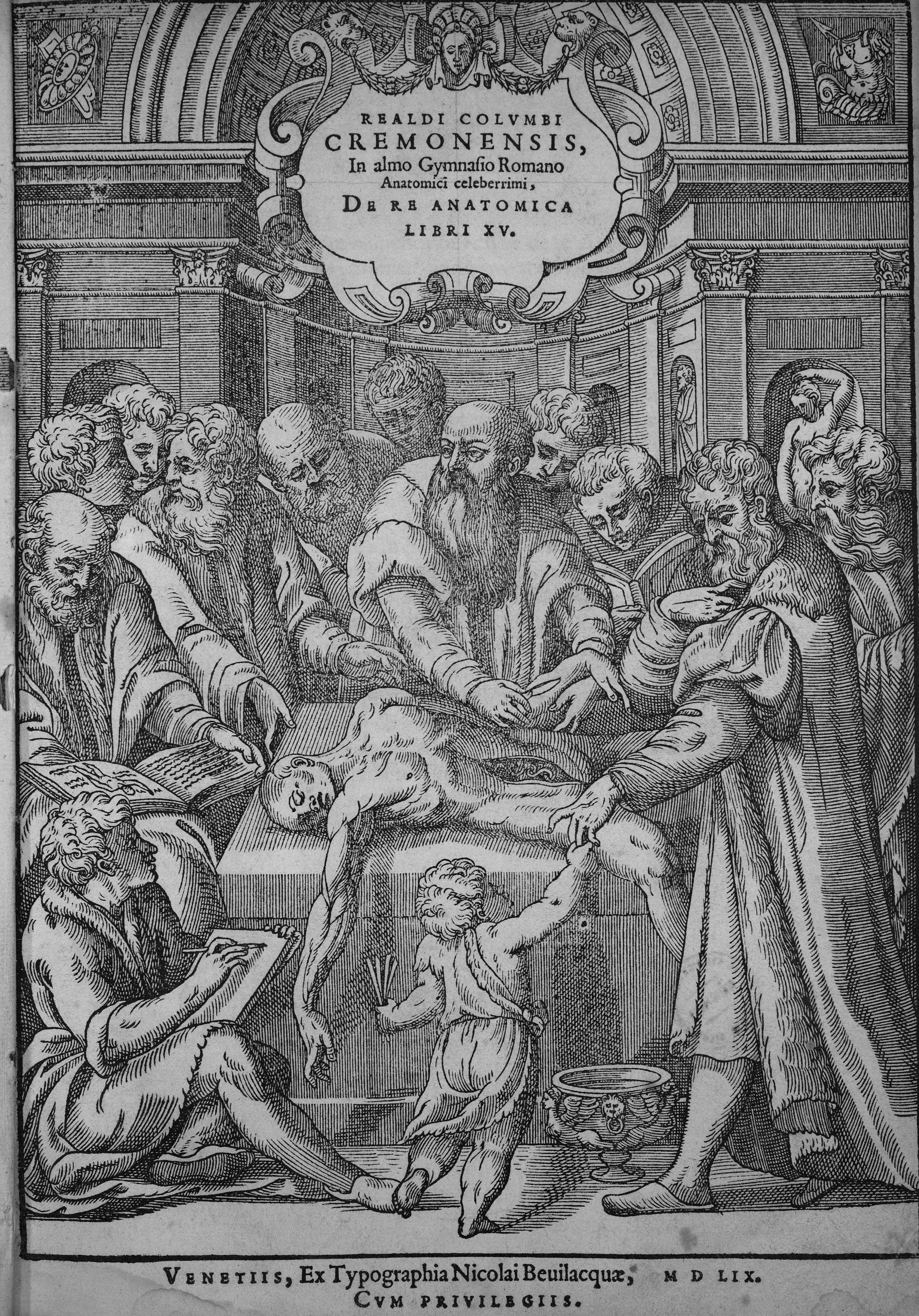
- Title page of Colombo De Re Anatomica
  Realdo Colombo De Re Anatomica Libri XV Venice 1559
- Pedanius Dioscorides
  - Opera, 1598
  - Parabilia, 1598
- Jacques Dubois aka Jacobus Sylvius, de Signis omnib. Medicis Paris 1630
- George Ent, Apolog. pro Circulatione Sanguinis adv. et Parisanum, London 1641
- Charles Estienne, De dissectione Corporis humani, 1545
- Hieronymus Fabricius
  - Opera Anatomica, Paris 1625
  - De Visione, Voce & Auditu, Venice 1600
  - Ab Aquapendente Opera Chirurgica, Venice 1619
- Fallopius, Opera, Frankfurt 1600
- Jean Fernel, Cosmotheoria, 1528
- Leonhart Fuchs
  - de humani Corporis fabrica Leiden 1551
  - Paradoxor. Medicinae Libri 3 Venice 1547
- Galen, Opera, 5 books in 3 vols. Basle 1538
- Pierre Gassendi
  - Vita Epicuri, Leiden 1647
  - de apparente magnitudine solis humilis et sublimis, Paris 1642
  - Instit. Astronomia item Galileo et Kepler, 1683
  - Exercitatio Anatomica de Motu Cordis et Sanguinis in Animalibus, 1648
- Francis Glisson
  - De ventriculo & Intestinis, London 1677
  - de Rachitide, London 1650
- Jonathan Goddard, Unhappy condition of Practice of Physick in London, 1670
- Johannes Goropius Becanus, Origines Antwerpianae 1569
- William Harvey
  - De Generatione, London 1651
  - Exercitatio Anatomica de Motu Cordis et Sanguinis in Animalibus
- Nathaniel Highmore Corporis humani disquisitio anatomica 1651
- Hippocrates
  - Opera 1624
  - Aphorismi & Prognost in Greek and Latin, ed. Jo. Butino 1625
  - Coacae Praenotiones, notes by John Johnson, Amsterdam 1660
  - de Morbis Mulierum, Paris 1585
  - Praenotiones, Paris 1585
- Richard Lower, De Corde: item de motu & colore sanguinis, London 1670
- Marcello Malpighi
  - De viscerum structura, London 1669
  - de formatione Pulli in Ovo, London 1673
  - de Viscerum Structura, London 1669
- Adrian von Mynsicht Thesaurus et Armamentarium Medico-Chymicum 1631
- Julius Caesar Scaliger, On Insomnia, Geneva 1610
- Jan Swammerdam
  - Uteri Muliebris Fabrica, London 1680
  - of Respiration, Leiden 1667
- Thomas Sydenham
  - Observationes Medical., London 1676
  - de Podagra & Hydrope, London 1683
  - Schedula Monitoria de nova Febris Ingressu, London 1686
  - Epist. duae de Morbis Epidem. & de Lue Venera, London 1680
  - Dissertatio Epistolaris, London 1682
- Franciscus Sylvius a.k.a. Franz de la Boe
- Vesalius, De humani corporis fabrica 8 Books 1555
- Thomas Willis
  - Opera varia, 5 vols. London 1664
  - Cerebri Anatome cum fig., London 1664

=== Esoteric ===
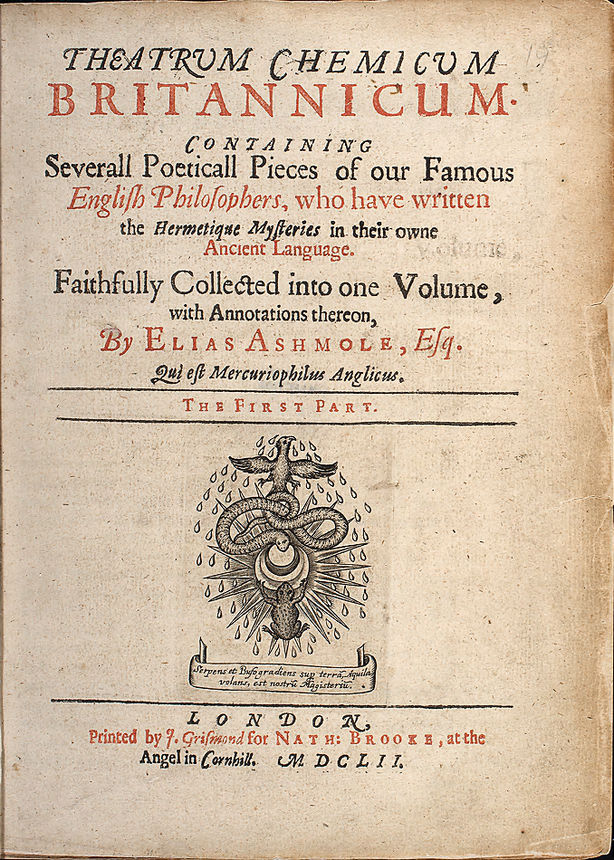
- Theatrum Chemicum Britannicum
  Elias Ashmole ed., Theatrum Chemicum Britannicum, 1652
- J.J. Becher Physica subterranea Frankfurt 1669
- Guido Bonatti de Astronomica Tract Basel 1550
- Tommaso Campanella, 7 Astrological books, Frankfurt 1630
- Jerome Cardan Opera omnia 10 vols. Leiden 1663
- Arthur Dee, Fasciculus Chemicus
- Marsilio Ficino, Theologia Platonica de Immortalitate Animorum, Paris 1559
- Jacques Gaffarel, Unheard-of Curiosities, Paris 1650
- Lucas Gauricus, super Dieb. Decretoriis sive Criticis Axiomata Rome 1546
- Francesco Giorgi, De harmonia mundi, Venice 1525
- Johann Glauber, de natura Salium, Amsterdam 1658
- Helvetius, Miraculo transmutandi Metallica, Antwerp 1667
- Heinrich Khunrath Medulla Distillatoria & Medica. Hamburg 1638
- Athanasius Kircher
  - Ars Magna Lucis et Umbrae, Rome 1646
  - Obeliscus Pamphilius, Rome 1650
  - Oedipus Aegyptiacus, Rome 1652
  - Magnes sive de Arte Magnetica, Rome 1654
  - Mundus Subterraneus, 2 Vols. Amsterdam 1665
  - Iter Exstaticum Rome 1660
- Raymund Lull, Vademecum, quo sontes Alchemica Art, 1572
- Pico della Mirandola Cabalistarum Selectiora Obscurioraque Dogmata, Venice 1569
- Jean-Baptiste Morin Astrologica Gallica 1661
- Paracelsus, Opera Medico-Chimica, Frankfurt 1603
- Petrae, Nosologia Harmonica Dogmatica et Hermetica, 1615
- Giambattista della Porta
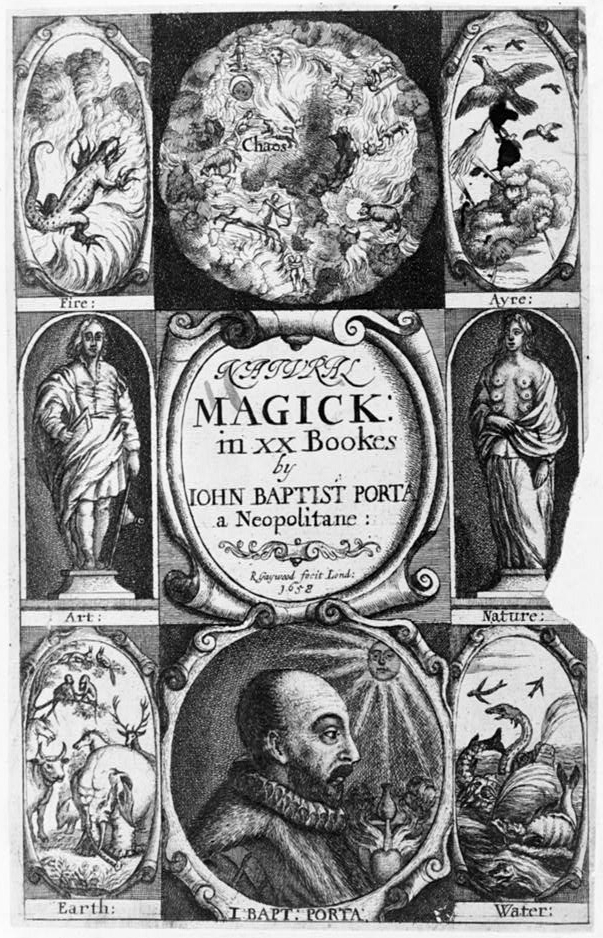
  - Frontispiece of English translation of Natural Magick London (1658)
    Natural Magic, 1644
  - Villa, 12 Books Frankfurt 1592
  - Phytognomica, Naples 1588
  - Coelestis Physiogranonia, Naples 1603
  - de Miracoli & Maravigliosi Effetti dalla Natura prodotti, Venice 1665
- William Ramsay, Judicial Astrology vindicated 1651
- Henry Ranzovus, Astrologia Scientiae Certitudo, 1585
- Martin Ruland, Dictionary of alchemy, 1612
- Oswald Schreckenfuchs Commentaries on George Peurbach Basle 1569
- Sendivogius, The true secret Philosophy, Castile 1651
- Johannes Trithemius, Polygraphiae Libri 6., Cologne 1571
- Basil Valentine, Currus Triumphalis, with fig., Amsterdam 1671
- Pierio Valeriano Bolzani Hieroglyphica sive de sacris Aegyptiorum litteris 1631
- Thomas Vaughan, A Hermeticall Banquet drest by a Spagyrical Cook, 1652
- Blaise de Vigenère, Tract du Feu & du Sel, Rouen 1642
- Vossius, De Idolatria (1642)
- Johann Weyer, Opera, Amsterdam 1660
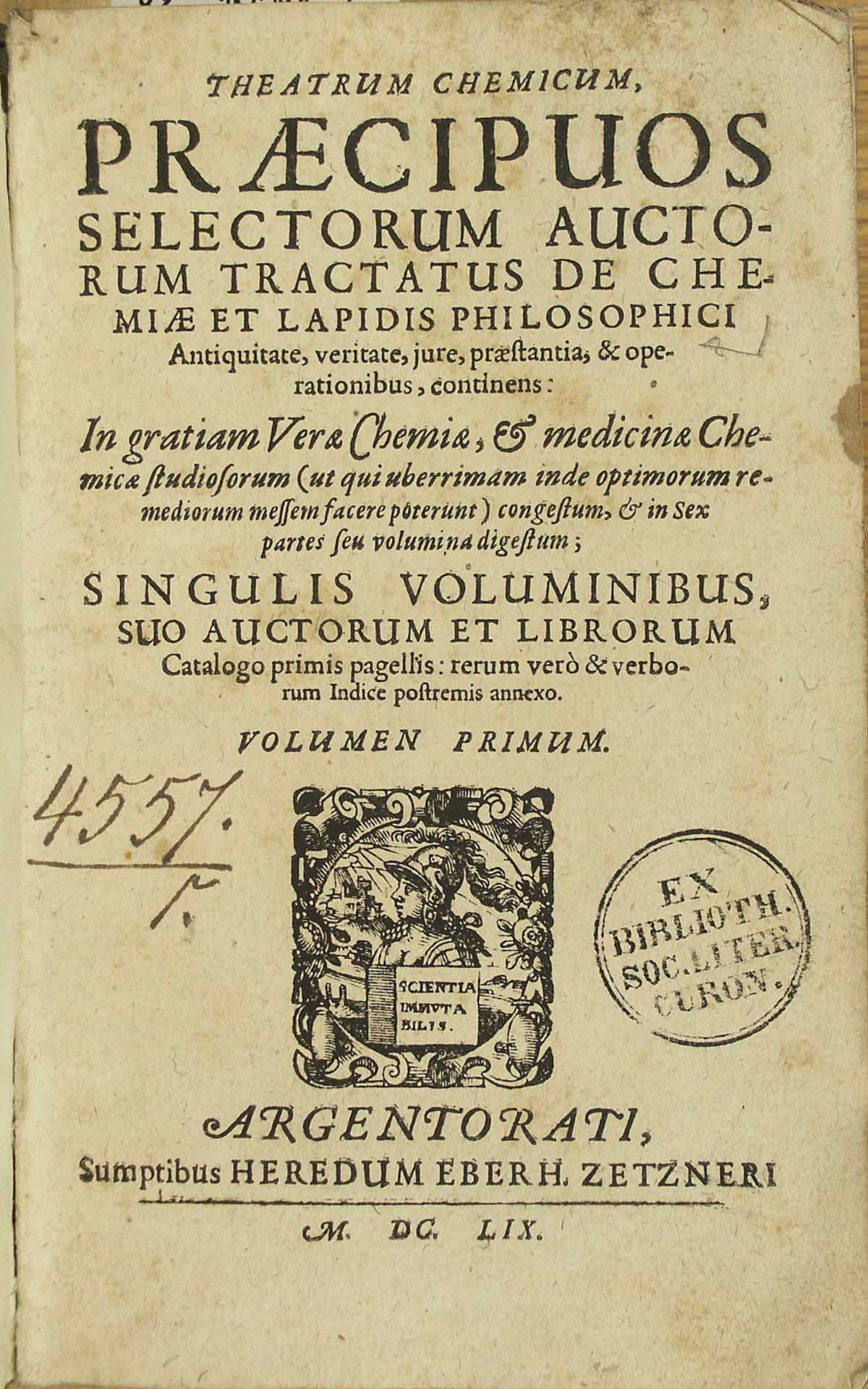
- Page One of Theatrum Chemicum Vol. I (1602)
  Lazarus Zetzner (ed.), Theatrum Chemicum, 5 vols inc. vol. 1 Gerhard Dorn Strasbourg 1613

=== Natural history ===
- Georg Agricola
  - de Re Metallica, Basle 1621
  - de Ortu & Causis Subterraneor, Basle 1558
- Ulisse Aldrovandi
  - Museum Metallicum cum fig., Bologna 1648
  - Serpentium and Draconum historia cum fig., Bologna 1640
  - Ornithtologia sive de Avibus Historia, cum fig., Frankfurt 1610
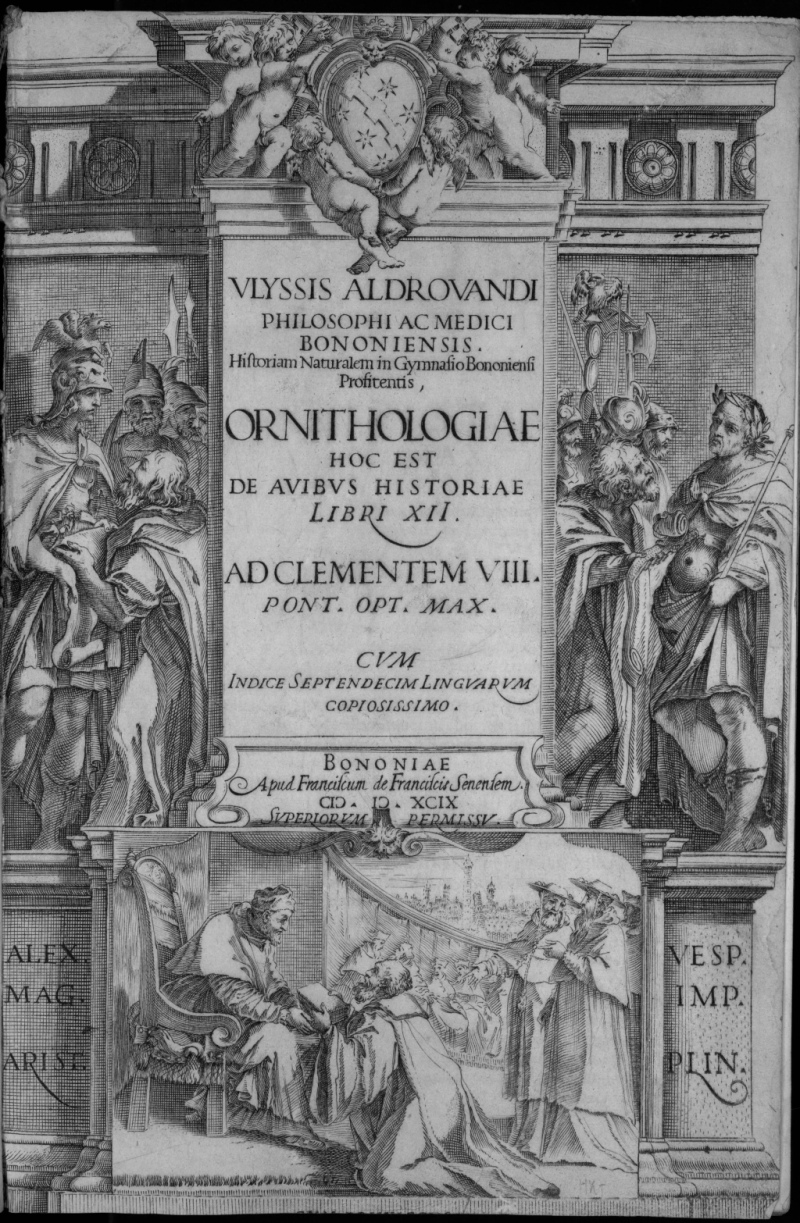
    Aldrovandi's Ornithology
  - Quadrupedum Bisulcorum Historia, cum fig., Bologna 1642
  - de Quadrupedib. Digitatis Viviparis & Oviparis, 1637
  - de Quadupedib. Animalibus & Piscibus, Frankfurt 1610
  - Monstror. Historia, cum fig., Bologna 1642
- Prospero Alpini
  - de Medicina Medicae, Patav. 1611
  - de Plantis Egypti, Patav. 1640
  - de Medicina Egypti, 1646
  - de praesagienda Vita & Morte Aegrotantium, Venice 1601
- C. Bauhin
  - Prodomus Theatri Botanici, Frankfurt 1620
  - Pinax Theatri Botanici, Basle 1623
  - de Hermaphroditor. Natura, 1614
- J. Bauhin
  - Historica Plant., 3 Vols. 1650
  - Hist. Fontis & Balnei Bollenis, Montpellier 1598
- J.J. Becher, Physica Subterranea, Frankfurt 1669
- Pierre Belon, Histoire de la Nature des Oiseaux avec leurs Descriptions & naises traits retirez du Naturel, Paris 1555
- Carolus Clusius
  - Exoticorum libri decem Leiden 1605
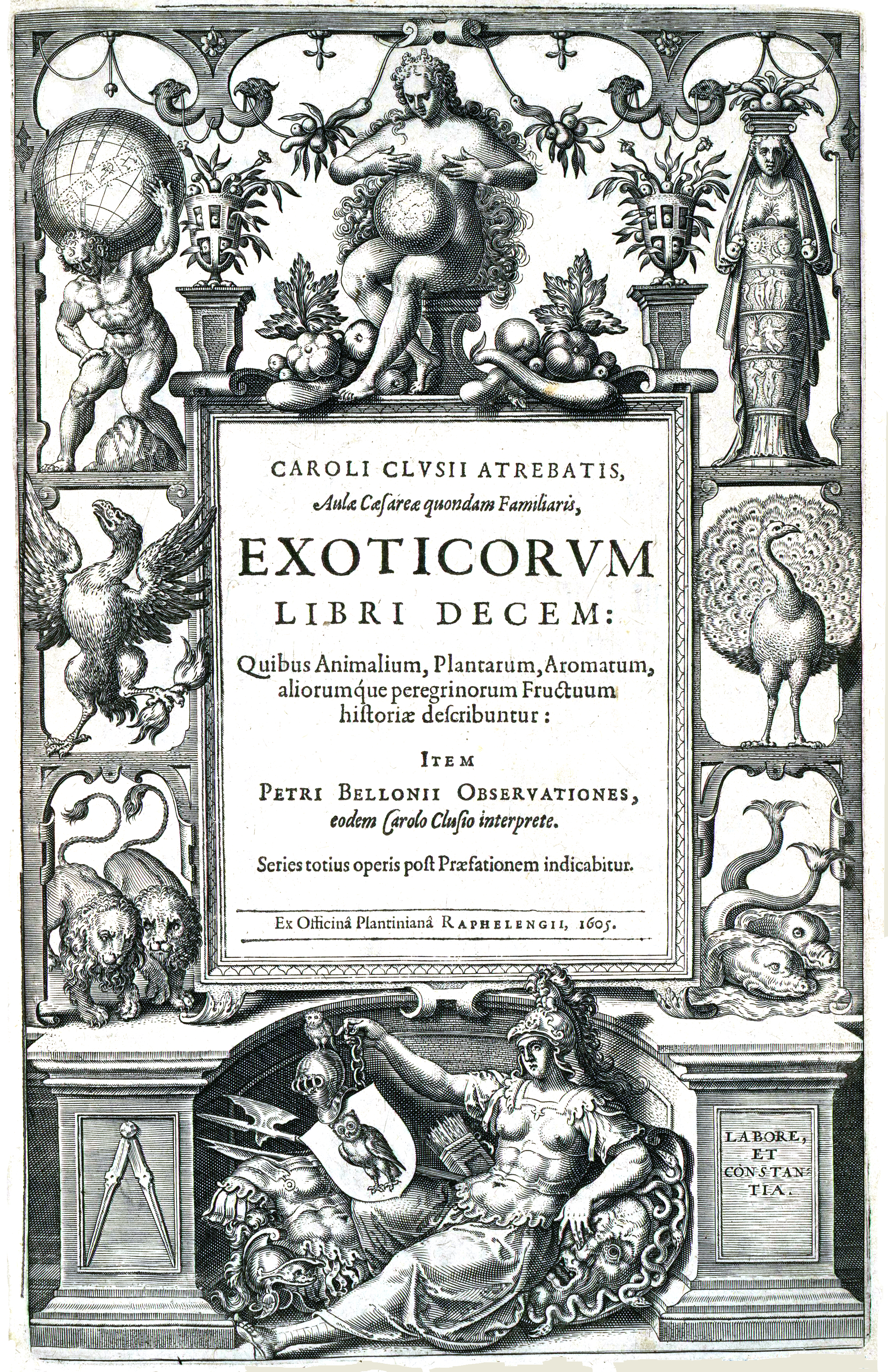
    Carolus Clusius Exoticorum libri decem
  - Stripium novae descrip. cum fig. Leiden 1611
- Conrad Gessner
  - Opera, 4 vols. Zurich 1551
  - de Avibus, cum fig. illuminatus
  - Epistolae Medicinales Zurich 1577
- Thomas Muffet
  - De Insect cum fig, London 1634
  - Nosomantica Hippocratea, Frankfurt 1588
- John Ray
  - Catalogus Plantar. Angliae, London 1670
  - Historia Plantarum, London 1670
- Guillaume Rondelet De Piscibus Marinis 1554
- Nicolas Steno
  - Concerning Solids naturally contained within solids, 1671
  - Elementor Myologiae Specimen, cum fig., Amsterdam 1669
  - Observationes Anatomicae cum fig., Leiden 1662
  - de Cerebri Anatome, Leiden 1671
- Francis Willughby, Ornithologia, cum fig. London 1676
- Olaus Wormius, Museum Wormianum, Leyden 1655

=== Literature ===
- Abraham Cowley, Poems, with his Davideis 1656
- Dante, La Terza Rima
- Edmund Gayton's Pleasant notes upon Don Quixote 1654
- George Herbert, The Temple, sacred poems, Cambridge 1641
- Ben Jonson, Works, 2 Vols. 1616/1640
- Milton
  - Paradise Lost, 1674
  - Paradise Regained, with Samson Agonistes, 1671
- Edmund Spenser
  - Works, 1679
  - The Faerie Queene in 12 books, 1609
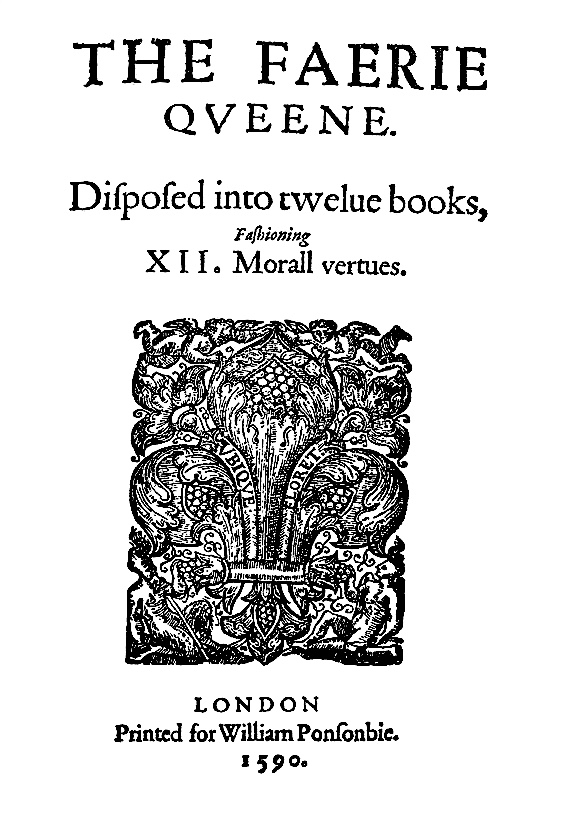
    The Faerie Queene frontispiece

=== Geography and history ===
- Thomas Fuller, A Pisgah-Sight of Palestine with maps, 1650
- John Greaves
  - A description of the Grand Signiors Seraglio 1650
  - Pyramidographia, or a Description of the Pyramids in Egypt 1646
- Saxo Grammaticus, Gesta Danorum Paris, 1514
- James Howell, Of the Precedency of Kings, 1664
- Athanasius Kircher, China Illustrata, Amsterdam 1667
- Gerardus Mercator, Atlas sive Cosmographicae Meditationes de Fabrica Mundi et Fabricati Figura, Amsterdam 1613
- Claude Mydorge, Examen du Livre des recreations Mathematiques, Paris 1639
- Abraham Ortelius
  - Ortelius Theatrum Orbis Terrarum
    Theatrum Orbis Terrarum Antwerp 1574
  - Thesaurus Geographic. recognit. & auctus 1611
  - Itinerar. per Galliae Belgicae partes Plant. 1584
- Strabo
  - Geographia 17 Books Commentary Isaac Casaubon Paris 1620
  - Of the Kingdom of Naples, 1654
  - Of the Signorie of Venice, 1651
  - Of Hungary and Transylvania, 1664
  - Instructions for Foreign Travels, 1642

=== Miscellaneous ===
- Sebastián de Covarrubias, Emblems Morales Madrid 1610
- Thomas Morley, A Plaine and Easie Introduction to Practicall Musicke London 1597
- Valentin Schindler, Lexicon Pentaglotton Hebraic., Chaldic., Syrian., Arabic., 1612
- Artificia Hominum, Miranda Naturae, in Sina & Europa, 1655
- Ethiopian Dictionary 1674

== Sources ==
- A Facsimile of the 1711 Sales Auction Catalogue of Sir Thomas Browne and his son Edward's Libraries. Introduction, notes and index by J.S. Finch (E.J. Brill: Leiden, 1986)
