= Fasciculus Chemicus =

Alchemical writings compiled by Arthur Dee

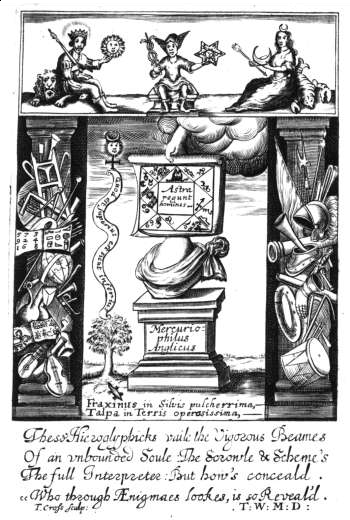
Frontispiece of Fasciculus Chemicus

Fasciculus Chemicus or Chymical Collections. Expressing the Ingress, Progress, and Egress, of the Secret Hermetick Science out of the choicest and most famous authors is an anthology of alchemical writings compiled by Arthur Dee (1579–1651) in 1629 while resident in Moscow as chief physician to Czar Michael I of Russia.

Fasciculus Chemicus was revised by Dee sometime between 1631 and 1633 and translated from Latin into English by Elias Ashmole in 1650 under the anagrammatic pseudonym of "James Hasolle" (by substitution of the letter J for I). Arthur Dee however, was displeased with Ashmole's translation, and wrote to him:

I am sorry you or any man should take pains to translate any book of that art into English, for the art is vilified so much already by scholars that do daily deride it, in regard they are ignorant of the principles. How then can it any way be advanced by the vulgar? But to satisfy your question, you may be resolved that he who wrote Euclid's Preface was my father. The 'Fasciculus', I confess, was my labour and work.

Arthur Dee's principal sources in his alchemical anthology include Petrus Bonus, John Dastin, Gerhard Dorn, Raymund Lull and Michael Maier. Arthur Dee lists the stages of the alchemical opus in Fasciculus as ten in number:

1. Natural Matter 2. Preparation 3. Weight in preparation 4. The philosopher's Fire 5. The Rise or birth of the Stone 6. The Weights of 2nd Work 7. Imbibition 8. Fermentation 9. Projection 10. Multiplication

During the 1650s an easing of regulations on the licensing of printing-presses and the subject-matter of leaflets, pamphlets and books occurred in England. This allowed the newly liberalised printing presses of the Protectorate of Oliver Cromwell to cater to the reading public's fears and speculations on England's future. The social uncertainties engendered by the social trauma of the Civil War, the execution of King Charles I and the establishment of the Commonwealth and Protectorate, resulted in a vigorous interest in esoteric topics during the 1650s decade in England.

Dee's anthology was in the vanguard of a revived interest in alchemy in Britain throughout the 1650s, the foremost publication being Ashmole's major edition of British alchemical literature, Theatrum Chemicum Britannicum (1652). A manuscript copy of Fasciculus Chemicus is listed as once in the Library of Sir Thomas Browne.

== Sources ==
- Fasciculus chemicus of Arthur Dee; translated by Elias Ashmole; edited by Lyndy Abraham. Published by Garland Press, N.Y., December 1996.
