= John Dastin =

English alchemist

John Dastin (c.1293 – c.1386) was an English alchemist of the fourteenth century. Little is known of his life beyond the texts which are attributed to him (A biographical notice De vita, aetate ac scripsis Johannis Dastin is found in a 17th-century manuscript: Ms Oxford, Bold. Libr., Ashmol. 1445, VIII, fol. 53). Dastin is known for correspondence with Pope John XXII and Cardinal Napoleone Orsini in defense of alchemical practice, dated to 1320.

Work attributed to Dastin was included in the 1625 Harmoniae imperscrutabilis Chymico-Philosophicae of Hermannus Condeesyanus, the 1629 Fasciculus Chemicus of Arthur Dee, and the 1652 Theatrum Chemicum Britannicum of Elias Ashmole.

Recent research has revealed that John Dastin lived around 1293–1386. He was born in the village of Greet, in the county of Gloucestershire and was ordained deacon in 1311. He studied at Oxford and was appointed vicar of the church of Bringhurst, Leicestershire. In mid-1317 he traveled to Avignon to work in the service of Cardinal Napoleon Orsini (†1342) and obtained the benefits of a canonry of the collegiate church of Southwell. During his stay in Avignon he was known as "magister Johannes Anglicus." He worked at the court of Napoleon Orsini, and he helped Giovanni Gaetano Orsini during his legacy in Italy (1326–1334). Dastin returned to Oxford in 1341 and was appointed vicar of the Church of Aberford, in Yorkshire, associated with Oriel College.

Once on his land, he was appointed personal secretary to the king to oversee any new mines and precious metals (s.e. thesaurum) found, or produced, in the kingdom of England and the lands of Wales. All the operations of extraction, refining, manufacturing (among which we could include alchemical experiments), as well as their subsequent delivery to the treasury in London, would be done «…according to his discernment and testimony».

Later records identify him with a treasury chaplain at London’s Westminster Church. This indicates his constant link with the royal family, since that place belonged to the jurisdiction of the king and not of a bishop. He died at an earlier date than 1386.

== Works ==
=== Letter to John XXII ===
Dastin argues that artificial transmutation into gold with the help of sulphur of mercury (argent vive) is equivalent to natural transformation. Furthermore, that "art imitates nature, and in certain respects corrects and surpasses it just as infirm nature is changed by the industry of medicine."

=== Rosarius ===
The Rosarius Philosophorum, also known by its incipit Desiderabile desiderium (the desired desire). The Rosarium is known in manuscript and was printed in 1702 by Jean-Jacques Manget in his Bibliotheca Chemica Curiosa.

It was also attributed to Dastin's contemporary Arnaldus de Villa Nova (1238–1311 or 1313) and translated into French under the title La Vraie Pratique de la noble science d'alchimie. Later still it was attributed to Nicolas Flamel under the title The Book of Washing.

=== Visio ===
In manuscripts, this text was often associated with the Visio Edwardi. It was printed for the first time in 1625 under the title Visio Ioannis Dastin. An English translation, Dastin's Dream appeared in Theatrum Chemicum Britannicum of Elias Ashmole, published 1652. Ashmole wrote "I am persuaded. ... Dastin's Dream, has been turned into English Verse by some later Philosopher; for in his days we meet with no such refined English." Dastin presents his Visio Alchimica as the result of a vivid dream, from which he awoke with great joy at all that he had learned. However, the study of the content shows an absolutely conscious and very elaborate attitude in the writing. The entire work is structured following a complex frame armed with sentences taken from alchemical, philosophical, religious, legal and moral texts.

== Manuscripts ==
- Tractatus Joannis Dastin. Cum gauderent uti breuitate Cambridge, Trinity College MS. O.8.36.
- Inc. Ep. Johannis Dastine ad papam Johannem xxii transmissa de alkimia and Visio Joh. Dastin Cambridge, Trinity College MS. O.2.18. 14th and 15th centuries.
- Tractatus Alchemici. De erroribus J. Dastin - British Library MS. Egerton 845. 15th century.
