= Thomas Charnock =

English alchemist

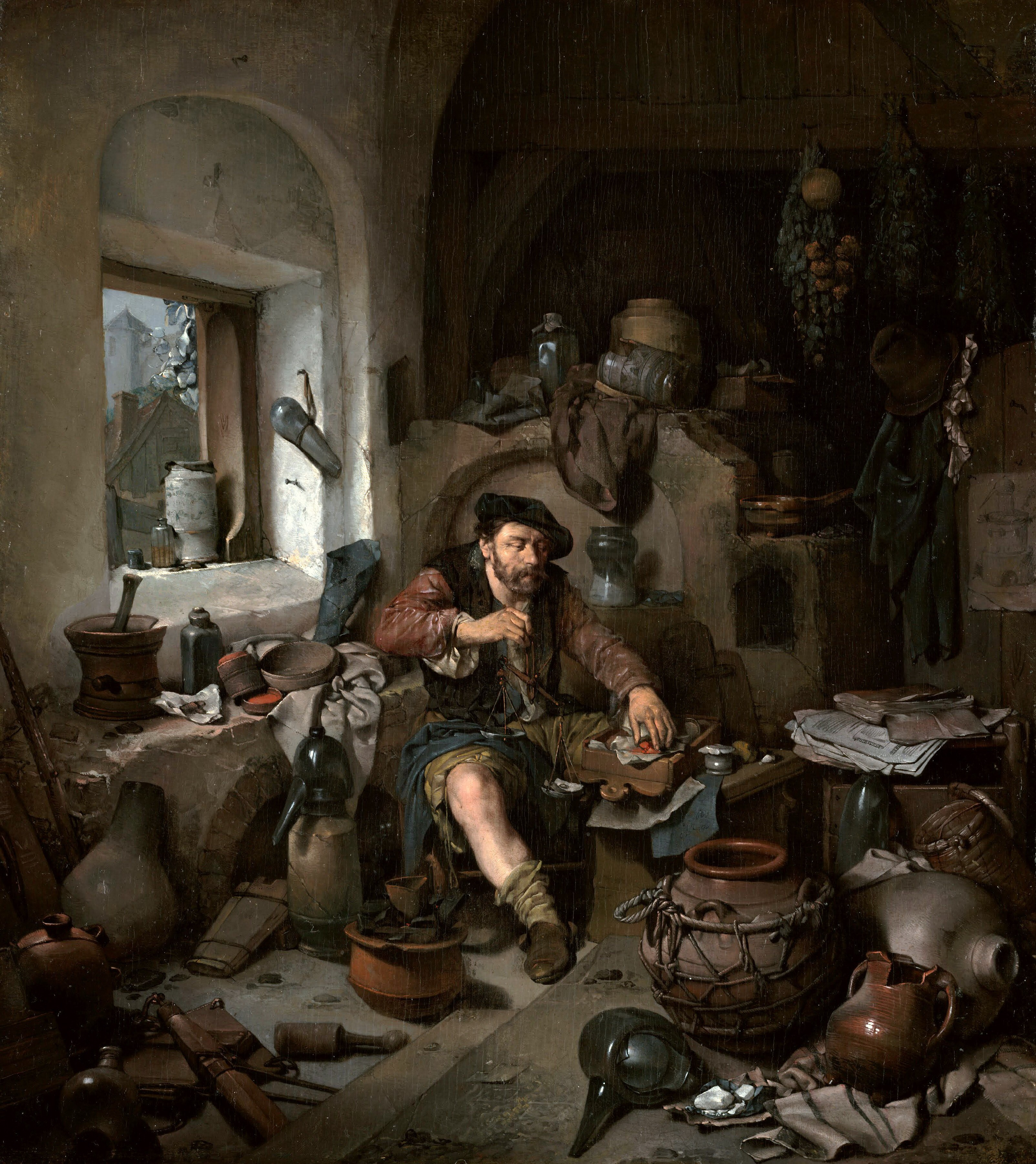
The Alchemist, a 1663 painting by Cornelis Pieterszoon Bega

Thomas Charnock (1524/1526–1581) was an English alchemist and who devoted his life to the quest for the Philosopher's Stone. His unpublished notebooks are useful, not just for an understanding of Elizabethan attitudes towards alchemy in general, but for the insight they give to Charnock's life and thoughts.

== Early life ==
Charnock was born in Faversham, Kent in c.1524. A native of the Isle of Thanet, Charnock spent most of his life in Combwich, a small village on the Steart Peninsula, near Bridgwater in the west of England. Charnock's uncle, also called Thomas Charnock, had been an alchemist, as well as the confessor to Henry VII and his interest in the subject appears to have been stimulated when he inherited his uncle's alchemical library while in his teens.

== Career ==
Charnock began searching for alchemical secrets throughout England in his early twenties. He eventually found two masters who instructed him in the art: 'Master I.S.', a priest from Salisbury; and the former abbot of Bath. His work was tiresome and demanding, requiring him, amongst other things, to keep a fire burning at a constant temperature. He was also pursued by constant bad luck: on New Year's Day 1555, Charnock's tabernacle caught fire and destroyed his progress; inept servants continually spoiled his renewed efforts by mismanaging the fire heating his alchemical vessels; and two years later in 1557 he was conscripted when England went to war with France and the local Justice of the Peace (who seems to have been a personal enemy) made sure that Thomas was forced into military service. In frustration at being conscripted, Charnock smashed his vessels.

Troubled by his continual bad luck, and ostracised by his neighbours who were fearful of his experiments, Charnock vainly asked Elizabeth I to allow him to carry on his experiments in the Tower of London, or another "solitary place." He pledged to give Elizabeth the wealth and health of the philosophers' stone within fourteen years if she would subsidise his costs, promising that he made this offer "uppon payne off losing my hedd."

== Personal life ==
Charnock married Agnes Norden in 1562 at Stockland-Bristol, near Bridgewater, Somersetshire. They had at least two children: Absolon who was buried in Stockland in 1563, and Bridget who married in Stockland in 1587.

Charnock died in April 1581 at Combwich. He was buried in Otterhampton Church, near Bridgwater. After his death, it was reported that no-one would live in his former cottage, which was "troublesome and haunted by spirits and that its owner had a reputation as a troublesome person and a conjurer."

== Works ==
The following works attributed to Charnock were printed in Elias Ashmole's Theatrum Chemicum Britannicum

- Breviary of Philosophy. 1557. An autobiographical account of Charnock's alchemistic experiences
- Aenigma ad Alchimiam. 1572.
- Aenigma de Alchimiae. 1572.
- Fragments coppied From Thomas Charnock's owne hand writing. 1574.
