= Theatrum Chemicum Britannicum =

1652 compilation by Elias Ashmole

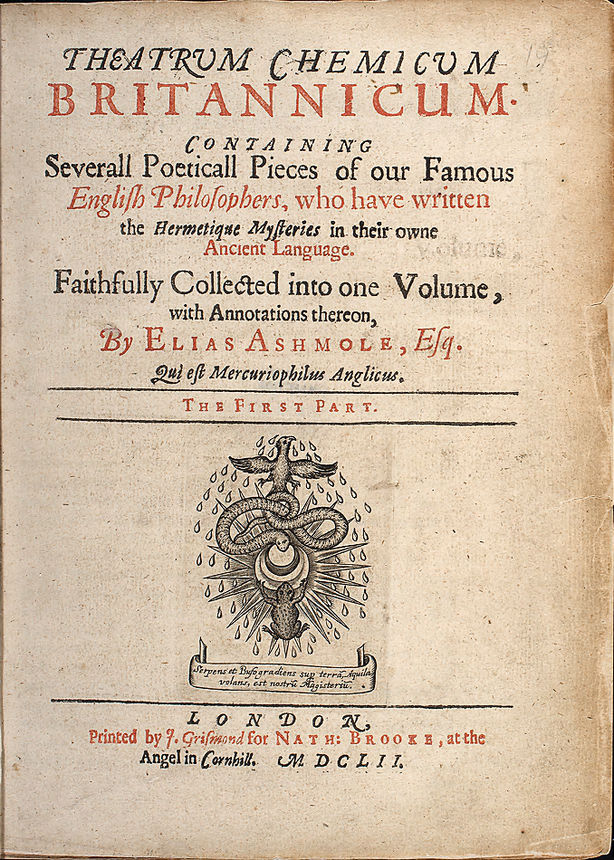
Theatrum Chemicum Britannicum

Theatrum Chemicum Britannicum first published in 1652, is an extensively annotated compilation of English alchemical literature acquired by the English alchemist and antiquarian Elias Ashmole. The book preserved and made available many works that had previously existed only in privately held manuscripts. It is the first part of a planned multi-volume set. It contains the rhyming verse of many alchemists, poets, mathematicians &c, such as Thomas Norton, George Ripley, Geoffrey Chaucer, John Gower, John Dee, Edward Kelley, John Lydgate, John Dastin and William Backhouse.

The quantity of manuscripts acquired by Ashmole was of such a mass, that he planned to publish multiple volumes. The extant 1652 volume, designated as "The First Part" on the title page, was chosen for presenting the works of rhyming Verse, while the Second Part would be given to prose. (Note: Elias Ashmole wanted to ensure readers were aware of more material, already collected and planned for second volume within Theatrum Chemicum Britannicum : "Now for a Particular account, of the Hermetique Science, vouchsafe (Ingenious Reader,) to accept the ensuing Collections, yet not so, as if therein were contained all the Works of our English Hermetique Philosophers, (for more are designed in a Second Part to follow and compleate this a full Theatrum; the which GOD allowing me further Time and Tranquility to run through it, as I have already this, I intend shortly to make ready for the Presse.)) (Note: After describing his process of collecting the English works, Elias Ashmole wrote about his analysis of the material: "I made a Question (in regard some Philosophers had writ in Verse, others in Prose) Which of these should take Precedency; and after some Consideration adjudged it to the Poetique part... it is the Ancientest, Prose but of Latter use with other Nations: but because Poetry hath bin most Anciently used with us, and (as if from a Grant of Nature) held unquestionable... In a word, to prefer Prose before Poetry, is no other, or better, then to let a Rough-hewen-Clowne, take the Wall of a Rich-clad-Lady of Honour : or to Hang a Presence Chamber With Tarpalin, instead of Tapestry.")

In his preface Ashmole says of himself, "I must profess I know enough to hold my tongue, but not enough to speak."

== Contents ==
The volume is described in its preface as: Theatrum Chemicum Britannicum. Containing Severall Poetical Pieces of our Famous English Philosophers, who have written the Hermetique Mysteries in their owne Ancient Language. Faithfully Collected into one Volume, with Annotations thereon, by Elias Ashmole, Esq. Qui est Mercuriophilus Anglicus. The first part, London, Printed by J. Grismond for Nath: Brooke, at the Angel in Cornhill. MDCLII. The compilation contains the following collection of works, several of which are by unknown authors:

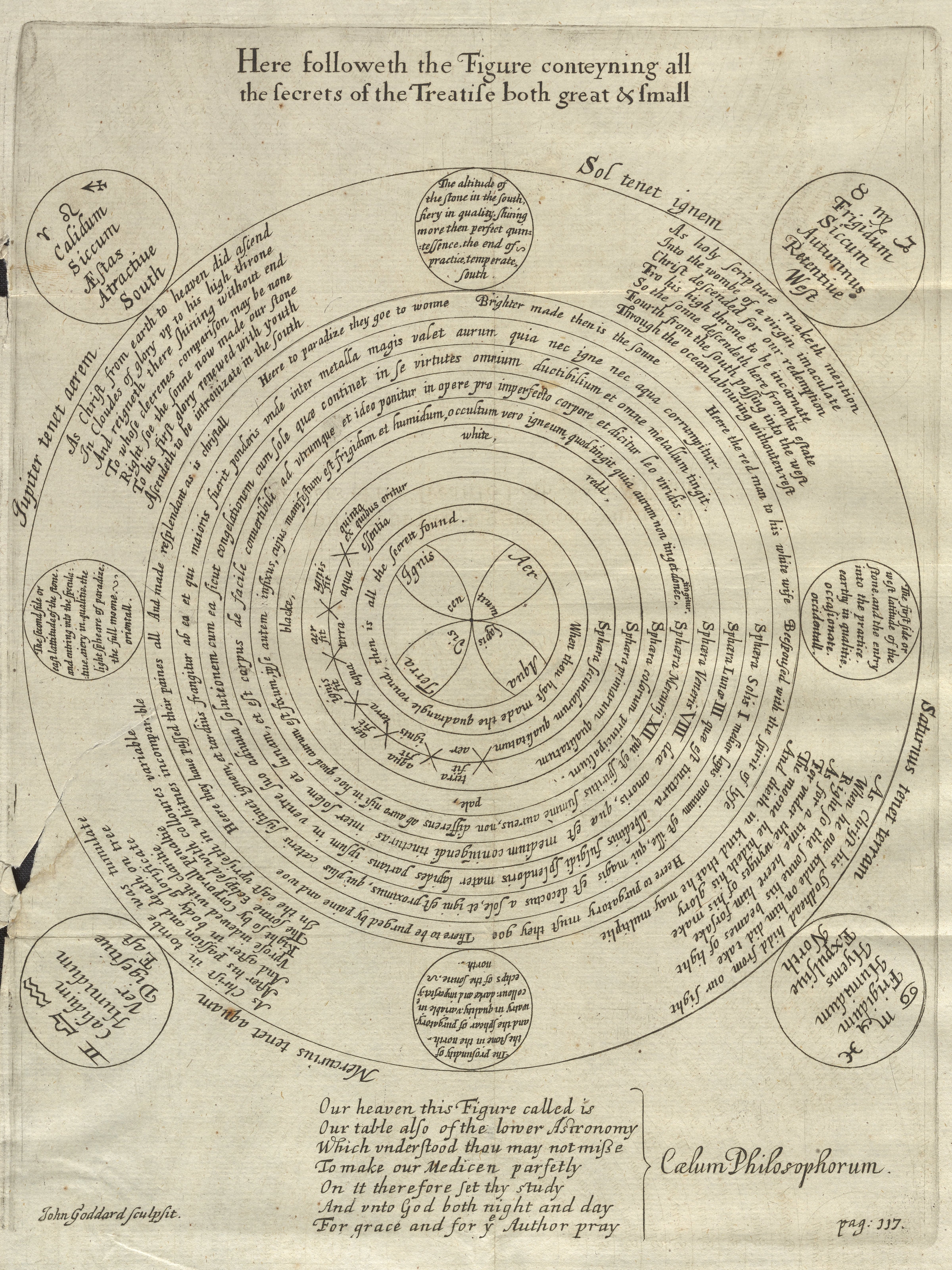
George Ripley's Wheel, from Theatrum Chemicum Britannicum, 1652

- Elias Ashmole. Prologue. January 26, 1652.
- Thomas Norton. The Ordinall of Alchimy.
- George Ripley. The Compound of Alchymie.
- Anonymous. Liber patris sapientiae.
- (Pseudo-) Ramon Lull. Hermes Bird.
- Geoffry Chaucer. The Tale of the Chanans Yeoman.
- John Dastin.The Worke of John Dastin. or Dastin's Dreame.
- Pearce the Black Monke upon the Elixir.
- The Worke of Rich: Carpenter. or Carpenter's Worke
- Abraham Andrews. The Hunting of the Greene Lyon.
- Thomas Charnock. The Breviary of naturall Philosophy. 1557.
- Thomas Charnock. Aenigma ad Alchimiam. 1572.
- Thomas Charnock. Aenigma de Alchimiae. 1572.
- William Bloomefield. Bloomfields Blossoms: or, The Campe of Philosophy.
- Edward Kelley. Sir Edward Kelle's Worke.
- Edward Kelley. Sir Ed: Kelly concerning the Philosophers Stone written to his especiall good Freind, G.S. Gent.
- John Dee. Testamentum Johannis Dee Philosophi summi ad Johannem Gwynn, transmissum 1568.
- Thomas Robinson. Thomas Robinsonus de lapide philosophorum.
- Anonymous. Experience and Philosophy.
- W.B. The Magistery. December, 1633. (Revealed to be by William Backhouse in Ashmole's annotated copy of the book)
- Anonymi: or, severall workes of unknowne Authors.
- John Gower. John Gower concerning the Philosophers Stone.
- George Ripley. The Vision of Sr: George Ripley: Channon of Bridlington.
- George Ripley. Verses belonging to an emblematicall Scrowle: Supposed to be invented by Geo: Ripley.
- George Ripley. The Mistery of alchymists, Composed by Sir Geo: Ripley Chanon of Bridlington.
- George Ripley. The Preface prefixt to Sir Geo: Ripley's Medulla. 1476.
- George Ripley. A shorte worke That beareth the Name of the aforesaid Author, Sir G. Ripley.
- John Lydgate. Translation of the second Epistle that King Alexander sent to his Master Aristotle.
- Anonymi.
- Anonymous. The Hermet's Tale.
- Anonymous. A Discription of the Stone.
- Anonymous. The standing of the Glasse for the tyme of the Putrefaction, and Congelation of the Medicine.
- D.D.W. Bedman. or W. Redman. Aenigma Philosophicum.
- Fragments
  - Thomas Charnock. Fragments coppied From Thomas Charnock's owne hand writing. 1574.
  - In some Coppies I have found these Verses placed before Pearce the Black Monk, upon the Elixir.
  - I have seene an old Coppy of the said work of Pearce the Black Monk, to the end of which these following Verses were joyned.
  - This following Fragment in some copies I have found placed at the end of the aforegoing Exposition of Pearce the Black Monke. A Conclusion.
  - An other Conclusion.
  - The whole Scyence.
- Annotations and Discourses, upon Some part of the preceding Worke.
- A table of the several Treatises, with their Authors Names, contained in this Worke.
- A Table explaining the Obscure, Obsolete, and mis-spell'd words used throughout this Worke.
