= Elias Ashmole =

English antiquarian, politician, officer of arms, astrologer and alchemist

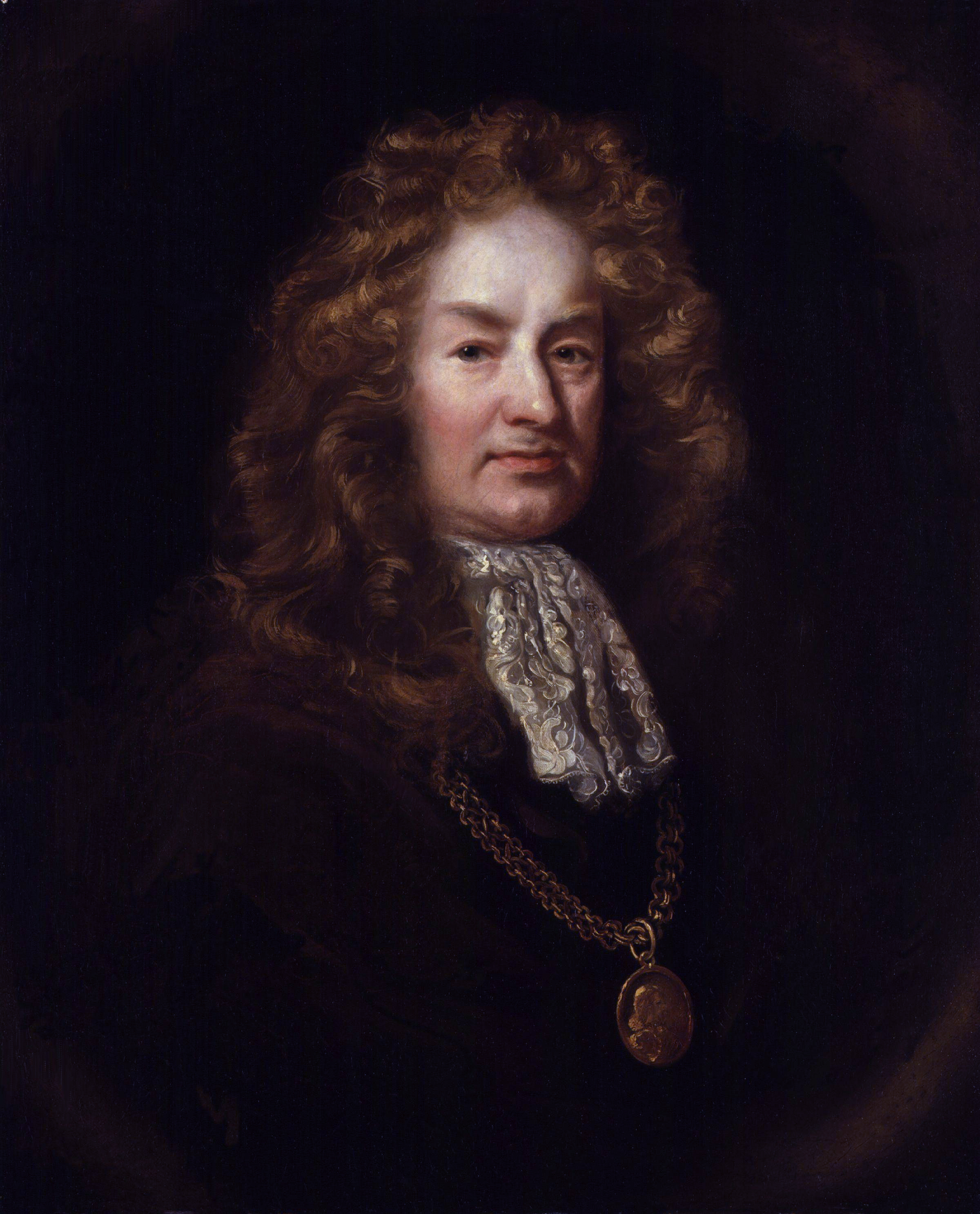
- c. 1688 portrait
- Born: 23 May 1617; Lichfield, Staffordshire
- Died: 18 May 1692 (aged 74); Lambeth, London
- Occupations: Antiquarian, politician, astrologer and alchemist

Elias Ashmole FRS (23 May 1617 – 18 May 1692) was an English antiquary, politician, astrologer and alchemist. Born in Lichfield, Staffordshire, Ashmole fought as a Royalist officer during the English Civil War, serving in the artillery of Lord Astley's regiment at the rank of captain. Following the Stuart Restoration of Charles II in 1660 Ashmole was rewarded with several lucrative offices. In his later years, he collected notes on his life in diary form to serve as source material for a biography. His diary was posthumously published in 1717.

Ashmole was an antiquary with a strong Baconian leaning towards the study of nature. His library reflected his intellectual outlook, including works on English history, law, numismatics, chorography, alchemy, astrology, astronomy and botany. Although he was one of the founding Fellows of the Royal Society, a key institution in the development of experimental science, his interests were antiquarian and mystical as well as scientific. He was an early freemason, although the extent of his involvement and commitment is unclear. Throughout his life he was an avid collector of curiosities and other artefacts. Many of these he acquired from the traveller, botanist and collector John Tradescant the Younger. Ashmole donated most of his collection, his antiquarian library and priceless manuscripts to the University of Oxford to create the Ashmolean Museum, Britain's first public museum.

== Solicitor, royalist and freemason ==
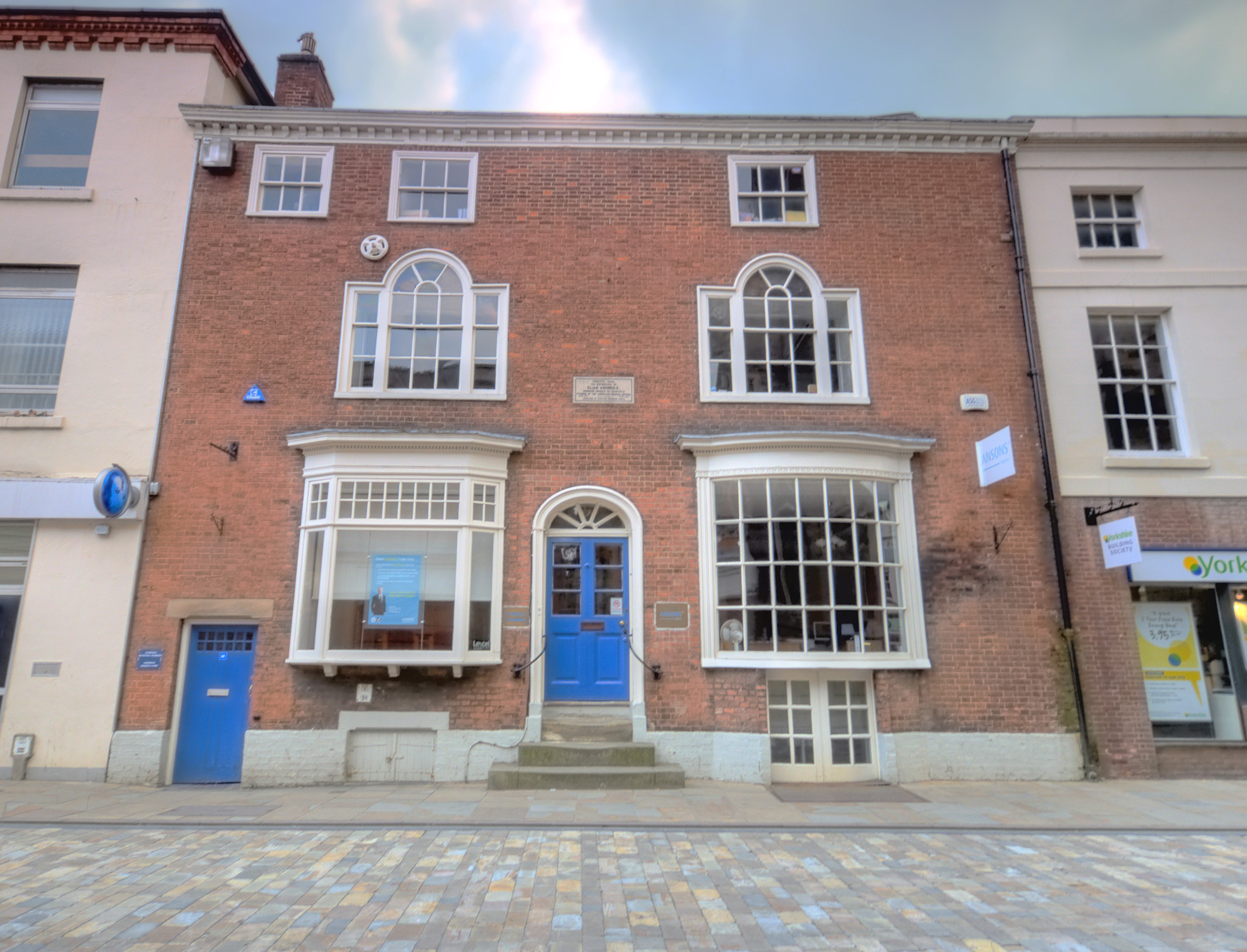
Ashmole's birthplace in Lichfield

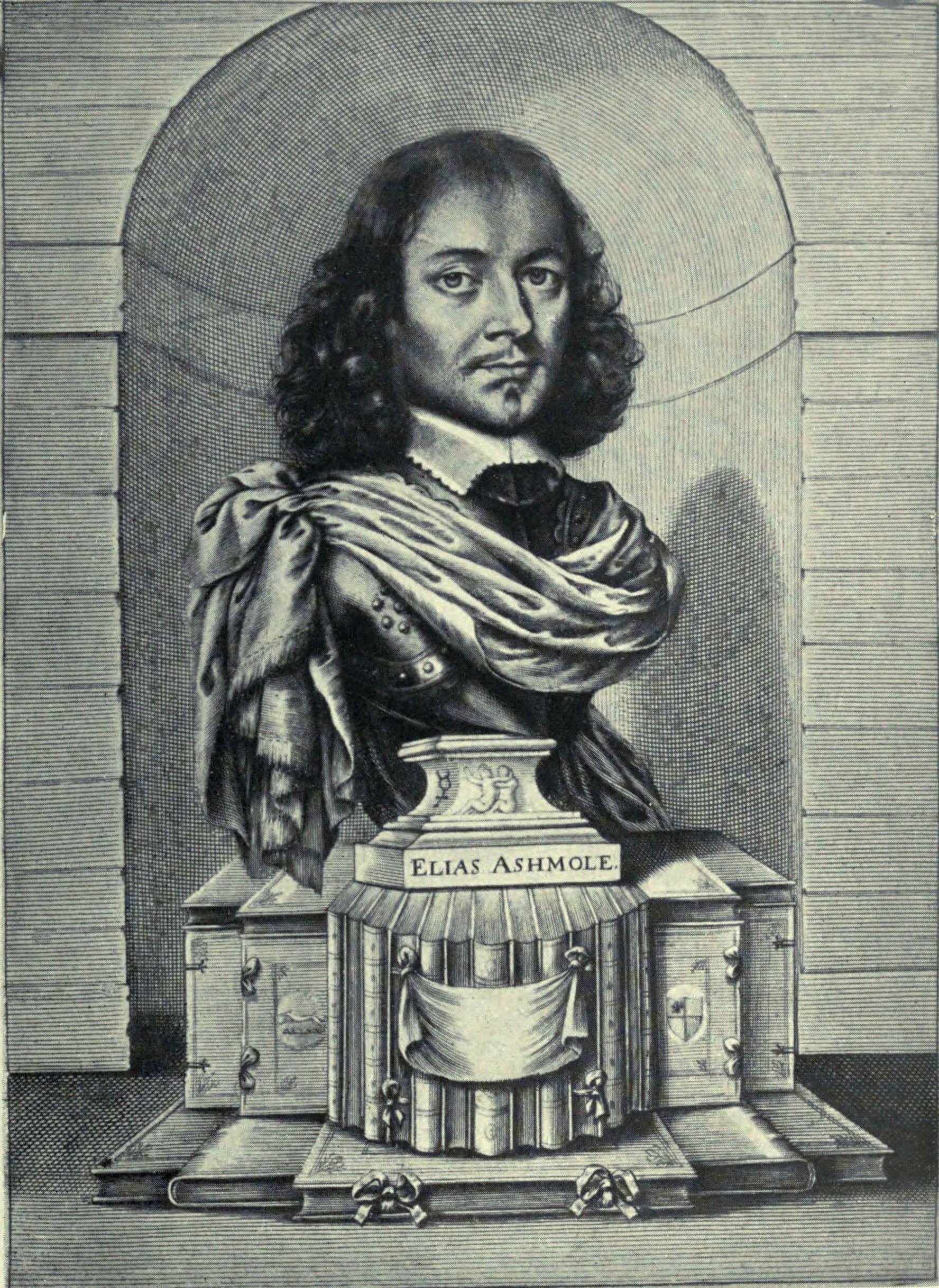
Ashmole by William Faithorne, 1656

Ashmole was born on 23 May 1617 in Breadmarket Street, Lichfield, Staffordshire. His family had been prominent, but their fortunes had declined by the time of Ashmole's birth. His mother, Anne, was the daughter of a wealthy Coventry draper, Anthony Bowyer, and a relative of James Paget, a Baron of the Exchequer. His father, Simon Ashmole, was a saddler who had served as a soldier in Ireland and Europe. Elias attended Lichfield Grammar School (now King Edward VI School) and became a chorister at Lichfield Cathedral. In 1633, he went to live in London as mentor to Paget's sons, and in 1638, with James Paget's help, he qualified as a solicitor. He enjoyed a successful legal practice in London, and married Eleanor Mainwaring, a member of a déclassé Cheshire aristocratic family, who died while pregnant only three years later on 6 December 1641. Still in his early twenties, Ashmole had taken the first steps towards status and wealth. He also became allied with Major-General Charles Worsley, brother-in-law of his sister, Mary Ashmole, who married John Booth of Salford.

Ashmole supported the side of Charles I in the Civil War. At the outbreak of fighting in 1642, he left London for the house of his father-in-law, Peter Mainwaring of Smallwood, Cheshire. There he lived a retired life until 1644, when he was appointed King's Commissioner of Excise at Lichfield. Soon afterwards, at the suggestion of George Wharton, a leading astrologer with strong court connections, Ashmole was given a military post at Oxford, where he served as an ordnance officer for the King's forces. In his spare time, he studied mathematics and physics at his lodgings, Brasenose College. There he acquired a deep interest in astronomy, astrology and magic. In late 1645, he left Oxford to accept the position of Commissioner of Excise at Worcester. He was given the additional military post of captain in Lord Astley's Regiment of Foot, part of the Royalist Infantry, though as a mathematician, he was seconded to artillery positions. He seems never to have participated in any actual fighting.

After the surrender of Worcester to the Parliamentary Forces in July 1646, he retired to Cheshire. Passing through Lichfield on his way there, he learnt that his mother had died just three weeks before from the plague. During this period, he was admitted as a freemason. His diary entry for 16 October 1646 reads in part: "I was made a Free Mason at Warrington in Lancashire, with Coll: Henry Mainwaring of Karincham [Kermincham] in Cheshire." Although there is only one other mention of masonic activity in his diary, he seems to have remained in good standing and well connected with the fraternity as he was still attending meetings in 1682. On 10 March that year he wrote: "About 5 H: P.M. I received a Sumons [sic] to appeare at a Lodge to [be] held the next day, at Masons Hall London." The following day, 11 March 1682, he wrote: "Accordingly, I went ... I was the Senior Fellow among them (it being 35 yeares since I was admitted) ... We all dyned at the halfe Moone Taverne in Cheapeside, at a Noble Dinner prepaired at the charge of the New-accepted Masons." Ashmole's notes are one of the earliest references to Freemasonry known in England, but apart from these entries in his autobiographical notes, there are no further details about his involvement.

== Wealthy collector ==
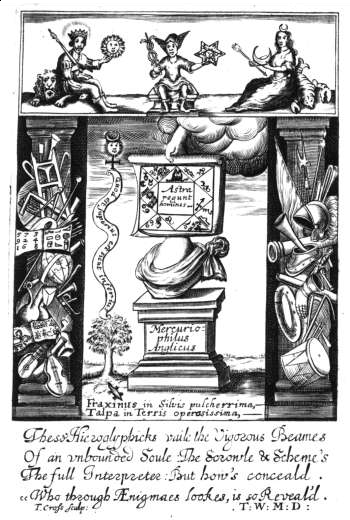
Frontispiece to Ashmole's translation of Fasciculus Chemicus

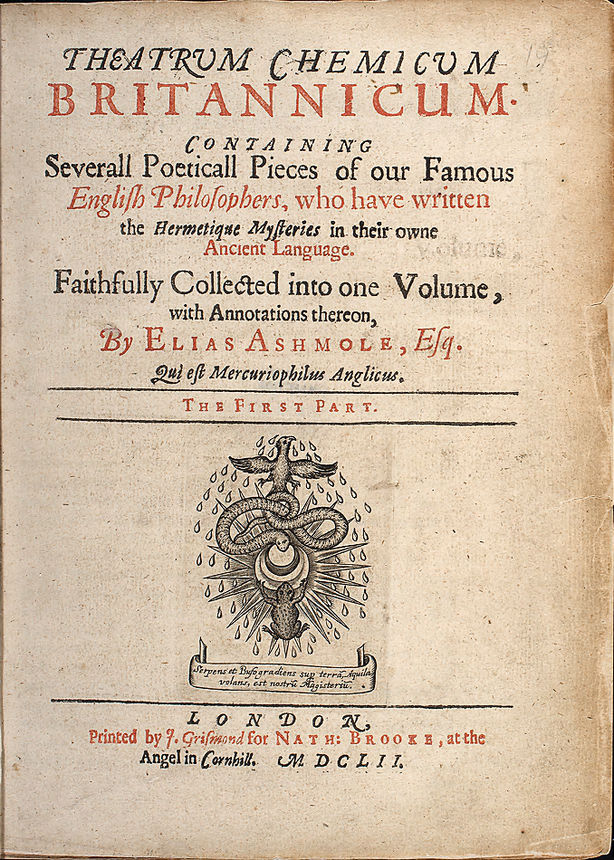
Theatrum Chemicum Britannicum (1652), Ashmole's annotated compilation of alchemical poems in English

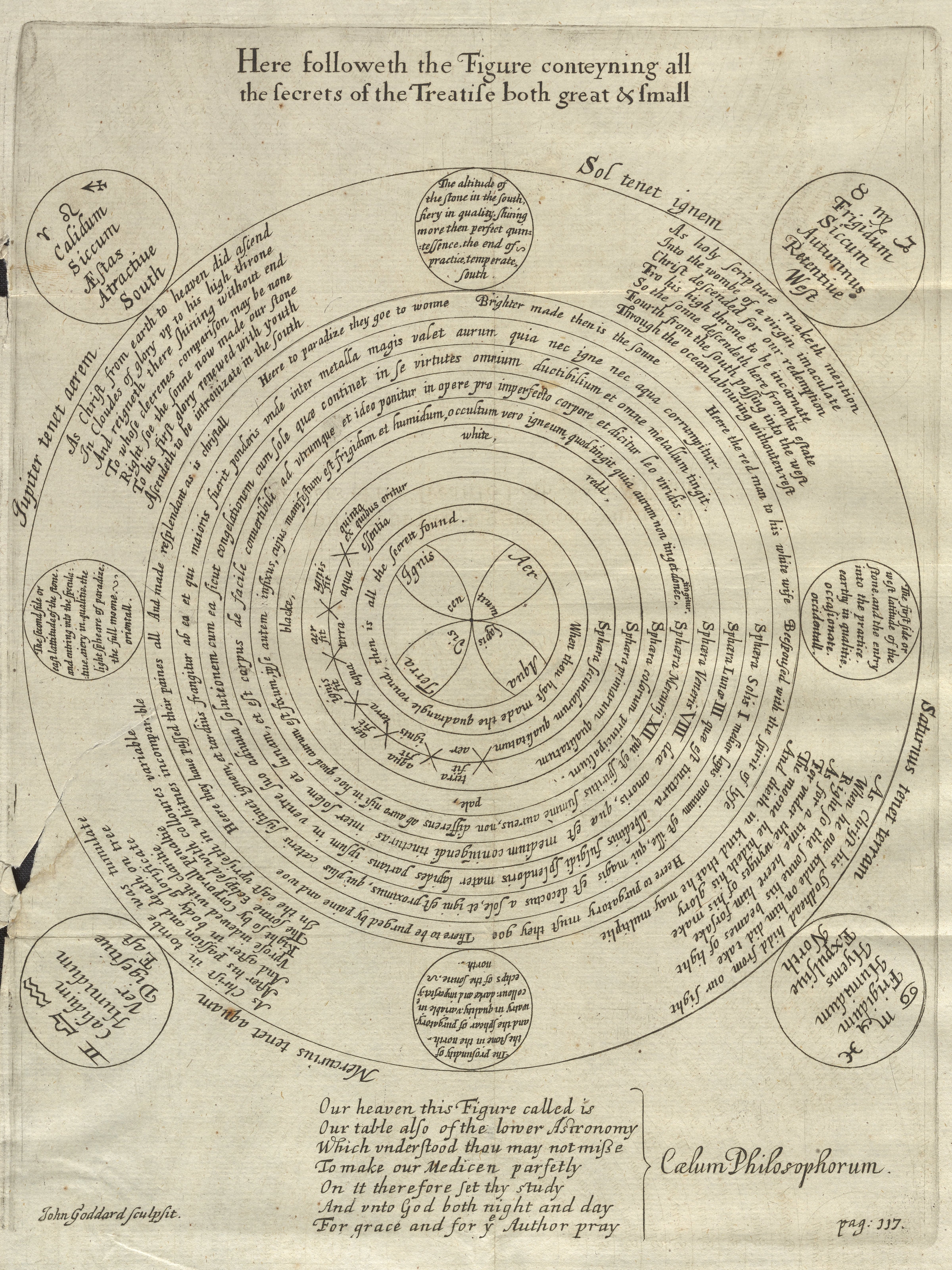
George Ripley's Wheel, from Theatrum Chemicum Britannicum, 1652

In 1646–47, Ashmole made several simultaneous approaches to rich widows in the hope of securing a good marriage. In 1649, he married Mary, Lady Mainwaring (daughter of Sir William Forster of Aldermaston), a wealthy thrice-widowed woman twenty years his senior; she may have been a relative by marriage of his first wife's family and was the mother of grown children. The marriage took place despite the opposition of the bride's family, and it did not prove to be harmonious: Lady Mainwaring filed suit for separation and alimony but it was dismissed by the courts in 1657. Nevertheless, the marriage provided Ashmole with Mary's first husband's estates centred on Bradfield in Berkshire which left him wealthy enough to pursue his interests, including botany and alchemy, without concern for having to earn a living. He arranged for his friend Wharton to be released from prison and appointed him to manage the estates.

During the 1650s, Ashmole devoted a great deal of energy to the study of alchemy. In 1650, he published Fasciculus Chemicus under the anagrammatic pseudonym James Hasolle. This work was an English translation of two Latin alchemical works, one by Arthur Dee, the son of John Dee. In 1652, he published his most important alchemical work, Theatrum Chemicum Britannicum, an extensively annotated compilation of metaphysical poems in English. The book preserved and made available many works that had previously existed only in privately held manuscripts. A corrected edition using Ashmole's two errata sheets and the additional chapter seven of a piece by Thomas Charnock was published in 2011. There is little evidence that Ashmole conducted his own alchemical experiments. He appears to have been a collector of alchemical writings and a student of alchemy rather than an active practitioner. He referred to himself as the son of William Backhouse, who adopted him in 1651 as his spiritual son—for the connection he gave him to the long spiritual chain of hermetic wisdom that Backhouse was part of. According to Ashmole, Backhouse "intytle[d] me to some small parte Of grand sire Hermes wealth [sic]". His final alchemical publication was The Way to Bliss in 1658, but thereafter his interest seems to wane in favour of his other pursuits. Ashmole promoted the use of therapeutic remedies drawing on both Galenic and Paracelsian principles, and his works attempt to merge the two schools. The Way to Bliss recommends ways to prevent illness: a balanced diet, moderate exercise and enough sleep. His works were avidly studied by other natural philosophers, such as Isaac Newton.

Ashmole met the botanist and collector John Tradescant the Younger around 1650. Tradescant had, with his father, built up a vast and renowned collection of exotic plants, mineral specimens and other curiosities from around the world at their house in Lambeth. Ashmole helped Tradescant catalogue his collection in 1652, and, in 1656, he financed the publication of the catalogue, the Musaeum Tradescantianum. In 1659, Tradescant, who had lost his only son seven years earlier, legally deeded his collection to Ashmole. Under the agreement, Ashmole would take possession at Tradescant's death. When Tradescant died in 1662, his widow, Hester, contested the deed, claiming her husband had signed it when drunk without knowing its contents, but the matter was settled in Chancery in Ashmole's favour two years later. Hester was to hold the collection in trust for Ashmole until her death. Ashmole's determined aggressiveness in obtaining the Tradescant collection for himself has led some scholars to consider that Ashmole was an ambitious, ingratiating social climber who stole a hero's legacy for his own glorification.

== Restoration ==
Ashmole embarked on further catalogues, including one of the Roman coin collection of the Bodleian Library, which he finally completed in 1666 after eight years of work. It may have taken so long because Ashmole's progress was interrupted by the Restoration of Charles II in 1660, when Ashmole's loyalty was richly rewarded with political offices. He was appointed Secretary and Clerk of the Courts of Surinam and Comptroller of the White Office. While these two titles do not seem to have provided either an income or any specific duties, he also became Commissioner and then Comptroller for the Excise in London, and later was made the Accountant-General of the Excise, a position that made him responsible for a large portion of the King's revenue. These latter posts yielded him considerable income as well as considerable power of patronage.

The King commissioned Ashmole to prepare a catalogue of the coins and medals held in the Royal Collection, and appointed him to lead a commission responsible for tracing items from the collection which had been dispersed or sold by the parliamentary regime. Ashmole also appears to have been involved in the organisation of the coronation, or at least set himself up as an expert upon it.

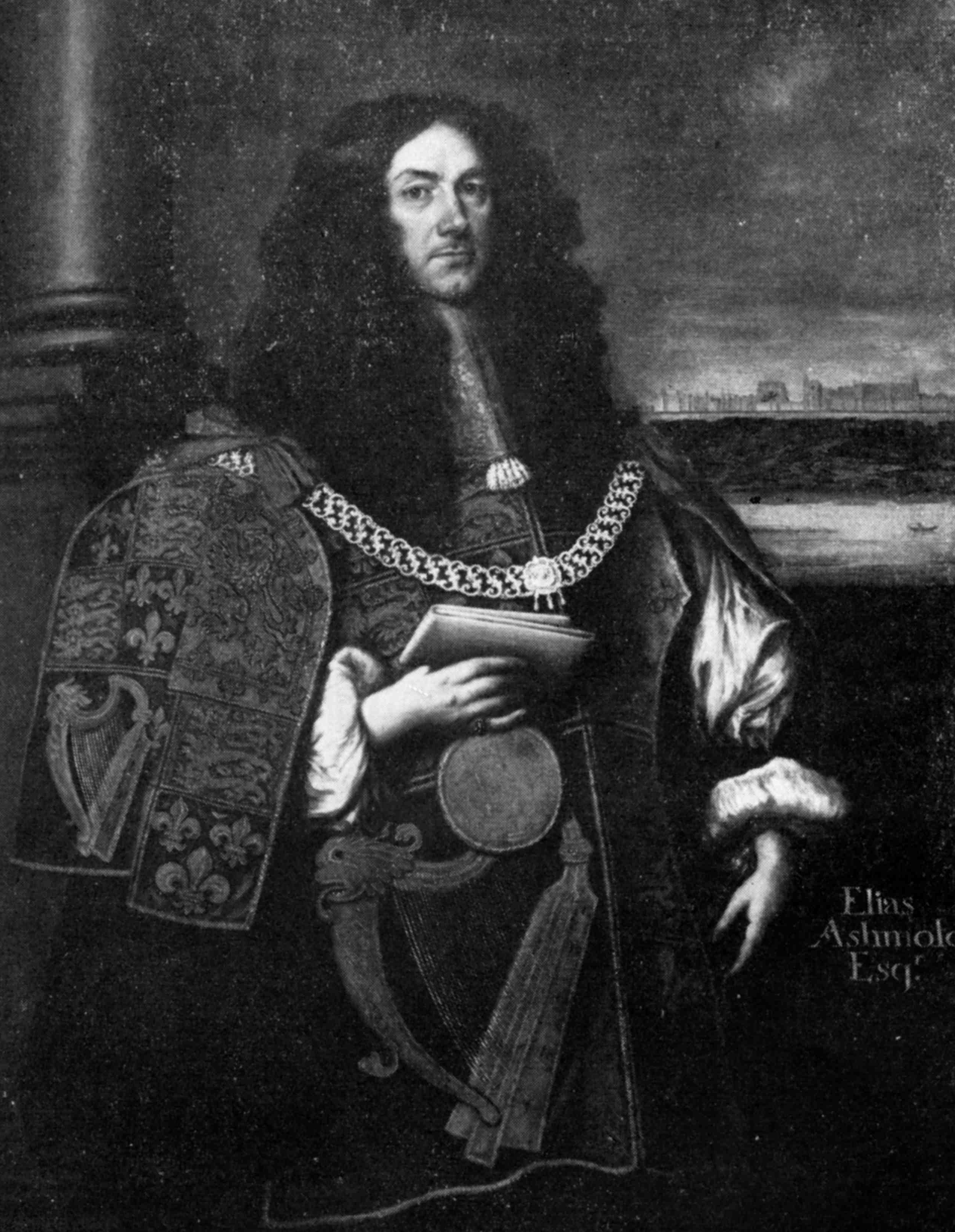
Elias Ashmole wearing a tabard as Windsor Herald, painted by Cornelis de Neve in 1664

Ashmole became one of the founding Fellows of the Royal Society in 1661, but he was not very active in the society. His most significant appointment was to the College of Arms as Windsor Herald of Arms in Ordinary in June 1660. In this position he devoted himself to the study of the history of the Order of the Garter, which had been a special interest of his since the 1650s, and he proposed a design for the Royal Society's coat of arms.

By 1665, he was collecting information for his county history, The Antiquities of Berkshire; and in 1672 he published The Institution, Laws and Ceremonies of the Most Noble Order of the Garter, a lavish folio with illustrations by Wenceslaus Hollar, for which he had conducted years of research. An earlier attempt to promote himself as the official historiographer of the order had failed but this work firmly established Ashmole as an expert. He had written a large part of it in 1665 while living in the country to escape the Great Plague which was then raging in London. Presentation copies sent to the foreign members of the order were reciprocated by gifts of gold insignia from the King of Denmark, the Elector of Brandenburg and the Elector Palatine. Ashmole performed the heraldic and genealogical work of his office scrupulously, and he was considered a leading authority on court protocol and ceremony.

On 1 April 1668, Lady Mainwaring died, and on 3 November the same year Ashmole married Elizabeth Dugdale (1632–1701), the much younger daughter of his friend and fellow herald, the antiquarian Sir William Dugdale. All of Elizabeth's pregnancies ended in stillbirths or miscarriages, and Ashmole remained childless. In 1675, he resigned as Windsor Herald, perhaps because of factional strife within the College of Arms. He was offered the post of Garter Principal King of Arms, which traditionally came with a knighthood, but he turned it down in favour of Dugdale.

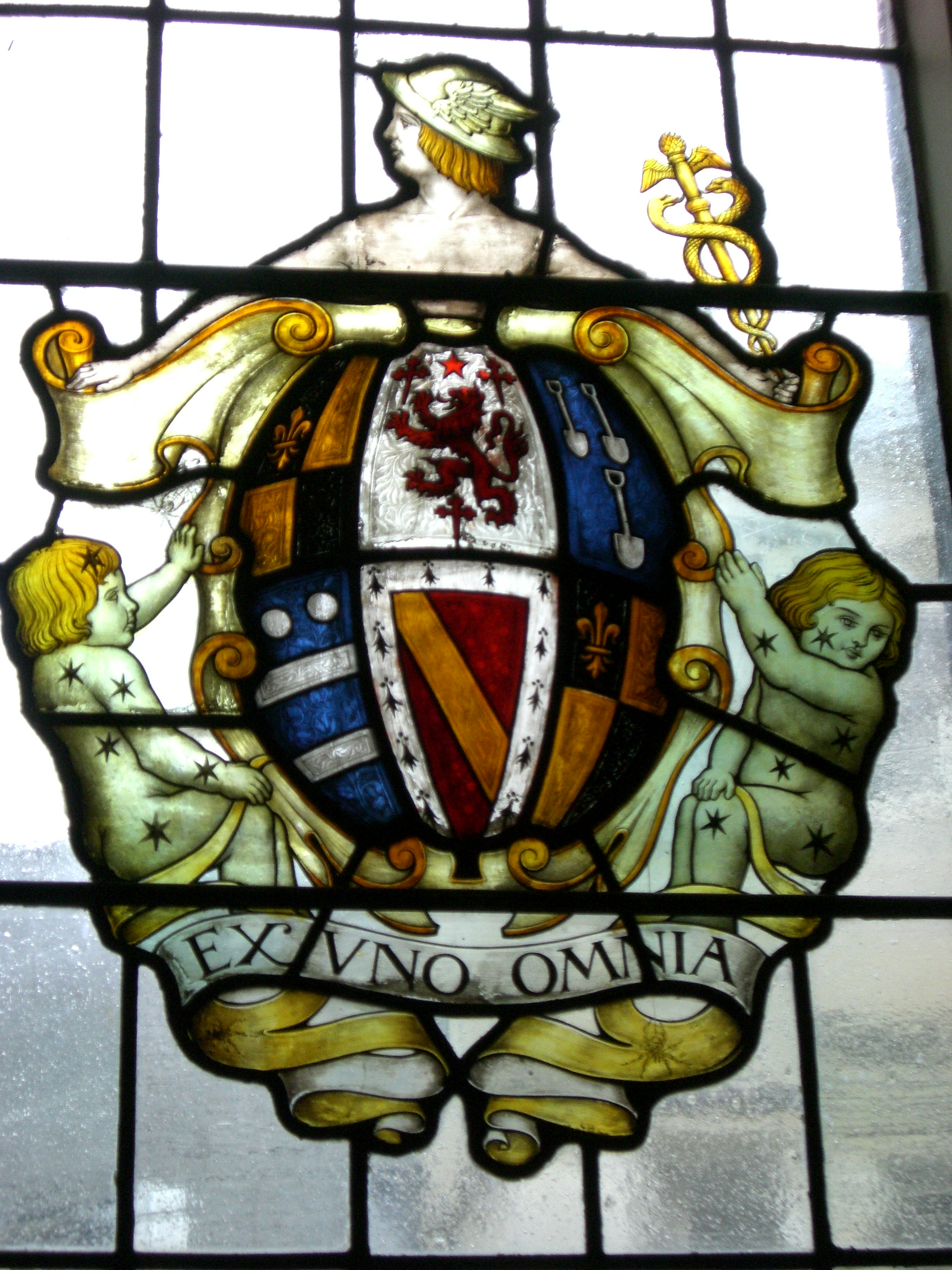
Ashmole's coat of arms is here shown in the first and last quarters of the shield. His crest placed the god Mercury between the twin constellation of Gemini (here used as supporters).

Ashmole possessed his own coat of arms, claimed by descent from armigerous ancestors, and described in heraldic blazon as Quarterly Gules and Or, in the first quarter a Fleur de lis Argent, with a Greyhound courant for the crest. After the Restoration, Ashmole was granted a new crest in place of the greyhound, one which reflected his interest in astrology: On a wreath Sable and Or the Planet Mercury collocated in the middle of the caelestiall Signe Gemini Proper, his right hand extended toward Heaven and left holding a caducan Rod Or. The new grant also altered the tinctures of his arms to Quarterly Sable and Or, in the first quarter a Fleur de lis of the second.

The Restoration led to the re-establishment of the Church of England, and Ashmole presented new prayer books to Lichfield Cathedral. In 1684, Dugdale wrote to his son-in-law that "the vulgar sort of people" were not "yet weaned from the presbyterian practises, which was long prayers of their own devising, and senseless sermons". Like many royalists, Ashmole's circle was contemptuous of non-conformity. Though Ashmole was "one of the earliest Freemasons, [and] appears from his writings to have been a zealous Rosicrucian", John Gadbury wrote that "Anthony Wood hath falsely called him a Rosicrucian, Whereas no man was further from fostring such follies." Ashmole's involvement with Freemasonry and Rosicrucianism may have been social or the interest of an antiquarian, rather than born out of any religious fervour. However, the notion of a repository of universal knowledge is described in Rosicrucian writings and this idea may have partly inspired Ashmole's desire to found a great museum.

== Ashmolean Museum ==
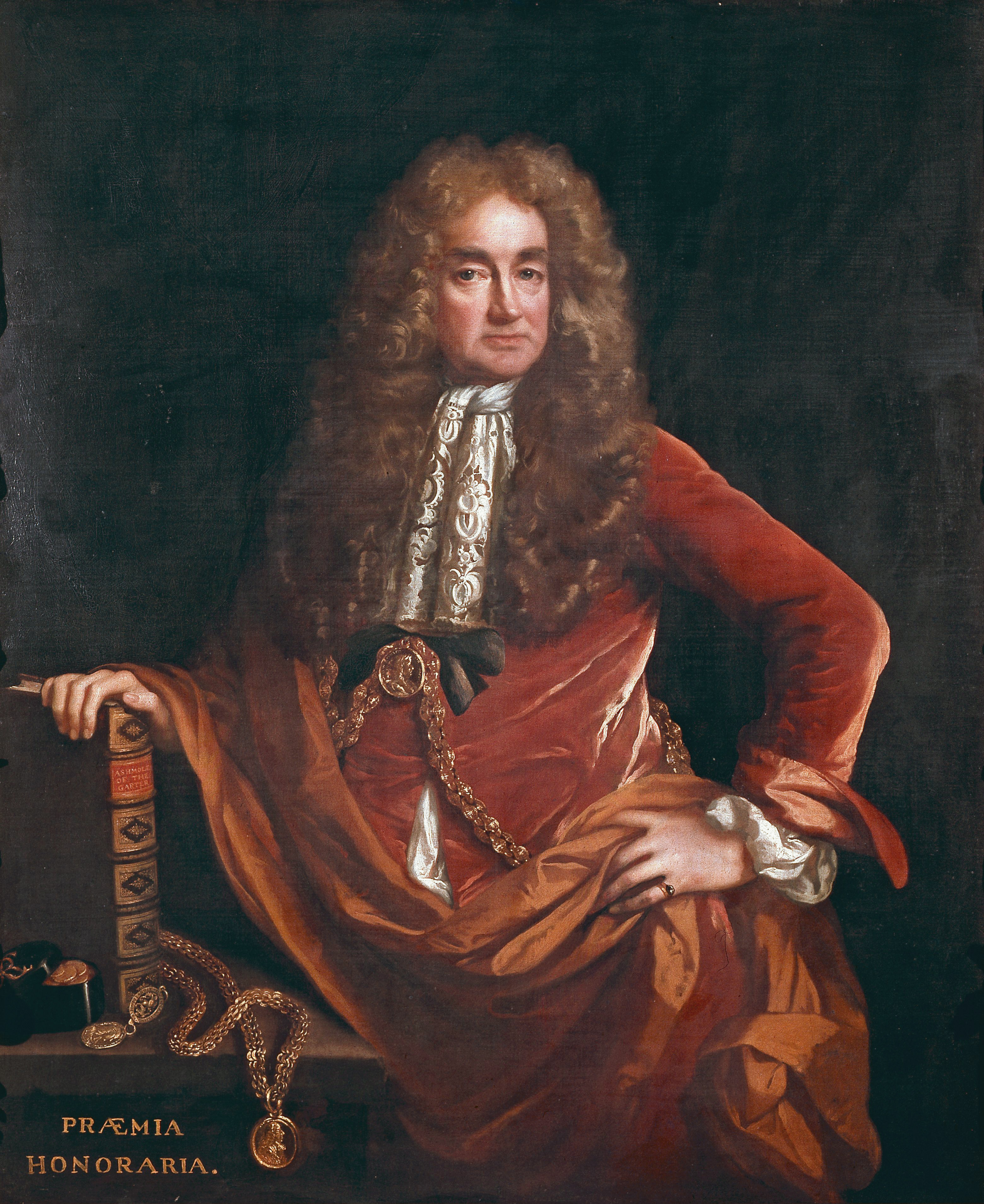
Elias Ashmole by John Riley, c. 1683

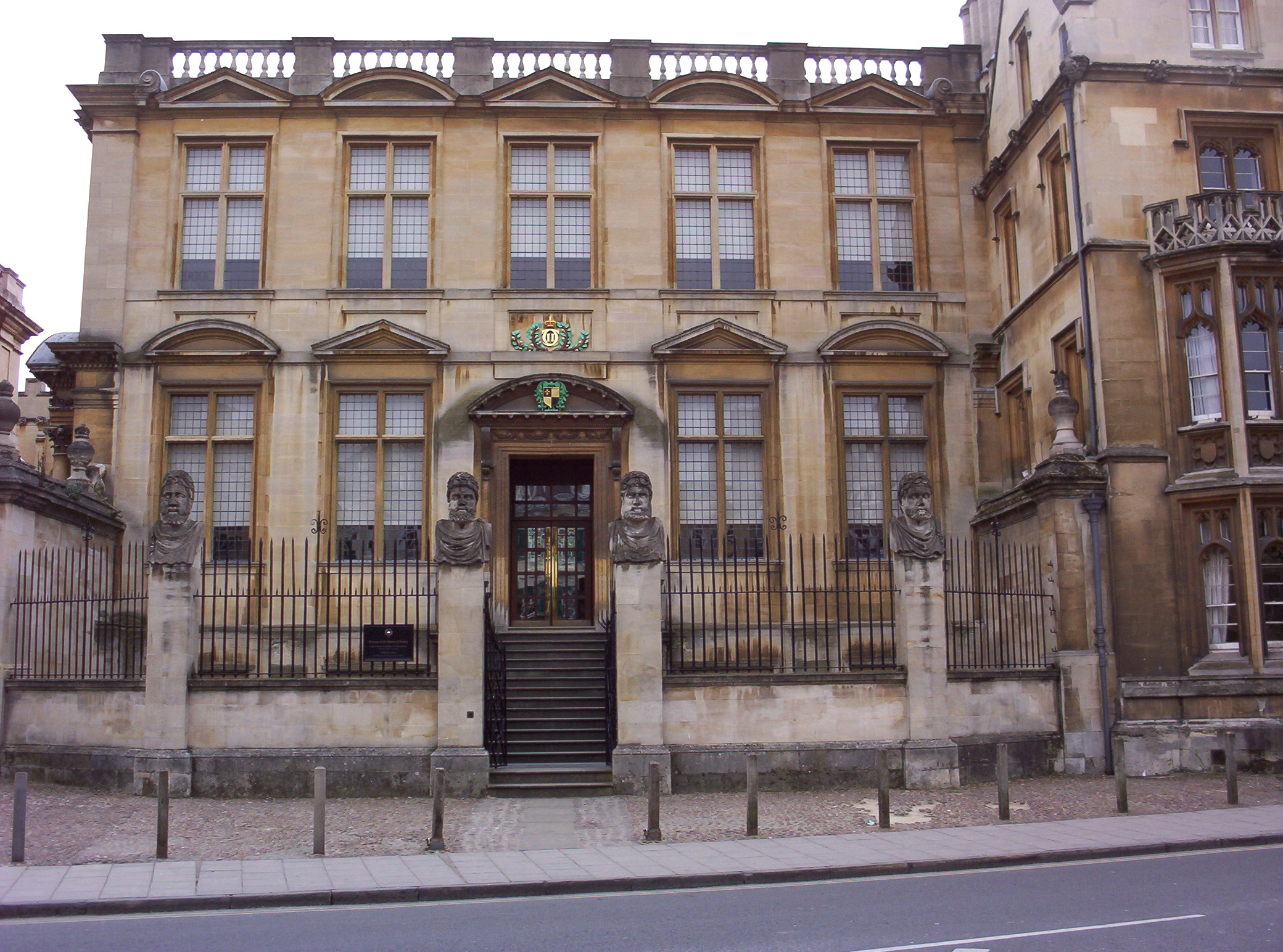
The Old Ashmolean Building, now the History of Science Museum, Oxford

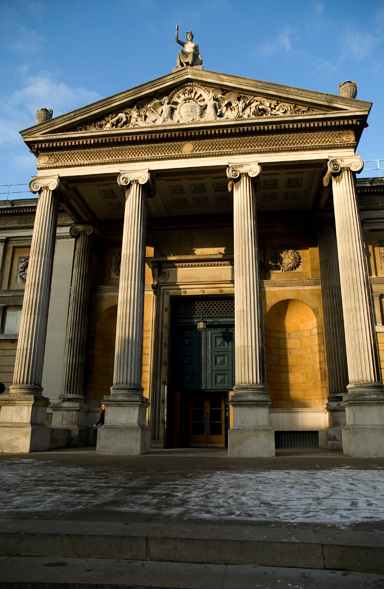
The main entrance of the current Ashmolean Museum building

In 1669, Ashmole received a Doctorate in Medicine from the University of Oxford. He maintained his links with the University and, in 1677, Ashmole made a gift of the Tradescant Collection, together with material he had collected independently, to the University on the condition that a suitable home be built to house the materials and make them available to the public. Ashmole had already moved into the house adjacent to the Tradescants' property in 1674 and had already removed some items from their house into his. In 1678, in the midst of further legal wrangling over the Tradescant Collection, Hester was found drowned in a garden pond. By early 1679, Ashmole had taken over the lease of the Tradescant property and began merging his and their collections into one. The Ashmolean Museum was completed in 1683, and is considered by some to be the first truly public museum in Europe. According to Anthony Wood, the collection filled twelve wagons when it was transferred to Oxford. It would have been more, but a large part of Ashmole's own collection, destined for the museum, including antiquities, books, manuscripts, prints, and 9,000 coins and medals, was destroyed in a disastrous fire in the Middle Temple on 26 January 1679. As a result of the fire, the proportion of the collection derived from the Tradescants was larger than originally anticipated and in the opinion of Professor Michael Hunter this misfortune has contributed to criticisms that Ashmole took an unfair share of the credit in assembling the collection at the expense of the Tradescants.

In 1678, Ashmole stood as a candidate in a by-election for the Lichfield borough parliamentary constituency caused by the death of one of the two incumbent members. During Ashmole's campaign his cousin, Thomas Smalridge, who was acting as a kind of campaign manager, fell ill and died. Ashmole did not visit the constituency, and, as Ashmole's own horoscope had predicted, he lost the election. He also put himself forward as a candidate in the general election of 1685. Surviving documents indicate that he was the most popular candidate, but after King James II requested he stand down (in an age when monarchs were likely to interfere with parliamentary elections), Ashmole did so. On election day, all the votes cast for Ashmole, instead of being declared invalid, were declared as votes for the King's candidate, and only as a result of this ruse was the candidate favoured by the Court (Richard Leveson) elected.

Ashmole's health began to deteriorate during the 1680s. He continued to hold his excise office throughout the reign of James II and after the Glorious Revolution until his death but became much less active in its affairs. His home cures included hanging three spiders around his neck which "drove my Ague away". He began to collect notes on his life in diary form to serve as source material for a biography; although the biography was never written, these notes are a rich source of information on Ashmole and his times. He died at his house in Lambeth on 18 May 1692, and was buried at St. Mary's Church, Lambeth on 26 May. Ashmole bequeathed the remainder of his collection and library to Oxford for the Ashmolean Museum. Two-thirds of his library now resides in the Bodleian at Oxford; its separation from the museum collection in the Victorian era contributed to the belief that Ashmole designed the museum around the Tradescant collection, rather than his own. Ashmole's books can often be identified by the presence of his signature on the titlepages.

Ashmole's widow, Elizabeth, married a stonemason, John Reynolds, on 15 March 1694. They had no children and on her death seven years later the house and lands in Lambeth passed into Reynolds's hands.

== Assessment by biographers ==
Vittoria Feola, in her monograph Elias Ashmole and the Uses of Antiquity (Paris, 2013), has described Ashmole as an antiquary first and foremost, who understood the value of the New Science, which he promoted through his Museum. Feola, however, has warned that antiquity was Ashmole's greatest passion, as well as his main tool for self-fashioning. Michael Hunter, in his entry on Ashmole for the Oxford Dictionary of National Biography, concluded that the most salient points of Ashmole's character were his ambition and his hierarchical vision of the world—a vision that unified his royalism and his interests in heraldry, genealogy, ceremony, and even astrology and magic. He was as successful in his legal, business and political affairs as he was in his collecting and scholarly pursuits.

His antiquarian work is still considered valuable, and his alchemical publications, especially the Theatrum Chemicum Britannicum (1652), preserved many works that might otherwise have been lost. He formed several close and long-lasting friendships, with the astrologer William Lilly for example, but, as Richard Garnett observed, "acquisitiveness was his master passion".

William Gifford said of Ashmole's judgement that, "he had none."

== Bibliography ==
- 1652 – Theatrvm Chemicvm Britannicum, containing severall poeticall pieces of our famous English philosophers, who have written the hermetique mysteries in their owne ancient language
- 1658 – The Way to Bliss: in three books
- 1660 – Sol in ascendente: or, the glorious appearance of Charles the Second
- 1664–1666 – The Visitation of Berkshire, 1664–1666
- 1715 – The History of the Most Noble Order of the Garter. Wherein is set forth an account of the town, castle, chappel, and college of Windsor; ... To which is prefix'd, a discourse of knighthood in general, ...
- 1717 – Memoirs of the Life of that Learned Antiquary, Elias Ashmole, Esq; drawn up by himself by way of diary. With an appendix of original letters
- 1736 – The History and Antiquities of Berkshire. With a large appendix ... ; To which will be added the life of the author
- 1761 – The Entire Ceremonies of the Coronations of His Majesty King Charles II. and of Her Majesty Queen Mary, Consort to James II. As published by those learned heralds Ashmole and Sandford. With the prayers at full length. To which is prefix'd, an introduction historical and critical; likewise an appendix, containing many curious particulars
- 1774 – The Lives of those Eminent Antiquaries Elias Ashmole, Esquire, and Mr. William Lilly, written by themselves; containing, first, William Lilly's History of his life and times, with notes, by Mr. Ashmole: secondly, Lilly's life and death of Charles the First
