= Pseudo-Democritus =

Anonymous author(s) of works falsely attributed to Democritus

Pseudo-Democritus is the name used by scholars for the anonymous authors of a number of Greek writings that were falsely attributed to the pre-Socratic philosopher Democritus (c. 460–370 BC).

Several of these writings, most notably the lost works On Sympathies and Antipathies and Artificial Substances (Greek: Cheirokmēta), were probably written by the Pythagorean physician and pharmacologist Bolos of Mendes (fl. 3rd or 2d century BC).

There are also a number of extant Greek alchemical writings attributed to Democritus, whose author has sometimes likewise been identified as Bolos of Mendes, but who is now thought to have been an anonymous author active during the second half of the first century AD, most likely c. 54–68 AD. These writings are some of the oldest alchemical works in existence, and have played an important role in defining alchemy as a discipline. In their original form, they probably consisted of a series of four books on dyeing: two books on dyeing metals gold and silver, one on dyeing stones, and one on dyeing wool purple. They were highly regarded by later Greek alchemists, who cited them frequently and even wrote a number of commentaries on them.

The alchemical works of pseudo-Democritus are also responsible for popularizing the aphorism attributed to the legendary Persian alchemist Ostanes, Nature delights in nature, nature conquers nature, nature masters nature, which went on to become an often repeated quote among later alchemists.

== Four Books ==
The original alchemical works attributed to Democritus, known as the Four Books, are now lost. However, several epitomized extracts of them survive in two extant treatises called Natural and Secret Questions (Greek: Physika kai Mystika) and On the Making of Silver (Greek: Peri asēmou poiēseōs), as well as in a collection of lists of alchemical substances called Catalogues (Greek: Katalogoi). The original books dealt with a wide range of topics, including the transmutation of base metals into silver or gold, the artificial production of precious stones, and the purple-dyeing of wool, all of which are subjects also covered in the Stockholm and Leyden papyri (3rd century AD). However, the preserved parts focus more strongly on the production of silver and gold, thus reflecting the main interests of later Greek alchemists.

The original works were probably four books on dyeing: one on how to give base metals a yellow tinge (i.e., to 'dye' them gold), one on how to give base metals a white tinge (i.e., to 'dye' them silver), one on 'dyeing' stones (i.e., to create precious stones), and one on dyeing fabrics purple (using cheaper substitutes for the costly Tyrian purple).

== Historical significance ==
The Four Books are some of the most ancient works known in Western alchemy, and played a central role in its earliest development. They were frequently cited by alchemists such as Zosimos of Panopolis (fl. c. 300 AD) and Synesius (c. 373–414 AD), as well as by later Byzantine writers such as pseudo-Olympiodorus, Stephanus, Christianus, and 'the philosopher Anonymous'. Their authority among later Greek alchemists was such that the latter often presented their own theories and practices as an interpretation of the Four Books.

Some Greek alchemists also wrote commentaries on the Four Books. One such commentary, called Democritean Commentaries and written by the alchemist Petasius, is now lost. However, another commentary, called The Philosopher Synesius to Dioscorus: Notes on Democritus' Book, is still extant.

=== Nature delights in nature ===
One aphorism that is often repeated throughout the Four Books, and often quoted by later writers, is as follows:

Greek: ῾Η φύσις τῇ φύσει τέρπεται, καὶ ἡ φύσις τὴν φύσιν νικᾷ, καὶ ἡ φύσις τὴν φύσιν κρατεῖ (Hē physis tēi physei terpetai, kai hē physis tēn physin nikai, kai hē physis tēn physin kratei)

Translation: Nature delights in nature, nature conquers nature, nature masters nature

Ascribed in the narrative of the Four Books to pseudo-Democritus' legendary Persian master Ostanes, it is supposed to summarize the entire teaching of Ostanes to pseudo-Democritus, encapsulating the fundamental rules by which the elements or natures of things combine. This aphorism, which also occurs in a number of earlier Hellenistic writings dealing with the concepts of sympathy and antipathy, links the pseudo-Democritean writings back to earlier works attributed to 'Persian' authors such as pseudo-Zoroaster and Ostanes, as well as to the works of Bolos of Mendes.

== Works cited ==
- Fraser, Peter M. (1972). Ptolemaic Alexandria. Vol. I–III. Oxford: Oxford University Press. ISBN 9780198142782.
- Hershbell, Jackson P. (1987). "Democritus and the Beginnings of Greek Alchemy". Ambix. 34 (1): 5–20. doi:10.1179/amb.1987.34.1.5.
- Holmyard, Eric J. (1957). Alchemy. Harmondsworth: Penguin Books. OCLC 2080637.
- Irby-Massie, Georgia L.; Keyser, Paul T. (2002). Greek Science of the Hellenistic Era: A Sourcebook. London and New York: Taylor & Francis Routledge. ISBN 9780415238472.
- Kroll, Wilhelm (1934). "Bolos und Demokritos". Hermes. 69 (2): 228–232.
- Letrouit, Jean (1995). "Chronologie des alchimistes grecs". In Kahn, Didier; Matton, Sylvain (eds.). Alchimie: art, histoire et mythes. Actes du I" Colloque international de la Société d'Étude de l'Histoire de l'Alchimie. Paris and Milan: S.É.H.A and Arche. pp. 11–93. ISBN 9788872521786.
- Lindsay, Jack (1970). The Origins of Alchemy in Graeco-Roman Egypt. New York: Barnes & Noble. ISBN 9780389010067.
- Martelli, Matteo (2013). The Four Books of Pseudo-Democritus. Sources of Alchemy and Chemistry: Sir Robert Mond Studies in the History of Early Chemistry (Ambix, vol. 60, suppl. 1). Leeds: Maney Publishing/Society for the History of Alchemy and Chemistry. ISBN 9781909662285.
- Multhauf, Robert P. (1966). The Origins of Chemistry. London: Oldbourne. OCLC 977570829.
- Wellmann, Max (1928). "Die Physika des Bolos Demokritos und der Magier Anaxilaos aus Larissa". Abhandlungen der Preussischen Akademie der Wissenschaften, philosophisch-historische Klasse. 7. OCLC 10314574.
