= Moses of Alexandria =

Early alchemist

Moses of Alexandria, often known simply as Moses or Moses the Alchemist, was an early alchemist who wrote Greek alchemical texts around the first or second century. He has also been called "Moses the thrice happy". The author of these alchemical texts was likely Jewish, since his writings show traces of Jewish monotheism and other Jewish beliefs.

Moses the alchemist is often conflated with the biblical Moses. The opening passage of his work is an altered version of the Book of Exodus 31: 2–5. In antiquity, the biblical Moses was believed to be the founder of the arts and sciences including philosophy and medicine. Magical papyri were also attributed to him.

The works attributed to Moses of Alexandria include alchemical prescriptions for the treatment of mercury, copper, arsenic, the distillation of water, and instructions for chrysopoeia.

== Works ==
- Μωσεως διπλωσις (The Domestic Chemistry of Moses)
- Ευποια και ευτυχια του κτισαμενου και επιτυχια καματου και μακροχρονια βιου
