= Axiom of Maria =

Alchemical precept

Axiom of Maria is a precept in alchemy: "One becomes two, two becomes three, and out of the third comes the one as the fourth." It is attributed to 3rd century alchemist Maria Prophetissa, also called Mary the Jewess, sister of Moses, or the Copt. A more detailed quote was provided by the seventh-century alchemistic author called Christianos, who cited that what Maria uttered was "One becomes two, two becomes three, and by means of the third and fourth achieves unity; thus two are but one". Marie-Louise von Franz also gave an alternative version, which states: "Out of the One comes Two, out of Two comes Three, and from the Third comes the One as the Fourth." The axiom served as a recurring theme associated with alchemy for over seventeen centuries.

== Interpretations ==
An interpretation of the axiom treats it as an aphorism for the feminine principle, earth and the regions under it while also representing evil as interpolated between the uneven numbers of the Christian dogma.

Swiss psychiatrist Carl Jung (1875–1961) used the axiom as a metaphor for the process of individuation. One is unconscious wholeness; two is the conflict of opposites; three points to a potential resolution; the third is the transcendent function, described as a "psychic function that arises from the tension between consciousness and the unconscious and supports their union"; and the one as the fourth is a transformed state of consciousness, relatively whole and at peace.

Jung speaks of the axiom of Maria as running in various forms through the whole of alchemy like a leitmotiv. In "The Psychology of the Transference" he writes of the fourfold nature of the transforming process using the language of Greek alchemy:

"It begins with the four separate elements, the state of chaos, and ascends by degrees to the three manifestations of Mercurius in the inorganic, organic, and spiritual worlds; and, after attaining the form of Sol and Luna (i.e., the precious metals, gold and silver, but also the radiance of the gods who can overcome the strife of the elements by love), it culminates in the one and indivisible (incorruptible, ethereal, eternal) nature of the anima, the quinta essentia, aqua permanens, tincture, or lapis philosophorum. This progression from the number 4 to 3 to 2 to 1 is the 'axiom of Maria'..."

The Axiom of Maria may be interpreted as an alchemical analogy of the process of individuation from the many to the one, from undifferentiated unconsciousness to individual consciousness.

== Works cited ==
- Haeffner, Mark. The Dictionary of Alchemy: From Maria Prophetissa to Isaac Newton. The Aquarian Press, London, 1991. ISBN 1-85538-085-4
- Jung, C.G. Psychology and Alchemy. Collected Works, Vol. 12. Bollingen Series XX. 2nd Edition. Princeton University Press, 1980. ISBN 0-691-01831-6 (PBK.)
- Jung, C.G. The Practice of Psychotherapy. Collected Works, Vol. 16. Bollingen Series XX. 2nd Edition. Princeton University Press, 1985. ISBN 0-691-01870-7 (PBK.)
- Sharp, Daryl. Jung Lexicon: A Primer of Terms and Concepts. Inner City Books, Toronto, 1991. ISBN 0-919123-48-1
- von Franz, Marie-Louise. Number and Time: Reflections Leading Towards a Unification of Psychology and Physics. Rider & Company, London, 1974. ISBN 0-09-121020-8
