= Maria the Copt =

Maria or Mary the Copt may refer to:

- Mary the Jewess, early alchemist first appearing in Zosimos of Panopolis' (c. 300) writings
- Maria al-Qibtiyya (died 637), Egyptian woman who gave birth to a son by the prophet Muhammad
