= Alchemy =

Branch of natural philosophy

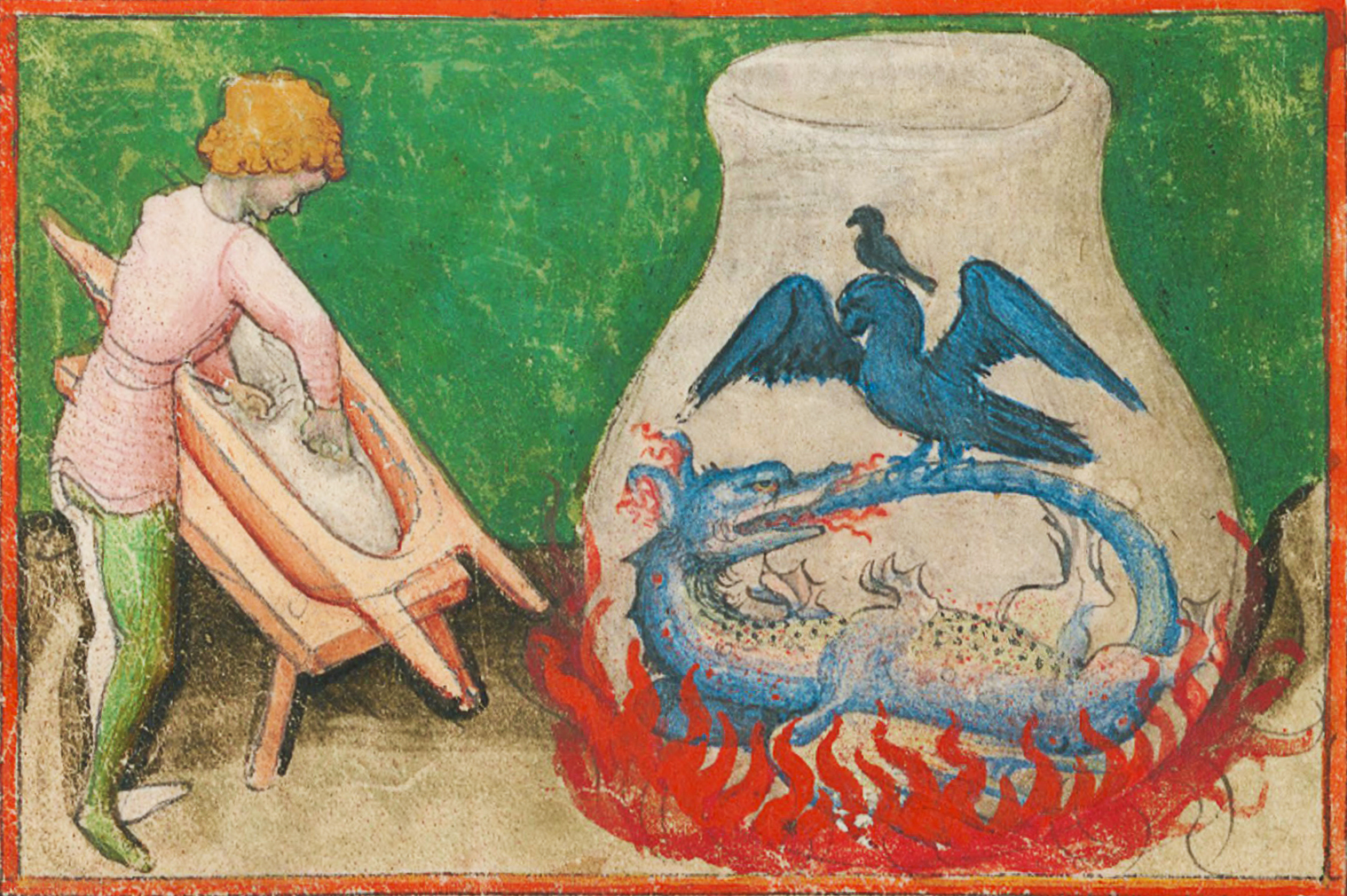
15th century depiction of an Ouroboros from the alchemical treatise Aurora consurgens (Zurich, Rheinau 172).

Alchemy (from the Arabic word al-kīmīā, الكیمیاء) is an ancient branch of natural philosophy, a philosophical and protoscientific tradition that was once practised in China, India, the Muslim world, and Europe. In its Western form, alchemy is first attested in pseudepigraphical texts written in Greco-Roman Egypt during the first few centuries AD. Greek-speaking alchemists often named their craft "the Art" (τέχνη) or "Knowledge" (ἐπιστήμη), and it was often characterised as mystic (μυστική), sacred (ἱɛρά), or divine (θɛíα).

Alchemists attempted to purify, mature, and perfect certain materials. (Note: For a detailed look into the problems of defining alchemy, see Linden 1996, pp. 6–36) Common aims were chrysopoeia, the transmutation of "base metals" (e.g., lead) into "noble metals" (particularly gold); the creation of an elixir of immortality; and the creation of panaceas able to cure any disease. The perfection of the human body and soul was thought to result from the alchemical magnum opus ("Great Work"). The concept of creating the philosopher's stone was variously connected with all of these projects.

Islamic and European alchemists developed a basic set of laboratory techniques, theories, and terms, some of which are still in use today. They did not abandon the Ancient Greek philosophical idea that everything is composed of four elements, and they tended to guard their work in secrecy, often making use of cyphers and cryptic symbolism. In Europe, the 12th-century translations of medieval Islamic works on science into Latin and the associated rediscovery of Aristotelian philosophy gave birth to a flourishing tradition of Latin alchemy. This late medieval tradition of alchemy would go on to play a significant role in the development of early modern science (particularly chemistry and medicine).

Modern discussions of alchemy are generally split into an examination of its exoteric practical applications and its esoteric spiritual aspects, despite criticisms by scholars such as Eric J. Holmyard and Marie-Louise von Franz that they should be understood as complementary. The former is pursued by historians of the physical sciences, who examine the subject in terms of early chemistry, medicine, and charlatanism, and the philosophical and religious contexts in which these events occurred. The latter interests historians of esotericism, psychologists, and some philosophers and spiritualists. The subject has made an ongoing impact on literature and the arts.

== Etymology ==
The word alchemy comes from Old French alkimie, used in Medieval Latin as alchymia. This name was itself adopted from the Arabic word al-kīmiyā (الكيمياء). The Arabic al-kīmiyā in turn was a borrowing of the Late Greek term khēmeía (χημεία), also spelled khumeia (χυμεία) and khēmía (χημία), with al- being the Arabic definite article 'the'. Together this association can be interpreted as 'the process of transmutation by which to fuse or reunite with the divine or original form'. Several etymologies have been proposed for the Greek term. The first was proposed by Zosimos of Panopolis (3rd–4th centuries), who derived it from the name of a book, the Khemeu. Hermann Diels argued in 1914 that it rather derived from χύμα, used to describe metallic objects formed by casting.

Others trace its roots to the Egyptian name kēme, (Note: kmt, or km m t O49) meaning 'black earth', which refers to the fertile and auriferous soil of the Nile valley, as opposed to red desert sand.

== History ==
Alchemy comprises a plurality of philosophical traditions extending across approximately four millennia and spanning three continents. The marked tendency of these traditions toward esoteric and highly symbolic modes of expression renders it difficult to reconstruct their patterns of mutual influence and genealogical relationships. Three major strands exist which appear to be mostly independent, at least in their earlier stages: Chinese alchemy, centered in China; Indian alchemy (Rasayana), centered on the Indian subcontinent; and Western alchemy, which occurred around the Mediterranean Basin and whose center shifted over the millennia from Greco-Roman Egypt to the Muslim world, and finally medieval Europe. Chinese alchemy was closely connected to Taoism and Indian alchemy with the Dharmic faiths. In contrast, Western alchemy developed its philosophical system mostly independent of but influenced by various Western religions. It is still an open question whether these three strands share a common origin, or to what extent they influenced each other.

=== Hellenistic Egypt ===
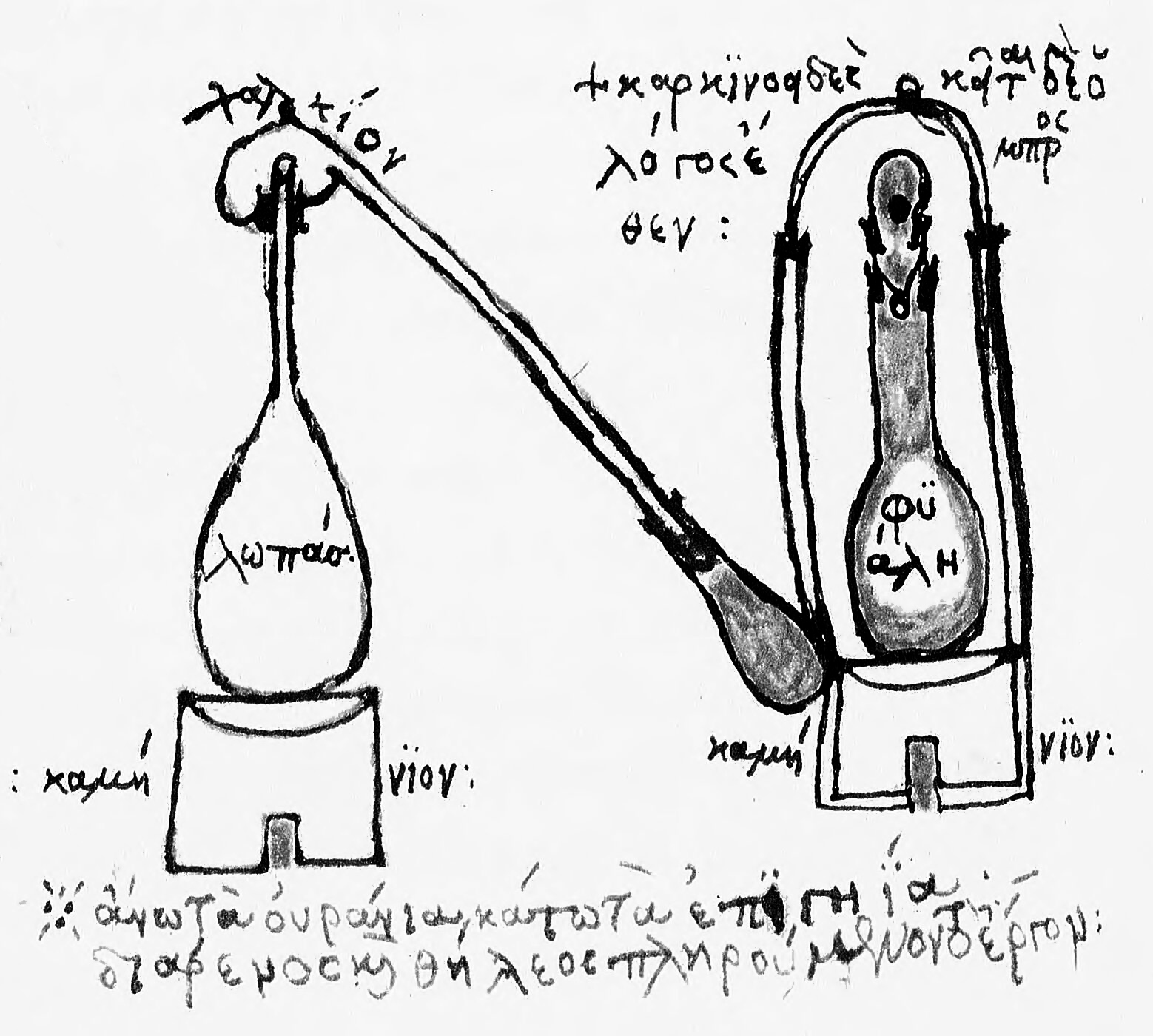
Ambix, cucurbit and retort of Zosimos (man. Paris, Grec 2327).

The start of Western alchemy may generally be traced to Hellenistic Egypt, where the city of Alexandria was a center of alchemical knowledge, and retained its pre-eminence through most of the Greek and Roman periods. Following the work of André-Jean Festugière, modern scholars see alchemical practice in the Roman Empire as originating from the Egyptian goldsmith's art, Greek philosophy and different religious traditions. Tracing the origins of the alchemical art in Egypt is complicated by the pseudepigraphic nature of texts from the Greek alchemical corpus. The treatises of Zosimos of Panopolis, the earliest historically attested author (fl. c. 300), can help in situating the other authors. Zosimus based his work on that of older alchemical authors, such as Mary the Jewess, Pseudo-Democritus, and Agathodaimon, but very little is known about any of these authors. The most complete of their works, the Four Books of Pseudo-Democritus, were probably written in the first century AD.

Recent scholarship tends to emphasize the testimony of Zosimus, who traced the alchemical arts back to Egyptian metallurgical and ceremonial practices. It has been argued that early alchemical writers borrowed the vocabulary of Greek philosophical schools but did not implement any of its doctrines in a systematic way. Zosimos of Panopolis wrote in the Final Abstinence (a.k.a. the Final Count) that the ancient practice of "tinctures" (the technical Greek term for the alchemical arts) had been taken over by certain "demons" who taught the art only to those who offered them sacrifices. Since Zosimos called the demons "the guardians of places" (οἱ κατὰ τόπον ἔφοροι, hoi katà tópon éphoroi) and those who offered them sacrifices "priests" (ἱερέα, hieréa), it appears that he was speaking about the gods of Egypt and their priests. While critical of the kind of alchemy he associated with the Egyptian priests and their followers, Zosimos nonetheless saw the tradition's recent past as rooted in the rites of the Egyptian temples.

==== Mythology ====
Zosimos of Panopolis asserted that alchemy dated back to Pharaonic Egypt where it was the domain of the priestly class, though there is little to no evidence for his assertion. Alchemical writers used classical figures from Greek (e.g., Hades), Roman (e.g., Lucius), and Egyptian mythology to illuminate their works and allegorize alchemical transmutation. These included the pantheon of gods related to the classical planets, Isis, Osiris, Jason, and many others.

The central figure in the mythology of alchemy is Hermes Trismegistus (Ἑρμῆς ὁ Τρισμέγιστος, 'Hermes the Thrice-Greatest'). His name is derived from the god Thoth and his Greek counterpart, Hermes. Hermes and his caduceus or serpent-staff, were among alchemy's principal symbols. According to Clement of Alexandria, he wrote what were called the "forty-two books of Hermes", covering all fields of knowledge.

==== Hermetica and Emerald Tablet ====
The Hermetica are a compendium of texts attributed to Hermes Trismegistus. Many of them have close historical connections with Western alchemical philosophy and practice (which was sometimes called the Hermetic philosophy by its practitioners). By modern convention, the Hermetica is usually subdivided into two main categories: the "technical" and "religio-philosophical" Hermetica. The "technical" Hermetica deals with alchemy, astrology, medicine, pharmacology, and magic. Its oldest parts were written in Greek and may go back as far as the second or third century BC.

Many of the texts in the "technical" Hermetica were later translated, first into Arabic and then into Latin, often being extensively revised and expanded throughout the centuries. Some of them were originally written in Arabic. In other cases their status as an original work or translation remains unclear. These Arabic and Latin Hermetic texts were widely copied throughout the Middle Ages. The most famous of these texts is the Emerald Tablet, also known as the Smaragdine Table or the Tabula Smaragdina, a compact and cryptic text. The earliest known versions of it are four Arabic recensions preserved in mystical and alchemical treatises between the 8th and 10th centuries AD—chiefly the Secret of Creation (سر الخليقة, Sirr al-Khalīqa) and the Secret of Secrets (سرّ الأسرار, Sirr al-Asrār). From the 12th century onward, Latin translations—most notably, the widespread so-called Vulgate (not to be confused with the late-fourth-century Latin translation of the Tanakh and Christian New Testament known as the Vulgate)—introduced the Emerald Tablet to Europe, where it attracted great scholarly interest. Medieval commentators such as Ortolanus interpreted it as a "foundational text" of alchemical instructions for producing the philosopher's stone and making gold.

==== Technology ====
The dawn of Western alchemy is sometimes associated with that of metallurgy, extending back to 3500 BC. Many writings were lost when the Roman emperor Diocletian ordered the burning of alchemical books after suppressing a revolt in Alexandria (AD 292). Few original Egyptian documents on alchemy have survived, most notable among them the Stockholm papyrus and the Leyden papyrus X. Dating from AD 250 to 300, they contained recipes for dyeing and making artificial gemstones, cleaning and fabricating pearls, and manufacturing of imitation gold and silver. These writings lack the mystical, philosophical elements of alchemy, but do contain the works of Bolus of Mendes (or Pseudo-Democritus), which aligned these recipes with theoretical knowledge of astrology and the classical elements. Between the time of Bolus and Zosimos, the change took place that transformed this metallurgy into a Hermetic art.

==== Philosophy ====
Alexandria acted as a melting pot for philosophies of Pythagoreanism, Platonism, Stoicism, and Gnosticism that formed the origin of alchemy's character. An important example of alchemy's roots in Greek philosophy, originated by Empedocles and developed by Aristotle, was that all things in the universe were formed from only four elements: earth, air, water, and fire. According to Aristotle, each element had a sphere to which it belonged and to which it would return if left undisturbed. The four elements of the Greek were mostly qualitative aspects of matter rather than the modern quantitative elements' natures, according to Titus Burckhardt:

True alchemy never regarded earth, air, water, and fire as corporeal or chemical substances in the present-day sense of the word. The four elements are simply the primary, and most general, qualities by means of which the amorphous and purely quantitative substance of all bodies first reveals itself in differentiated form."

Later alchemists extensively developed the mystical aspects of this concept.

Alchemy coexisted alongside emerging Christianity. Lactantius believed Hermes Trismegistus had prophesied its birth. Augustine of Hippo later affirmed this in the 4th and 5th centuries, but also condemned Trismegistus for idolatry. Examples of pagan, Christian, and Jewish alchemists can be found during this period.

Most of the Greco-Roman alchemists preceding Zosimos are known only by pseudonyms, such as Moses of Alexandria, Isis, Cleopatra the Alchemist, Pseudo-Democritus, and Ostanes. Other authors such as Komarios and Chymes are known only through surviving fragments of text. After AD 400, Greek alchemical writers occupied themselves solely in commenting on the works of these predecessors. By the middle of the 7th century, alchemy was almost an entirely mystical discipline. It was at that time that Khalid Ibn Yazid sparked its migration from Alexandria to the Islamic world, facilitating the translation and preservation of Greek alchemical texts in the 8th and 9th centuries.

=== Byzantium ===
Greek alchemy was preserved in medieval Byzantine manuscripts after the fall of Roman Egypt, yet historians have only relatively recently begun to study the development of Greek alchemy in the Byzantine period.

=== India ===
The 2nd millennium BC Vedas describe a connection between eternal life and gold. A considerable knowledge of metallurgy has been exhibited in a third-century AD Arthashastra, which provides ingredients of explosives (agniyoga) and salts extracted from fertile soils and plant remains (yavakshara) such as saltpetre/nitre, perfume (different qualities of perfumes are mentioned), and granulated (refined) sugar. Buddhist texts from the 2nd to 5th centuries mention the transmutation of base metals to gold. According to some scholars Greek alchemy may have influenced Indian alchemy but there are no hard evidences to back this claim.

The 11th-century Persian chemist and physician Abū Rayhān Bīrūnī, who visited Gujarat as part of the court of Mahmud of Ghazni, reported locals

have a science similar to alchemy which is quite peculiar to them, which in Sanskrit is called Rasāyana and in Persian Rasavātam. It means the art of obtaining/manipulating Rasa: nectar, mercury, and juice. This art was restricted to certain operations, metals, drugs, compounds, and medicines, many of which have mercury as their core element. Its principles restored the health of those who were ill beyond hope and gave back youth to fading old age.

The goals of alchemy in India included the creation of a divine body (divya-deham) and immortality while still embodied (jīvan-mukti). Sanskrit alchemical texts include much material on the manipulation of mercury and sulphur, that are homologized with the semen of the god Śiva and the menstrual blood of the goddess Devī.

Some early alchemical writings seem to have their origins in the Kaula tantric schools associated to the teachings of the personality of Matsyendranath. Other early writings are found in the Jaina medical treatise Kalyāṇakārakam of Ugrāditya, written in South India in the early 9th century.

Two famous early Indian alchemical authors were Nāgārjuna Siddha and Nityanātha Siddha. Nāgārjuna Siddha was a Buddhist monk. His book Rasendramangalam is an example of Indian alchemy and medicine. Nityanātha Siddha wrote Rasaratnākara, which was also a highly influential work. In Sanskrit, rasa translates to "mercury", and Nāgārjuna Siddha was said to have developed a method of converting mercury into gold. An example of academic scholarship on Indian alchemy is The Alchemical Body by Indologist David Gordon White. A modern bibliography on Indian alchemical studies has been written by White.

The contents of 39 Sanskrit alchemical treatises have been analysed in detail in Gerrit Jan Meulenbeld's History of Indian Medical Literature (HIML). (Note: To wit, the Ānandakanda, Āyurvedaprakāśa, Gorakṣasaṃhitā, Kākacaṇḍeśvarīmatatantra, Kākacaṇḍīśvarakalpatantra, Kūpīpakvarasanirmāṇavijñāna, Pāradasaṃhitā, Rasabhaiṣajyakalpanāvijñāna, Rasādhyāya, Rasahṛdayatantra, Rasajalanidhi, Rasakāmadhenu, Rasakaumudī, Rasamañjarī, Rasamitra, Rasāmṛta, Rasapaddhati, Rasapradīpa, Rasaprakāśasudhākara, Rasarājalakṣmī, Rasaratnadīpikā, Rasaratnākara, Rasaratnasamuccaya, Rasārṇava, Rasārṇavakalpa, Rasasaṃketakalikā, Rasasāra, Rasataraṅgiṇī, Rasāyanasāra, Rasayogasāgara, Rasayogaśataka, Rasendracintāmaṇi, Rasendracūḍāmaṇi, Rasendramaṅgala, Rasendrapurāṇa, Rasendrasambhava, Rasendrasārasaṅgraha, Rasoddhāratantra or Rasasaṃhitā, and Rasopaniṣad.) The discussion of these works in the HIML gives a summary of the contents of each work, their special features, and where possible the evidence concerning their dating. Chapter 13 of the HIML, Various works on rasaśāstra and ratnaśāstra ('Various works on alchemy and gems') gives brief details of another 655 treatises. In some cases, Meulenbeld gives notes on the contents and authorship of these works; in other cases references are made only to the unpublished manuscripts of these titles. A great deal remains to be discovered about Indian alchemical literature.

=== Islamic world ===
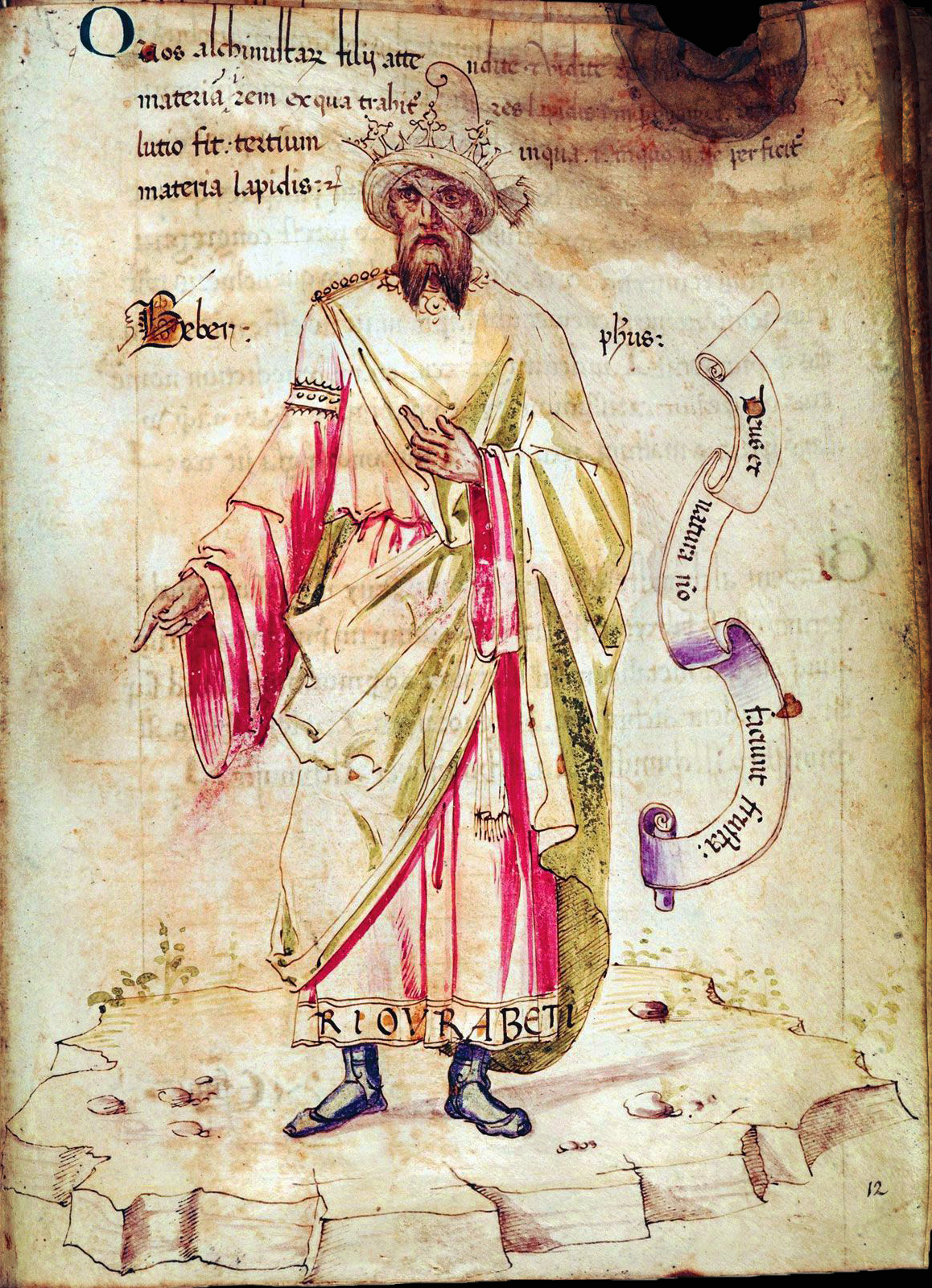
15th-century artistic impression of Jabir ibn Hayyan (Geber), Codici Ashburnhamiani 1166, Biblioteca Medicea Laurenziana, Florence

After the fall of the Roman Empire, the focus of alchemical development moved to the Islamic World. Much more is known about Islamic alchemy because it was better documented: indeed, most of the earlier writings that have come down through the years were preserved as Arabic translations. The word alchemy itself was derived from the Arabic word al-kīmiyā (الكيمياء). The early Islamic world was a melting pot for alchemy. Platonic and Aristotelian thought, which had already been somewhat appropriated into Hermetic science, continued to be assimilated during the late 7th and early 8th centuries through Syriac translations and scholarship.

In the late ninth and early tenth centuries, the Arabic works attributed to Jābir ibn Hayyān (Latinized as "Geber" or "Geberus") introduced a new approach to alchemy. Paul Kraus, who wrote the standard reference work on ibn Hayyan, put it as follows:

To form an idea of the historical place of Jabir's alchemy and to tackle the problem of its sources, it is advisable to compare it with what remains to us of the alchemical literature in the Greek language. One knows in which miserable state this literature reached us. Collected by Byzantine scientists from the tenth century, the corpus of the Greek alchemists is a cluster of incoherent fragments, going back to all the times since the third century until the end of the Middle Ages.

The efforts of Berthelot and Ruelle to put a little order in this mass of literature led only to poor results, and the later researchers, among them in particular Mrs. Hammer-Jensen, Tannery, Lagercrantz, von Lippmann, Reitzenstein, Ruska, Bidez, Festugière and others, could make clear only few points of detail ....

The study of the Greek alchemists is not very encouraging. An even surface examination of the Greek texts shows that a very small part only was organized according to true experiments of laboratory: even the supposedly technical writings, in the state where we find them today, are unintelligible nonsense which refuses any interpretation.

It is different with Jabir's alchemy. The relatively clear description of the processes and the alchemical apparati, the methodical classification of the substances, mark an experimental spirit which is extremely far away from the weird and odd esotericism of the Greek texts. The theory on which Jabir supports his operations is one of clearness and of an impressive unity. More than with the other Arab authors, one notes with him a balance between theoretical teaching and practical teaching, between the 'ilm and the amal. In vain one would seek in the Greek texts a work as systematic as that which is presented, for example, in the Book of Seventy.

Islamic philosophers also made great contributions to alchemical Hermeticism. The most influential author in this regard was arguably ibn Hayyan. ibn Hayyan's ultimate goal was takwin, the artificial creation of life in the alchemical laboratory—up to and including human life. He analysed each Aristotelian element in terms of four basic qualities of hotness, coldness, dryness, and moistness. According to ibn Hayyan, in each metal two of these qualities were interior and two were exterior. For example, lead was externally cold and dry, while gold was hot and moist. Thus, ibn Hayyan theorized, by rearranging the qualities of one metal, a different metal would result. By this reasoning, the search for the philosopher's stone was introduced to Western alchemy. Ibn Hayyan developed an elaborate numerology whereby the root letters of a substance's name in Arabic, when treated with various transformations, held correspondences to the element's physical properties. The atomic theory of corpuscularianism, where all physical bodies possess an inner and outer layer of minute particles or corpuscles, also has its origins in the work of ibn Hayyan.

From the 9th to 14th centuries, alchemical theories faced criticism from a variety of practical Muslim chemists, including Al-Kindi, Abū al-Rayhān al-Bīrūnī, Avicenna and Ibn Khaldun. In particular, they wrote refutations against the idea of the transmutation of metals. From the 14th century onwards, many materials and practices originally belonging to Indian alchemy (Rasayana) were assimilated in the Persian texts written by Muslim scholars.

=== East Asia ===
Researchers have found evidence that Chinese alchemists and philosophers discovered complex mathematical phenomena that were shared with Arab alchemists during the medieval period. Discovered first in China before the Common Era, the "magic square of three" was propagated to followers of Jabir ibn Hayyan at some point over the proceeding several hundred years. Other commonalities shared between the two alchemical schools of thought include discrete naming for ingredients and heavy influence from the natural elements. The Silk Road provided a clear path for the exchange of goods, ideas, ingredients, religion, and many other aspects of life with which alchemy is intertwined.

Taoist alchemists often use this alternate version of the taijitu.

Whereas European alchemy eventually centered on the transmutation of base metals into noble metals, Chinese alchemy had a more obvious connection to medicine. The philosopher's stone of European alchemists can be compared to the elixir of life sought by Chinese alchemists. In the Hermetic view, these two goals were not unconnected, and the philosopher's stone was often equated with the universal panacea; therefore, the two traditions may have had more in common than initially appears.

As early as 317 AD, Ge Hong documented the use of metals, minerals, and elixirs in early Chinese medicine. Hong identified three ancient Chinese documents—titled the Scripture of Great Clarity, the Scripture of the Nine Elixirs, and the Scripture of the Golden Liquor—as texts containing fundamental alchemical information. He also described alchemy, along with meditation, as the sole spiritual practices that could allow one to gain immortality or to transcend to a higher state of being. In his work Inner Chapters of the Book of the Master Who Embraces Spontaneous Nature (317 AD), Hong argued that alchemical solutions such as elixirs were preferable to traditional medicinal treatment due to the spiritual protection they could provide. In the centuries following Ge Hong's death, the emphasis placed on alchemy as a spiritual practice among Chinese Taoists was reduced. In 499 AD, Tao Hongjing refuted Hong's statement that alchemy is as important a spiritual practice as Shangqing meditation. While Hongjing did not deny the power of alchemical elixirs to grant immortality or provide divine protection, he ultimately found the Scripture of the Nine Elixirs to be ambiguous and spiritually unfulfilling, aiming to implement more accessible practising techniques.

In the early 700s, Neidan (a.k.a. internal alchemy) was adopted by Daoists as a new form of alchemy. Neidan emphasized appeasing the inner gods that inhabit the human body by practising alchemy with compounds naturally found in the body, rather than the mixing of natural resources that was so emphasized in early Dao alchemy. For example, saliva was often considered nourishment for the inner gods and did not require any conscious alchemical reaction to produce. The inner gods were not thought of as physical presences occupying each person, but rather a collection of deities that are each said to represent and protect a specific body part or region. Although those who practised Neidan prioritized meditation over external alchemical strategies, many of the same elixirs and constituents from previous Daoist alchemical schools of thought continued to be utilized in tandem with meditation. Eternal life remained a consideration for Neidan alchemists, as it was believed that one would become immortal if an inner god were to be immortalized within them through spiritual fulfilment.

Chinese alchemy was closely connected to Taoist techniques in traditional Chinese medicine like acupuncture and moxibustion. In the early Song dynasty, followers of this Taoist idea—chiefly the elite and upper class—would ingest mercuric sulfide, which, though tolerable in low levels, led many to suicide. Thinking that this consequential death would lead to freedom and access to Tian, the ensuing deaths encouraged practitioners to eschew this method of alchemy in favour of external sources (e.g., the aforementioned Tai Chi Chuan and mastering of one's qi,.) Chinese alchemy was introduced to the West by Obed Simon Johnson.

=== Medieval Europe ===
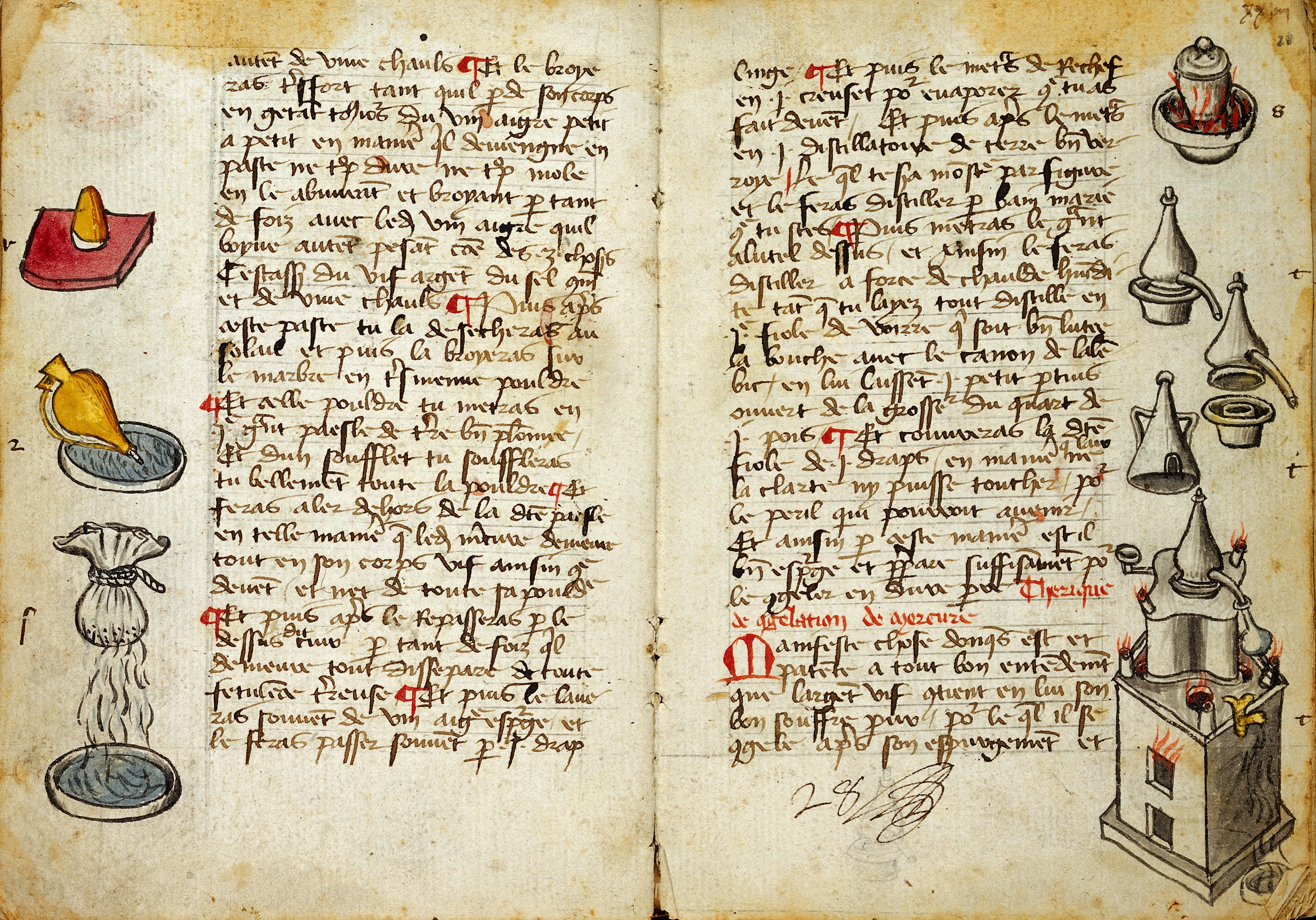
"An illuminated page from a book on alchemical processes and receipts", ca. 15th century. Welcome Collection ref: MS.446

The introduction of alchemy to Latin Europe may be dated to 11 February 1144, with the completion of Robert of Chester's translation of the Liber de compositione alchemiae (Book on the Composition of Alchemy) from an Arabic work attributed to Khalid ibn Yazid. Although European craftsmen and technicians pre-existed, Robert notes in his preface that alchemy (here still referring to the elixir rather than to the art itself) was unknown in Latin Europe at the time of his writing. The translation of Arabic texts concerning numerous disciplines including alchemy flourished in 12th-century Toledo, Spain, through contributors like Gerard of Cremona and Adelard of Bath. Translations of the time included the Turba Philosophorum, and the works of Avicenna and Muhammad ibn Zakariya al-Razi. These brought with them many new words to the European vocabulary for which there was no previous Latin equivalent. Alcohol, carboy, elixir, and athanor are examples.

Meanwhile, theologian contemporaries of the translators made strides towards the reconciliation of faith and experimental rationalism, thereby priming Europe for the influx of alchemical thought. The 11th-century theologian Anselm of Canterbury put forth the opinion that faith and rationalism were compatible and encouraged rationalism in a Christian context. In the early 12th century, Peter Abelard followed Anselm's work, laying down the foundation for acceptance of Aristotelian thought before the first works of Aristotle had reached the West. In the early 13th century, Robert Grosseteste used Abelard's methods of analysis and added the use of observation, experimentation, and conclusions when conducting scientific investigations. Grosseteste also did much work to reconcile Platonic and Aristotelian thinking.

Through much of the 12th and 13th centuries, alchemical knowledge in Europe remained centered on translations, and new Latin contributions were not made. The efforts of the translators were succeeded by that of the encyclopaedists. In the 13th century, Albertus Magnus and Roger Bacon were the most notable of these, their work summarizing and explaining the newly imported alchemical knowledge in Aristotelian terms. Albertus Magnus, a Dominican friar, is known to have written works such as the Book of Minerals where he observed and commented on the operations and theories of alchemical authorities like Hermes Trismegistus, pseudo-Democritus, and unnamed alchemists of his time. Albertus critically compared these to the writings of Aristotle and Avicenna, where they concerned the transmutation of metals. From the time shortly after his death through to the 15th century, more than 28 alchemical tracts were misattributed to him, a common practice giving rise to his reputation as an accomplished alchemist.

Roger Bacon, a Franciscan Order friar who wrote on a wide variety of topics, including optics, comparative linguistics, and medicine, composed his Great Work (Opus Majus) for Pope Clement IV as part of a project towards rebuilding the medieval university curriculum to include the new learning of his time. While alchemy was not more important to him than other sciences and he did not produce allegorical works on the topic, he did consider it and astrology to be important parts of both natural philosophy and theology and his contributions advanced alchemy's connections to soteriology and Christian theology. Bacon's writings integrated morality, salvation, alchemy, and the prolongation of life. His correspondence with Clement highlighted this, noting the importance of alchemy to the papacy. Like the Greeks before him, Bacon acknowledged the division of alchemy into practical and theoretical spheres. He noted that the theoretical lay outside the scope of Aristotle, the natural philosophers, and all Latin writers of his time. The practical confirmed the theoretical, and Bacon advocated its uses in natural science and medicine. In later European legend, he became an archmage. In particular, along with Albertus Magnus, he was credited with the forging of a brazen head capable of answering its owner's questions.

Soon after Bacon, the influential work of Pseudo-Geber (sometimes identified as Paul of Taranto) appeared. His Summa Perfectionis remained a staple summary of alchemical practice and theory through the medieval and renaissance periods. It was notable for its inclusion of practical chemical operations alongside sulphur-mercury theory, and the unusual clarity with which they were described. By the end of the 13th century, alchemy had developed into a fairly structured system of belief. Adepts believed in the macrocosm-microcosm theories of Hermes; namely, that processes that affect minerals and other substances could have an effect on the human body (for example, if one could learn the secret of purifying gold, one could use the technique to purify the human soul). They believed in the four elements and the four qualities as described above, and they had a strong tradition of cloaking their written ideas in a labyrinth of coded jargon set with traps to mislead the uninitiated. Finally, the alchemists practised their art: they actively experimented with chemicals and made observations and theories about how the universe operated. Their entire philosophy revolved around their belief that the human soul was divided within itself after the fall of Adam. By purifying the two parts of humankind's soul, humans could be reunited with God.

Gold and Silver Act 1403
- Act of Parliament
- Parliament of England
- Long title: It shall be felony to use the craft of multiplication of gold or silver.
- Citation: 5 Hen. 4. c. 4

Dates
- Royal assent: 20 March 1404
- Commencement: 14 January 1404
Other legislation
Repealed by	Royal Mines Act 1688

Status: Repealed

In the 14th century, alchemy became more accessible to Europeans outside the confines of Latin-speaking churchmen and scholars. Alchemical discourse shifted from scholarly philosophical debate to an exposed social commentary on the alchemists themselves. Dante Alighieri, Piers Plowman, and Geoffrey Chaucer all painted unflattering pictures of alchemists as thieves and liars. Pope John XXII's 1317 edict Spondent quas non-exhibent forbade the false promises of transmutation made by pseudo-alchemists. Roman Catholic Inquisitor General Nicholas Eymerich's Directorium Inquisitorum, written in 1376, associated alchemy with the performance of demonic rituals, which Eymerich differentiated from magic performed in accordance with Christian scripture. This did not, however, lead to any change in the Inquisition's monitoring or prosecution of alchemists. In 1404, Henry IV of England banned the practice of multiplying metals by the passing of the Gold and Silver Act 1403 (5 Hen. 4. c. 4) (although it was possible to buy a licence to attempt to make gold alchemically, and a number were granted by Henry VI and Edward IV). These critiques and regulations centered more around pseudo-alchemical charlatanism than the actual study of alchemy, which continued with an increasingly Christian tone. The 14th century saw the Christian imagery of death and resurrection employed in the alchemical texts of Petrus Bonus, John of Rupescissa, and in works written in the name of Raymond Lull and Arnold of Villanova.

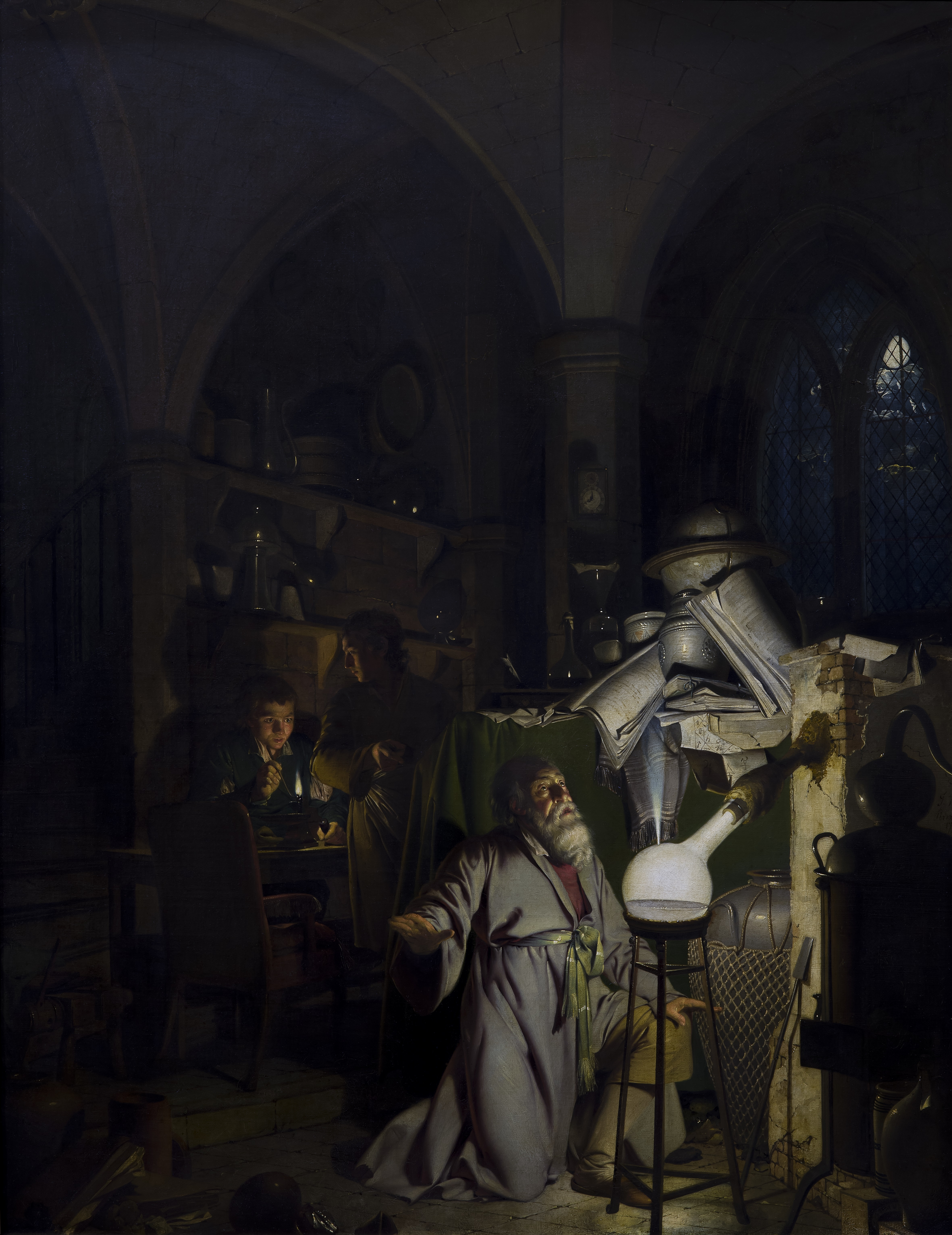
The Alchemist in Search of the Philosopher's Stone, by Joseph Wright, 1771

Nicolas Flamel became well-known as an alchemist to the point where he had many pseudepigraphic imitators. Although the historical Flamel existed, the writings and legends assigned to him only appeared in 1612.

A common idea in European alchemy in the medieval era was a metaphysical "Homeric chain of wise men that link[ed] heaven and earth" that included ancient pagan philosophers and other important historical figures.

=== Renaissance and early modern Europe ===
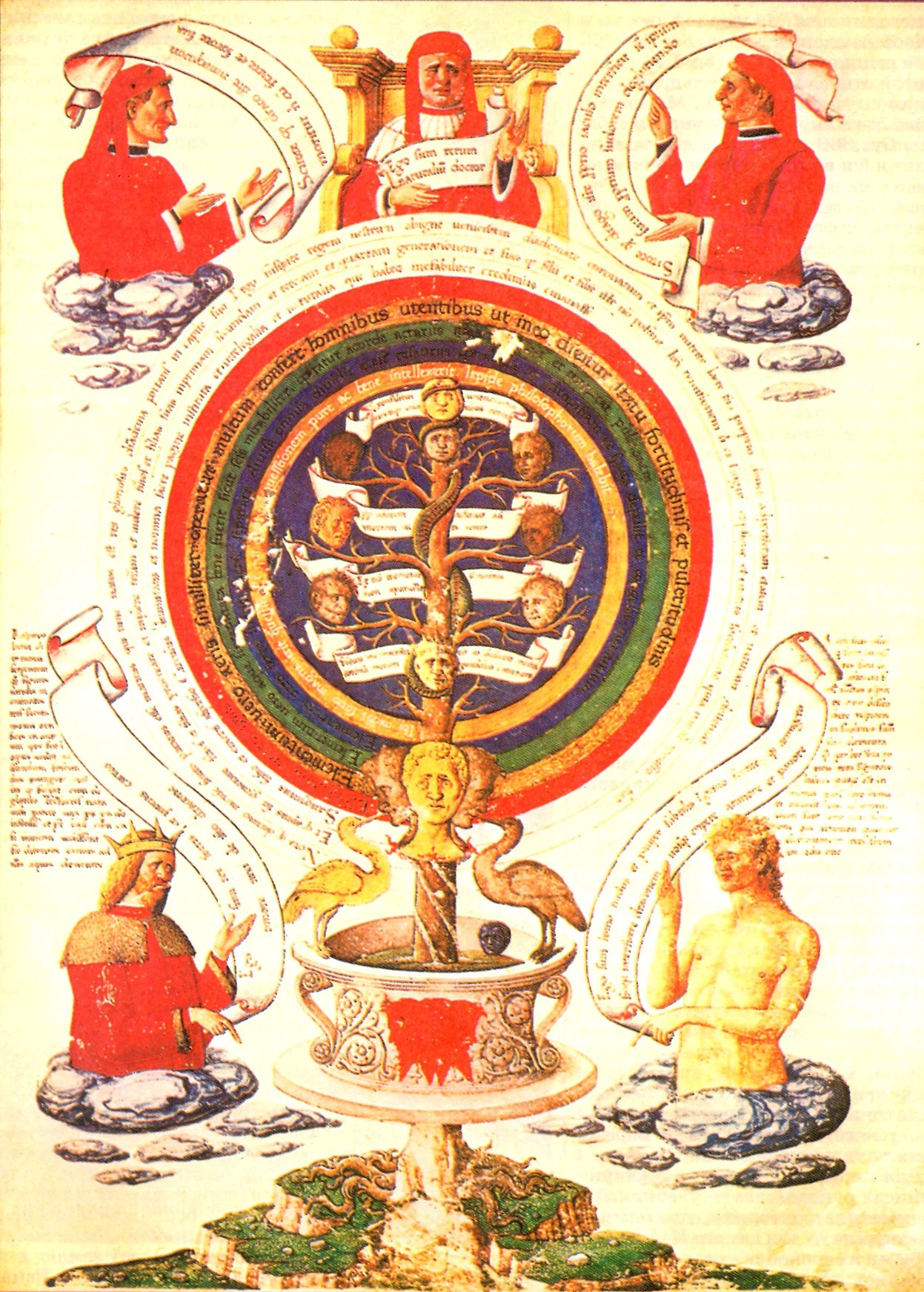
Page from alchemic treatise of Ramon Llull, 16th century

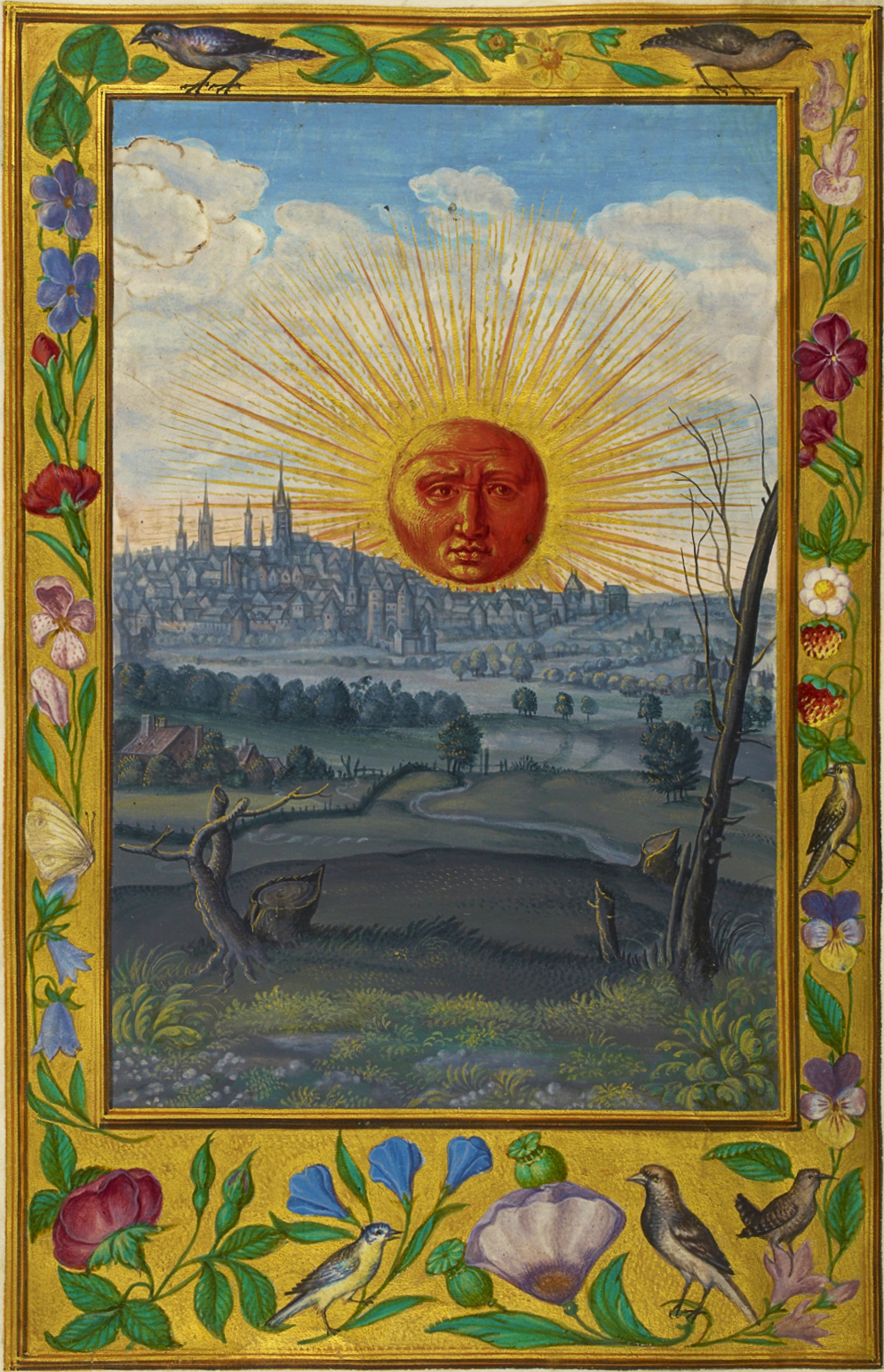
The red sun rising over the city, the final illustration of 16th-century alchemical text, Splendor Solis. The word rubedo, meaning "redness", was adopted by alchemists and signalled alchemical success, and the end of the great work.

During the Renaissance, Hermetic and Platonic foundations were restored to European alchemy. The dawn of medical, pharmaceutical, occult, and entrepreneurial branches of alchemy followed. In the late 15th century, Marsilio Ficino translated the Corpus Hermeticum and the works of Plato into Latin. These were previously unavailable to Europeans who for the first time had a full picture of the alchemical theory that Bacon had declared absent. Renaissance Humanism and Renaissance Neoplatonism guided alchemists away from physics to refocus on mankind as the alchemical vessel.

Esoteric systems developed that blended alchemy into a broader occult Hermeticism, fusing it with magic, astrology, and Christian Kabbalah. A key figure in this development was Heinrich Cornelius Agrippa (1486–1535), a German who received his Hermetic education in Italy in the schools of the humanists. In his De Occulta Philosophia, he attempted to merge Judaism's Kabbalah, Hermeticism, and alchemy. He was instrumental in spreading this new blend of Hermeticism outside the borders of Italy.

Paracelsus, born Philippus Aureolus Theophrastus Bombastus von Hohenheim (1493–1541), cast alchemy into a new form, rejecting some of Agrippa's occultism and moving away from chrysopoeia. Paracelsus pioneered the use of chemicals and minerals in medicine and wrote, "Many have said of Alchemy, that it is for the making of gold and silver. For me such is not the aim, but to consider only what virtue and power may lie in medicines."

His Hermetical views were that sickness and health in the body relied on the harmony of humankind as the microcosm and Nature the macrocosm. He took an approach different from those before him, using this analogy not in the manner of soul-purification but in the manner that humans must have certain balances of minerals in their bodies, and that certain illnesses of the body had chemical remedies that could cure them.

John Dee (13 July 1527 – December 1608) followed Agrippa's occult tradition. Although better known for angel summoning, divination, and his role as astrologer, cryptographer, and consultant to Elizabeth I of England, Dee's alchemical Monas Hieroglyphica, written in 1564 was his most popular and influential work. His writing portrayed alchemy as a sort of terrestrial astronomy in line with the Hermetic axiom as above, so below. During the 17th century, a short-lived "supernatural" interpretation of alchemy became popular, including support by fellows of the Royal Society: Robert Boyle and Elias Ashmole. Proponents of the supernatural interpretation of alchemy believed that the philosopher's stone might be used to summon and communicate with angels.

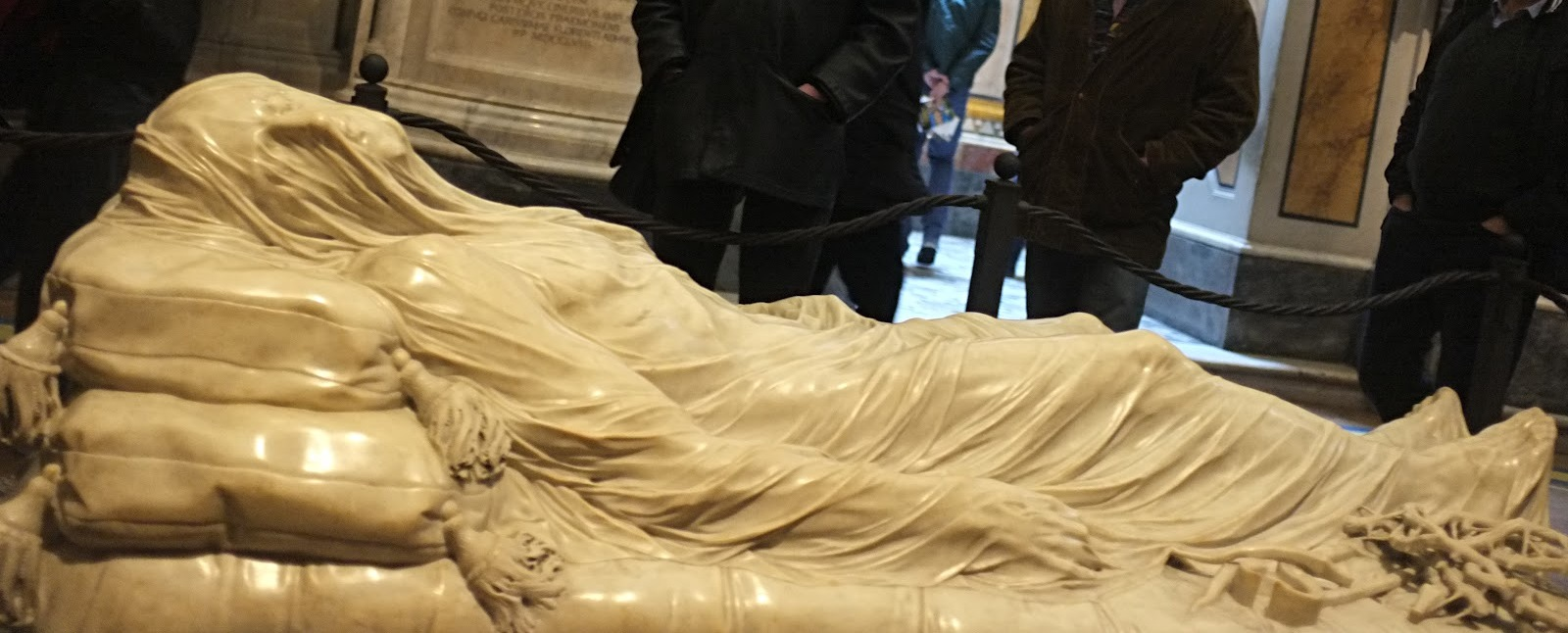
Veiled Christ, a 1753 statue by Giuseppe Sanmartino, was widely believed to be created by alchemy.

Entrepreneurial opportunities were common for the alchemists of Renaissance Europe. Alchemists were contracted by the elite for practical purposes related to mining, medical services, and the production of chemicals, medicines, metals, and gemstones. Rudolf II, Holy Roman Emperor, in the late 16th century, famously received and sponsored various alchemists at his court in Prague, including Dee and his associate Edward Kelley. King James IV of Scotland, Julius, Duke of Brunswick-Lüneburg, Henry V, Duke of Brunswick-Lüneburg, Augustus, Elector of Saxony, Julius Echter von Mespelbrunn, and Maurice, Landgrave of Hesse-Kassel all contracted alchemists. John's son Arthur Dee worked as a court physician to Michael I of Russia and Charles I of England but also compiled the alchemical book Fasciculus Chemicus.

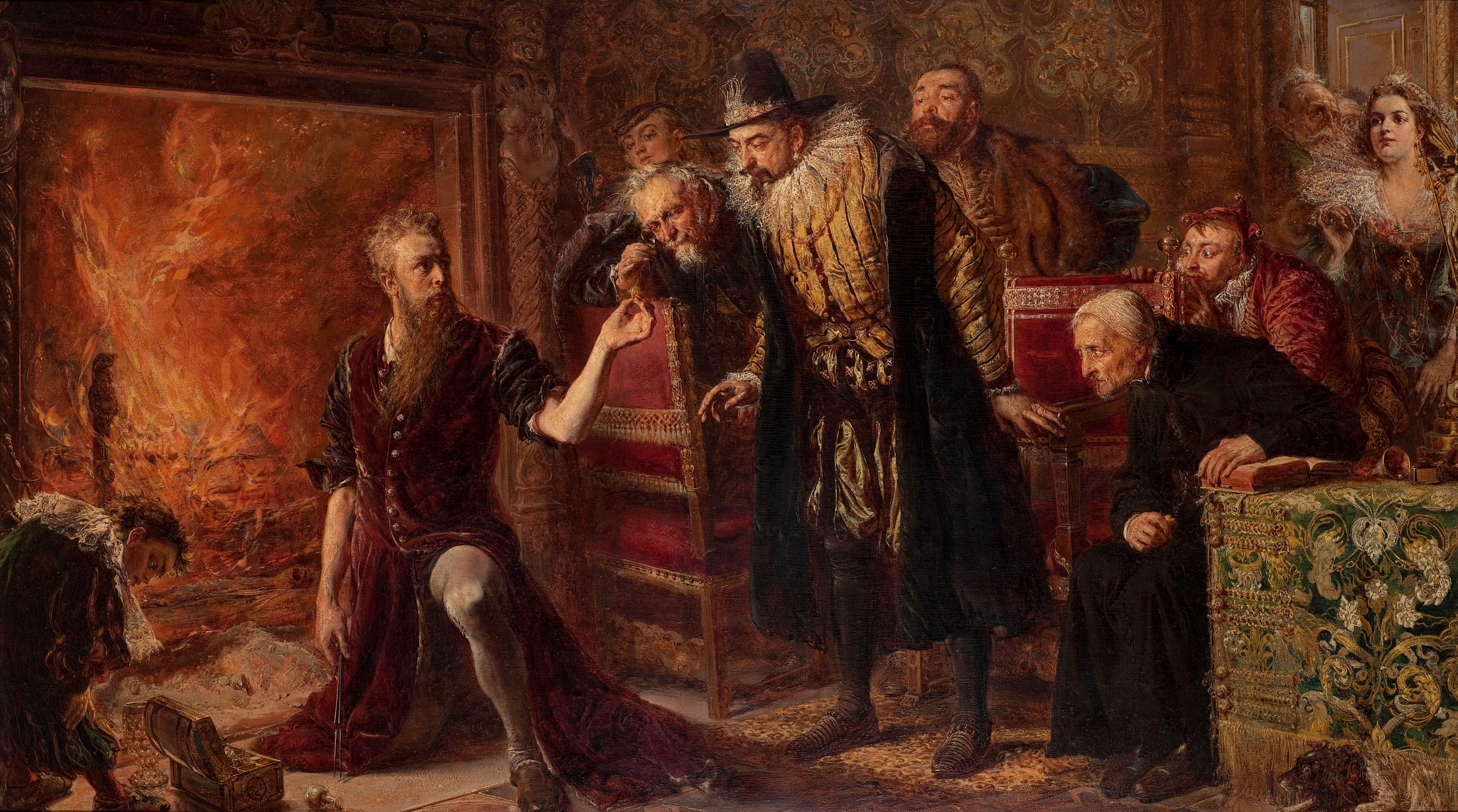
Alchemist Sendivogius (1566–1636) by Jan Matejko, 1867

Although most of these appointments were legitimate, the trend of pseudo-alchemical fraud continued through the Renaissance. Betrüger would use sleight of hand, or claims of secret knowledge to make money or secure patronage. Legitimate mystical and medical alchemists such as Michael Maier and Heinrich Khunrath wrote about fraudulent transmutations, distinguishing themselves from the con artists.

The terms "chemia" and "alchemia" were used as synonyms in the early modern period, and the differences between alchemy, chemistry and small-scale assaying and metallurgy were not as neat as in the present day. There were important overlaps between practitioners, and trying to classify them into alchemists, chemists and craftsmen is anachronistic. For example, Tycho Brahe (1546–1601), an alchemist better known for his astronomical and astrological investigations, had a laboratory built at his Uraniborg observatory/research institute. Michael Sendivogius (Michał Sędziwój, 1566–1636), a Polish alchemist, philosopher, medical doctor and pioneer of chemistry wrote mystical works but is also credited with distilling oxygen in a lab sometime around 1600. Sendivogious taught his technique to Cornelius Drebbel who, in 1621, applied this in a submarine. Isaac Newton devoted considerably more of his writing to the study of alchemy (see Isaac Newton's occult studies) than he did to either optics or physics. Other early modern alchemists who were eminent in their other studies include Robert Boyle, and Jan Baptist van Helmont. Their Hermeticism complemented rather than precluded their practical achievements in medicine and science.

=== Later modern period ===
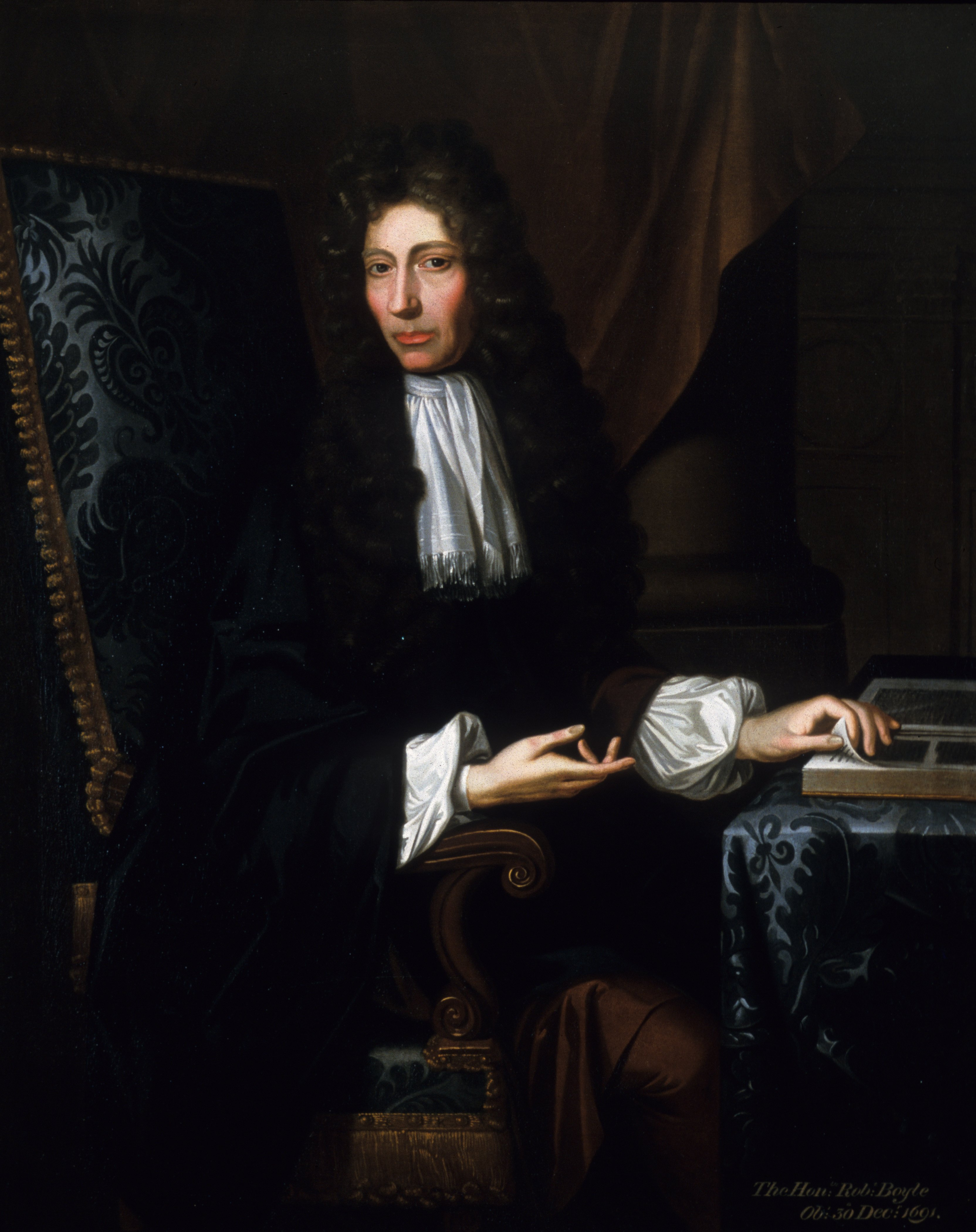
Robert Boyle

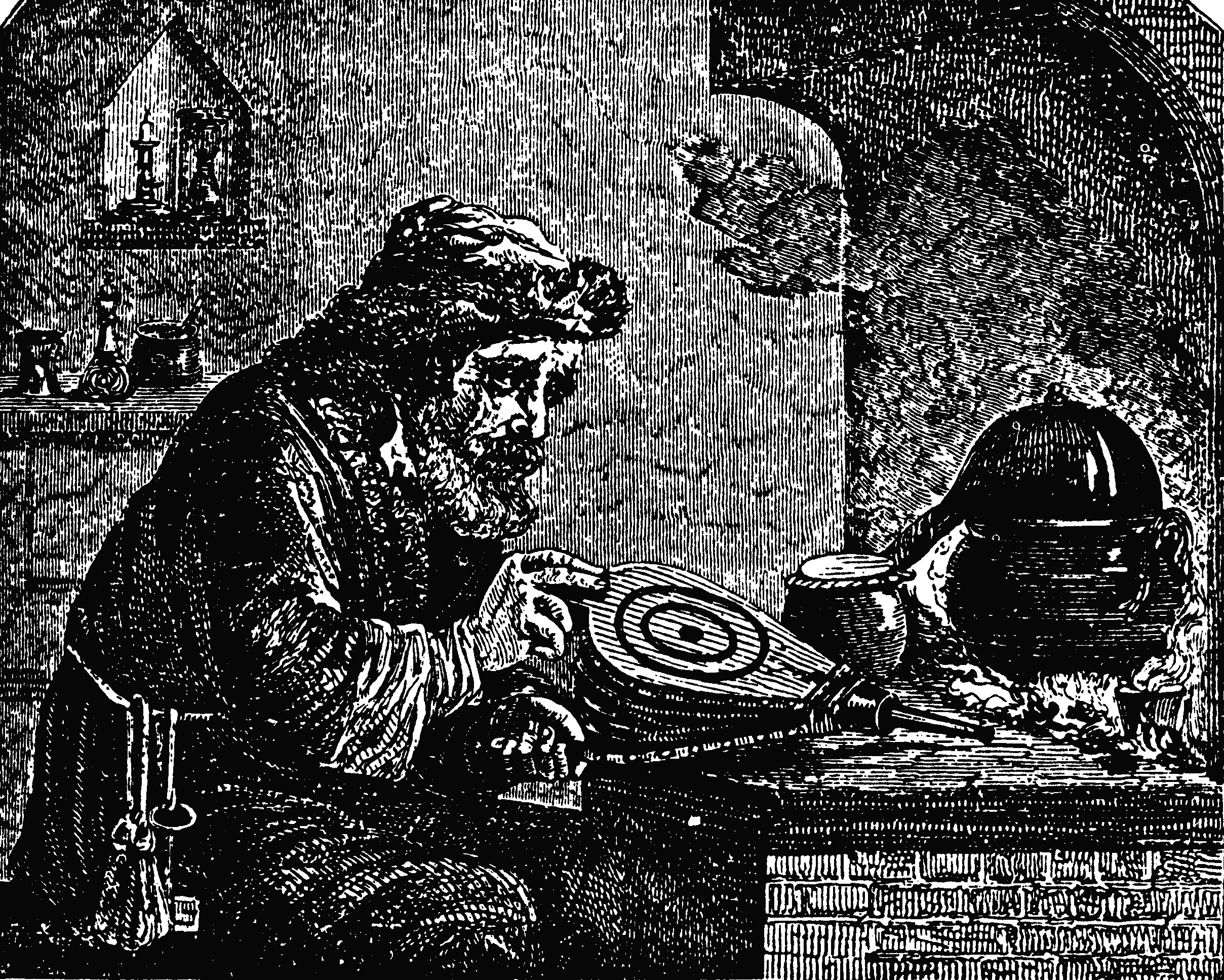
An alchemist, pictured in Charles Mackay's Extraordinary Popular Delusions and the Madness of Crowds

The decline of European alchemy was brought about by the rise of modern science with its emphasis on rigorous quantitative experimentation and its disdain for "ancient wisdom". Although the seeds of these events were planted as early as the 17th century, alchemy still flourished for some two hundred years, and in fact may have reached its peak in the 18th century. As late as 1781 James Price claimed to have produced a powder that could transmute mercury into silver or gold. Early modern European alchemy continued to exhibit a diversity of theories, practices, and purposes: "Scholastic and anti-Aristotelian, Paracelsian and anti-Paracelsian, Hermetic, Neoplatonic, mechanistic, vitalistic, and more—plus virtually every combination and compromise thereof."

Robert Boyle (1627–1691) pioneered the scientific method in chemical investigations. He assumed nothing in his experiments and compiled every piece of relevant data. Boyle would note the place in which the experiment was carried out, the wind characteristics, the position of the Sun and Moon, and the barometer reading, all just in case they proved to be relevant. This approach eventually led to the founding of modern chemistry in the 18th and 19th centuries, based on revolutionary discoveries and ideas of Lavoisier and John Dalton.

Beginning around 1720, a rigid distinction began to be drawn for the first time between "alchemy" and "chemistry". By the 1740s, "alchemy" was now restricted to the realm of gold making, leading to the popular belief that alchemists were charlatans, and the tradition itself nothing more than a fraud. In order to protect the developing science of modern chemistry from the negative censure to which alchemy was being subjected, academic writers during the 18th-century scientific Enlightenment attempted to divorce and separate the "new" chemistry from the "old" practices of alchemy. This move was mostly successful, and the consequences of this continued into the 19th, 20th and 21st centuries.

During the occult revival of the early 19th century, alchemy received new attention as an occult science. The esoteric or occultist school that arose during the 19th century held the view that the substances and operations mentioned in alchemical literature are to be interpreted in a spiritual sense, less than as a practical tradition or protoscience. This interpretation claimed that the obscure language of the alchemical texts, which 19th century practitioners were not always able to decipher, were an allegorical guise for spiritual, moral or mystical processes.

Two seminal figures during this period were Mary Anne Atwood and Ethan Allen Hitchcock, who independently published similar works regarding spiritual alchemy. Both rebuffed the growing successes of chemistry, developing a completely esoteric view of alchemy. Atwood wrote: "No modern art or chemistry, notwithstanding all its surreptitious claims, has any thing in common with Alchemy." Atwood's work influenced subsequent authors of the occult revival including Eliphas Levi, Arthur Edward Waite, and Rudolf Steiner. Hitchcock, in his Remarks Upon Alchymists (1855) attempted to make a case for his spiritual interpretation with his claim that the alchemists wrote about a spiritual discipline under a materialistic guise in order to avoid accusations of blasphemy from the church and state. In 1845, Baron Carl Reichenbach, published his studies on Odic force, a concept with some similarities to alchemy, but his research did not enter the mainstream of scientific discussion.

In 1946, Louis Cattiaux published the Message Retrouvé, a work that was at once philosophical, mystical and highly influenced by alchemy. In his lineage, many researchers, including Emmanuel and Charles d'Hooghvorst, are updating alchemical studies in France and Belgium.

=== Women ===
Several women appear in the earliest history of alchemy. Michael Maier names four women who were able to make the philosophers' stone: Mary the Jewess, Cleopatra the Alchemist, Medera, and Taphnutia. Zosimos's sister Theosebia (later known as Euthica the Arab) and Isis the Prophetess also played roles in early alchemical texts.

The first alchemist whose name we know was Mary the Jewess (c. 200 A.D.). Early sources claim that Mary (or Maria) devised a number of improvements to alchemical equipment and tools as well as novel techniques in chemistry. Her best known advances were in heating and distillation processes. The laboratory water-bath, known eponymously (especially in France) as the bain-marie, is said to have been invented or at least improved by her. Essentially a double-boiler, it was (and is) used in chemistry for processes that required gentle heating. The tribikos (a modified distillation apparatus) and the kerotakis (a more intricate apparatus used especially for sublimations) are two other advancements in the process of distillation that are credited to her. Although we have no writing from Mary herself, she is known from the early-fourth-century writings of Zosimos of Panopolis. After the Greco-Roman period, women's names appear less frequently in alchemical literature.

Towards the end of the Middle Ages and beginning of the Renaissance, due to the emergence of print, women were able to access the alchemical knowledge from texts of the preceding centuries. Caterina Sforza, the Countess of Forlì and Lady of Imola, is one of the few confirmed female alchemists after Mary the Jewess. As she owned an apothecary, she would practice science and conduct experiments in her botanic gardens and laboratories. Being knowledgeable in alchemy and pharmacology, she recorded all of her alchemical ventures in a manuscript named Experimenti ('Experiments'). The manuscript contained more than four hundred recipes covering alchemy as well as cosmetics and medicine. One of these recipes was for the water of talc. Talc, which makes up talcum powder, is a mineral which, when combined with water and distilled, was said to produce a solution which yielded many benefits. These supposed benefits included turning silver to gold and rejuvenation. When combined with white wine, its powder form could be ingested to counteract poison. Furthermore, if that powder was mixed and drunk with white wine, it was said to be a source of protection from any poison, sickness, or plague. Other recipes were for making hair dyes, lotions, lip colours. There was also information on how to treat a variety of ailments from fevers and coughs to epilepsy and cancer. In addition, there were instructions on producing the quintessence (or aether), an elixir which was believed to be able to heal all sicknesses, defend against diseases, and perpetuate youthfulness. She also wrote about creating the illustrious philosophers' stone.

Some women known for their interest in alchemy were Catherine de' Medici, the Queen of France, and Marie de' Medici, the following Queen of France, who carried out experiments in her personal laboratory. Also, Isabella d'Este, the Marchioness of Mantua, made perfumes herself to serve as gifts. Due to the proliferation in alchemical literature of pseudepigrapha and anonymous works, however, it is difficult to know which of the alchemists were actually women. This contributed to a broader pattern in which male authors credited prominent noblewomen for beauty products with the purpose of appealing to a female audience. For example, in Ricettario galante ("Gallant Recipe-Book"), the distillation of lemons and roses was attributed to Elisabetta Gonzaga, the duchess of Urbino. In the same book, Isabella d'Aragona, the daughter of Alfonso II of Naples, is accredited for recipes involving alum and mercury. Ippolita Maria Sforza is even referred to in an anonymous manuscript about a hand lotion created with rose powder and crushed bones.

As the sixteenth century went on, scientific culture flourished and people began collecting "secrets". During this period "secrets" referred to experiments, and the most coveted ones were not those which were bizarre, but the ones which had been proven to yield the desired outcome. In this period, the only book of secrets ascribed to a woman was I secreti della signora Isabella Cortese ('The Secrets of Signora Isabella Cortese'). This book contained information on how to turn base metals into gold, medicine, and cosmetics. However, it is rumoured that a man, Girolamo Ruscelli, was the real author and only used a female voice to attract female readers.

In the nineteenth-century, Mary Anne Atwood's A Suggestive Inquiry into the Hermetic Mystery (1850) marked the return of women during the occult revival.

=== Modern historical research ===
The history of alchemy has become a recognized subject of academic study. As the language of the alchemists is analysed, historians are becoming more aware of the connections between that discipline and other facets of Western cultural history, such as the evolution of science and philosophy, the sociology and psychology of the intellectual communities, kabbalism, spiritualism, Rosicrucianism, and other mystic movements. Institutions involved in this research include The Chymistry of Isaac Newton project at Indiana University, the University of Exeter Centre for the Study of Esotericism (EXESESO), the European Society for the Study of Western Esotericism (ESSWE), and the University of Amsterdam's Sub-department for the History of Hermetic Philosophy and Related Currents. A large collection of books on alchemy is kept in the Bibliotheca Philosophica Hermetica in Amsterdam.

Journals which publish regularly on the topic of Alchemy include Ambix, published by the Society for the History of Alchemy and Chemistry, and Isis, published by the History of Science Society.

== Core concepts ==
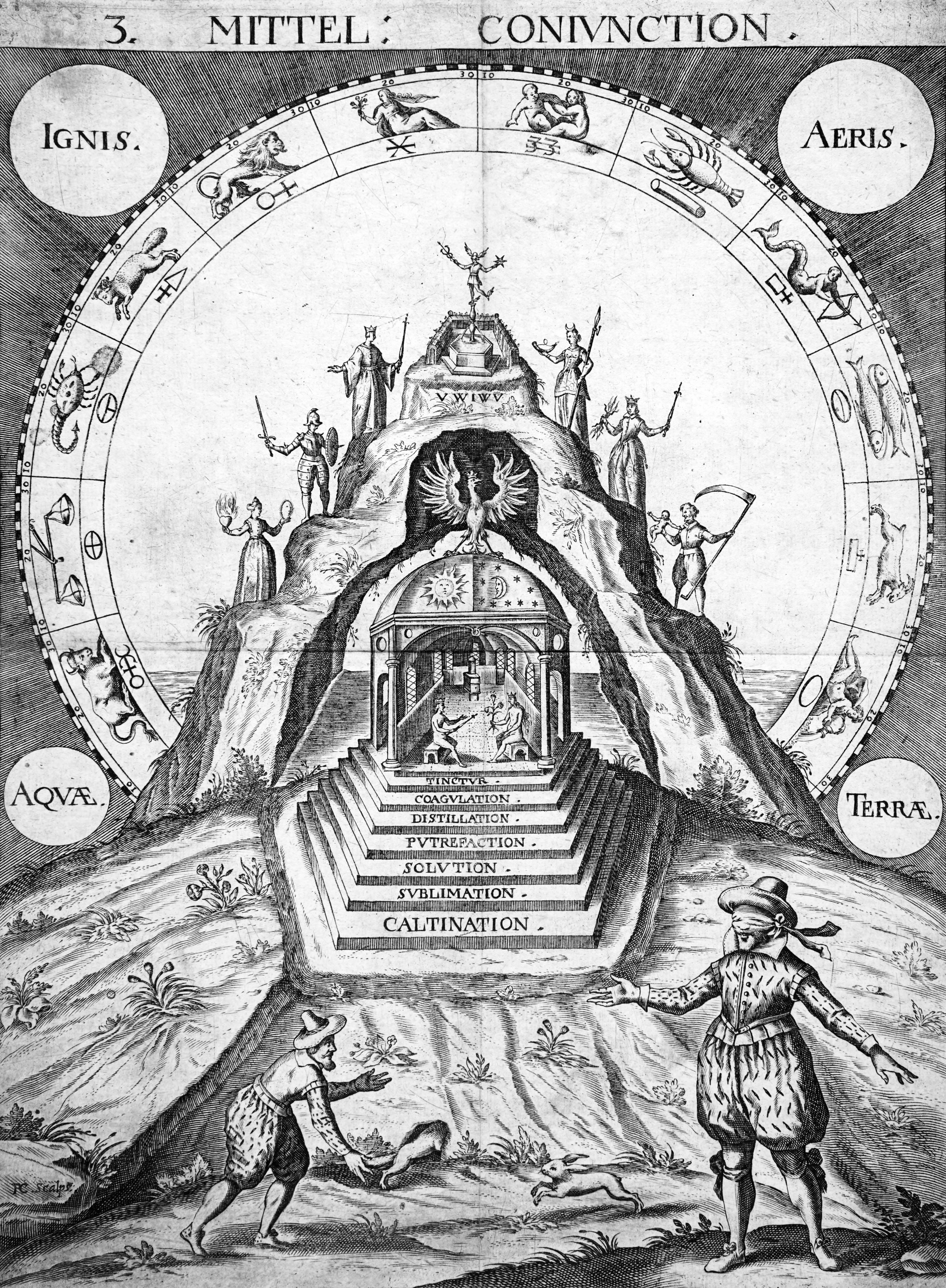
Mandala illustrating common alchemical concepts, symbols, and processes. From Spiegel der Kunst und Natur.

Western alchemical theory corresponds to the worldview of late antiquity in which it was born. Concepts were imported from Neoplatonism and earlier Greek cosmology. As such, the classical elements appear in alchemical writings, as do the seven classical planets and the corresponding seven metals of antiquity. Similarly, the gods of the Roman pantheon who are associated with these luminaries are discussed in alchemical literature. The concepts of prima materia and anima mundi are central to the theory of the philosopher's stone.

=== Magnum opus ===
The Great Work of Alchemy is often described as a series of four stages represented by colours.

- nigredo, a blackening or melanosis
- albedo, a whitening or leucosis
- citrinitas, a yellowing or xanthosis
- rubedo, a reddening, purpling, or iosis

== Modern era ==
Due to the complexity and obscurity of alchemical literature, and the 18th-century diffusion of remaining alchemical practitioners into the area of chemistry, the general understanding of alchemy in the 19th and 20th centuries was influenced by several distinct and radically different interpretations. Those focusing on the exoteric, such as historians of science Lawrence M. Principe and William R. Newman, have interpreted the Decknamen ('code words') of alchemy as physical substances. These scholars have reconstructed physicochemical experiments that they say are described in medieval and early modern texts. At the opposite end of the spectrum, focusing on the esoteric, scholars, such as Florin George Călian and Anna Marie Roos, who question the reading of Principe and Newman, interpret these same Decknamen as spiritual, religious, or psychological concepts.

New interpretations of alchemy are still perpetuated, sometimes merging with concepts from New Age or radical environmentalism movements. Groups like the Rosicrucians and Freemasons have a continued interest in alchemy and its symbolism. Since the Victorian revival of alchemy, "occultists reinterpreted alchemy as a spiritual practice, involving the self-transformation of the practitioner and only incidentally or not at all the transformation of laboratory substances", which has contributed to a merger of magic and alchemy in popular thought.

=== Esoteric interpretations of historical texts ===
In the eyes of a variety of modern esoteric and neo-Hermetic practitioners, alchemy is primarily spiritual. In this interpretation, transmutation of lead into gold is presented as an analogy for personal transmutation, purification, and perfection.

According to this view, early alchemists, such as Zosimos of Panopolis (c. 300 AD), highlighted the spiritual nature of the alchemical quest, symbolic of a religious regeneration of the human soul. This approach is held to have continued in the Middle Ages, as metaphysical aspects, substances, physical states, and material processes are supposed to have been used as metaphors for spiritual entities, spiritual states, and, ultimately, transformation. In this sense, the literal meanings of alchemical formulas hid a spiritual philosophy. In the neo-Hermeticist interpretation, both the transmutation of common metals into gold and the universal panacea are held to symbolize evolution from an imperfect, diseased, corruptible, and ephemeral state toward a perfect, healthy, incorruptible, and everlasting state, so the philosopher's stone then represented a mystic key that would make this evolution possible. Applied to the alchemist, the twin goal symbolized their evolution from ignorance to enlightenment, and the stone represented a hidden spiritual truth or power that would lead to that goal. In texts that are believed to have been written according to this view, the cryptic alchemical symbols, diagrams, and textual imagery of late alchemical works are supposed to contain multiple layers of meanings, allegories, and references to other equally cryptic works, which must be laboriously decoded to discover their true meaning.

In his 1766 Alchemical Catechism, Théodore Henri de Tschudi suggested that the usage of the metals was symbolic:

Q. When the Philosophers speak of gold and silver, from which they extract their matter, are we to suppose that they refer to the vulgar gold and silver?
A. By no means; vulgar silver and gold are dead, while those of the Philosophers are full of life.

=== Psychology ===
Alchemical symbolism was important in analytical psychology. It was revived and popularized from near extinction by the Swiss psychologist Carl Gustav Jung. Jung was initially confounded and at odds with alchemy and its images but after being given a copy of The Secret of the Golden Flower, a Chinese alchemical text translated by his friend Richard Wilhelm, he discovered a direct correlation or parallel between the symbolic images in the alchemical drawings and the inner, symbolic images coming up in his patients' dreams, visions, or fantasies. He observed these alchemical images occurring during the psychic process of transformation, a process that Jung called "individuation". Specifically, he regarded the conjuring up of images of gold or Lapis as symbolic expressions of the origin and goal of this "process of individuation". Together with his alchemical mystica soror (mystical sister), Jungian Swiss analyst Marie-Louise von Franz, Jung began collecting old alchemical texts, compiled a lexicon of key phrases with cross-references, and pored over them. The volumes of work he wrote shed new light on understanding the art of transubstantiation and renewed alchemy's popularity as a symbolic process of coming into wholeness as a human being, where opposites are brought into contact and inner and outer, spirit and matter are reunited in the hieros gamos, or divine marriage. His writings are influential in general psychology, especially for those interested in understanding the importance of dreams, symbols, and the unconscious archetypal forces (Jungian archetypes) that comprise all psychic life.

Both von Franz and Jung contributed significantly to the subject and work of alchemy and to its continued presence in psychology and contemporary culture. Among the volumes Jung wrote on alchemy, his magnum opus is volume 14 of his Collected Works, Mysterium Coniunctionis.

=== Literature ===
Alchemy has had a long-standing relationship with art, evident in both alchemical texts and mainstream entertainment. Literary alchemy appears throughout the history of English literature from William Shakespeare to J. K. Rowling, and also the popular Japanese manga Fullmetal Alchemist. Here, characters or plot structure follow an alchemical magnum opus. In the 14th century, Chaucer began a trend of alchemical satire that can still be seen in recent fantasy works, such as those of the late Sir Terry Pratchett. Another literary work inspired by the alchemical tradition is the 1988 novel The Alchemist by Brazilian writer Paulo Coelho.

Visual artists have had a similar relationship with alchemy. While some used it as a source of satire, others worked with the alchemists themselves or integrated alchemical thought or symbols in their work. Music was also present in the works of alchemists and continues to influence popular performers. In the last hundred years, alchemists have been portrayed in a magical and spagyric role in fantasy fiction, film, television, novels, comics, and video games.

=== Science ===
One goal of alchemy, the transmutation of base substances into gold, is now known to be impossible by means of traditional chemistry, but possible by other physical means. Although not financially worthwhile, gold was synthesized in particle accelerators as early as 1941.

== See also ==
- Alchemical symbol
- Chemistry
- Corentin Louis Kervran § Biological transmutation
- Cupellation
- Historicism
- History of chemistry
- List of alchemical substances
- List of alchemists
- List of obsolete occupations
- Nuclear transmutation
- Outline of alchemy
- Porta Alchemica
- Renaissance magic
- Spagyric
- Superseded theories in science
- Synthesis of precious metals
- Thaumaturgy
- Western esotericism

== Bibliography ==
=== Introductions and textbooks ===
- Beretta, Marco, ed. (2022). A Cultural History Of Chemistry in Antiquity. London: Bloomsbury. doi:10.5040/9781474203746. ISBN 978-1-4742-9453-9. (focus on technical aspects)
- Burnett, Charles; Moureau, Sébastien, eds. (2022). A Cultural History Of Chemistry in the Middle Ages. London: Bloomsbury. ISBN 978-1-4742-9454-6. (focus on technical aspects)
- Halleux, Robert (1979). Les textes alchimiques. Turnhout: Brepols. ISBN 978-2-503-36032-4.
- Joly, Bernard (2013). Histoire de l'alchimie. Paris: Vuibert-Adapt. ISBN 978-2-311-01248-4. (general overview)
- Martelli, Matteo (2019). L'alchimista antico: Dall'Egitto greco-romano a Bisanzio. Milano: Editrice Bibliografica. ISBN 978-88-7075-979-2. (Greek and Byzantine alchemy)
- Moran, Bruce, ed. (2022). A Cultural History Of Chemistry in the Early Modern Age. London: Bloomsbury. ISBN 978-1-4742-9459-1. (focus on technical aspects)
- Multhauf, Robert P. (1966). The Origins of Chemistry. London: Oldbourne. OCLC 977570829.
- Nicolaïdis, Efthymios, ed. (2018). Greek Alchemy from Late Antiquity to Early Modernity. De Diversis Artibus. Vol. 104. Turnhout: Brepols. doi:10.1484/M.DDA-EB.5.116173. ISBN 978-2-503-58191-0. (Greek and Byzantine alchemy)
- Partington, James R. (1970) [1961]. A History of Chemistry. Volume 1, Part I. London: Macmillan. ISBN 978-0-333-03490-3. (the second part of volume 1 was never published; the other volumes deal with the modern period and are not relevant for alchemy)
- Pereira, Michela (2001). Arcana Sapienza: Storia dell'alchimia occidentale dalle origini a Jung. Rome: Carocci. ISBN 978-88-430-9647-3. (general overview, focus on esoteric aspects)
- Principe, Lawrence M. (2013). The Secrets of Alchemy. University of Chicago Press. ISBN 978-0-226-68295-2. (general overview, written in a highly accessible style)
- Rampling, Jennifer M. (2020). The Experimental Fire: Inventing English Alchemy, 1300–1700. Chicago: University of Chicago Press. ISBN 978-0-226-82654-7.
- Viano, Cristina, ed. (2005). L'alchimie et ses racines philosophiques. La tradition grecque et la tradition arabe. Paris: Vrin. ISBN 978-2-7116-1754-8.

=== Greco-Egyptian alchemy ===
==== Texts ====
- Marcellin Berthelot and Charles-Émile Ruelle (eds.), Collection des anciens alchimistes grecs (CAAG), 3 vols., 1887–1888, Vol 1: https://gallica.bnf.fr/ark:/12148/bpt6k96492923, Vol 2: https://gallica.bnf.fr/ark:/12148/bpt6k9680734p, Vol. 3: https://gallica.bnf.fr/ark:/12148/bpt6k9634942s.
- André-Jean Festugière, La Révélation d'Hermès Trismégiste, Paris, Les Belles Lettres, 2014 (ISBN 978-2-251-32674-0, OCLC 897235256).
- Robert Halleux and Henri-Dominique Saffrey (eds.), Les alchimistes grecs, t. 1 : Papyrus de Leyde – Papyrus de Stockholm – Recettes, Paris, Les Belles Lettres, 1981.
- Otto Lagercrantz (ed), Papyrus Graecus Holmiensis, Uppsala, A.B. Akademiska Bokhandeln, 1913, Papyrus graecus holmiensis (P. holm.); Recepte für Silber, Steine und Purpur, bearb. von Otto Lagercrantz. Hrsg. mit Unterstützung des Vilh. Ekman'schen Universitätsfonds.
- Michèle Mertens and Henri-Dominique Saffrey (ed.), Les alchimistes grecs, t. 4.1 : Zosime de Panopolis. Mémoires authentiques, Paris, Les Belles Lettres, 1995.
- Andrée Collinet and Henri-Dominique Saffrey (ed.), Les alchimistes grecs, t. 10 : L'Anonyme de Zuretti ou l'Art sacré and divin de la chrysopée par un anonyme, Paris, Les Belles Lettres, 2000.
- Andrée Collinet (ed), Les alchimistes grecs, t. 11 : Recettes alchimiques (Par. Gr. 2419; Holkhamicus 109) – Cosmas le Hiéromoine – Chrysopée, Paris, Les Belles Lettres, 2000.
- Matteo Martelli (ed), The Four Books of Pseudo-Democritus, Maney Publishing, 2014.

==== Studies ====
- Dylan M. Burns, " μίξεώς τινι τέχνῃ κρείττονι : Alchemical Metaphor in the Paraphrase of Shem (NHC VII,1) ", Aries 15 (2015), p. 79–106.
- Alberto Camplani, " Procedimenti magico-alchemici e discorso filosofico ermetico " in Giuliana Lanata (ed.), Il Tardoantico alle soglie del Duemila, ETS, 2000, p. 73–98.
- Alberto Camplani and Marco Zambon, " Il sacrificio come problema in alcune correnti filosofice di età imperiale ", Annali di storia dell'esegesi 19 (2002), p. 59–99.
- Régine Charron and Louis Painchaud, " 'God is a Dyer,' The Background and Significance of a Puzzling Motif in the Coptic Gospel According to Philip (CG II, 3), Le Muséon 114 (2001), p. 41-50.
- Régine Charron, " The Apocryphon of John (NHC II,1) and the Greco-Egyptian Alchemical Literature ", Vigiliae Christinae 59 (2005), p. 438-456.
- Philippe Derchain, "L'Atelier des Orfèvres à Dendara et les origines de l'alchimie," Chronique d'Égypte, vol. 65, n^{o} 130, 1990, p. 219–242.
- Korshi Dosoo, " A History of the Theban Magical Library ", Bulletin of the American Society of Papyrologists 53 (2016), p. 251–274.
- Olivier Dufault, Early Greek Alchemy, Patronage and Innovation in Late Antiquity, California Classical Studies, 2019, Early Greek Alchemy, Patronage and Innovation in Late Antiquity.
- Sergio Knipe, " Sacrifice and self-transformation in the alchemical writings of Zosimus of Panopolis ", in Christopher Kelly, Richard Flower, Michael Stuart Williams (eds.), Unclassical Traditions. Volume II: Perspectives from East and West in Late Antiquity, Cambridge University Press, 2011, p. 59–69.
- André-Jean Festugière, La Révélation d'Hermès Trismégiste, Paris, Les Belles Lettres, 2014 ISBN 978-2-251-32674-0, OCLC 897235256.
- Kyle A. Fraser, " Zosimos of Panopolis and the Book of Enoch: Alchemy as Forbidden Knowledge ", Aries 4.2 (2004), p. 125–147.
- Kyle A. Fraser, " Baptized in Gnosis: The Spiritual Alchemy of Zosimos of Panopolis ", Dionysius 25 (2007), p. 33–54.
- Kyle A. Fraser, " Distilling Nature's Secrets: The Sacred Art of Alchemy ", in John Scarborough and Paul Keyser (eds.), Oxford Handbook of Science and Medicine in the Classical World, Oxford University Press, 2018, p. 721–742. 2018. .
- Shannon Grimes, Becoming Gold: Zosimos of Panopolis and the Alchemical Arts in Roman Egypt, Auckland, Rubedo Press, 2018, ISBN 978-0-473-40775-9
- Paul T. Keyser, " Greco-Roman Alchemy and Coins of Imitation Silver ", American Journal of Numismatics 7–8 (1995–1996), p. 209–234.
- Paul Keyser, " The Longue Durée of Alchemy ", in John Scarborough and Paul Keyser (eds.), Oxford Handbook of Science and Medicine in the Classical World, Oxford University Press, 2018, p. 409–430.
- Jean Letrouit, "Chronologie des alchimistes grecs," in Didier Kahn and Sylvain Matton, Alchimie: art, histoire et mythes, SEHA-Archè, 1995, p. 11–93.
- Lindsay, Jack. The Origins of Alchemy in Greco-Roman Egypt. Barnes & Noble, 1970.
- Paul Magdalino and Maria Mavroudi (eds.), The Occult Sciences in Byzantium, La Pomme d'or, 2006.
- Martelli, Matteo (2014). "The Alchemical Art of Dyeing: The Fourfold Division of Alchemy and the Enochian Tradition". Laboratories of Art. Archimedes. Vol. 37. Cham: Springer International Publishing. pp. 1–22. doi:10.1007/978-3-319-05065-2_1. ISBN 978-3-319-05064-5.
- Matteo Martelli, " Alchemy, Medicine and Religion: Zosimus of Panopolis and the Egyptian Priests ", Religion in the Roman Empire 3.2 (2017), p. 202–220.
- Merianos, Gerasimos (2017). "Alchemy". The Cambridge Intellectual History of Byzantium. Cambridge University Press. pp. 234–251. doi:10.1017/9781107300859.015. ISBN 978-1-107-30085-9.
- Greek Alchemy from Late Antiquity to Early Modernity. De Diversis Artibus. Vol. 104. Turnhout: Brepols Publishers. 2018. doi:10.1484/m.dda-eb.5.116173. ISBN 978-2-503-58191-0.
- Daniel Stolzenberg, " Unpropitious Tinctures: Alchemy, Astrology & Gnosis According to Zosimos of Panopolis ", Archives internationales d'histoire des sciences 49 (1999), p. 3–31.
- Cristina Viano, " Byzantine Alchemy, or the Era of Systematization ", in John Scarborough and Paul Keyser (eds.), Oxford Handbook of Science and Medicine in the Classical World, Oxford University Press, 2018, p. 943–964.
- Vlachou, C.; McDonnell, J.G.; Janaway, R.C. (2002). "Experimental investigation of silvering in late Roman coinage". MRS Proceedings. 712 II9.2. doi:10.1557/PROC-712-II9.2. ISSN 0272-9172.

=== Early modern ===
- Principe, Lawrence and William Newman. Alchemy Tried in the Fire: Starkey, Boyle, and the Fate of Helmontian Chymistry. University of Chicago Press, 2002.
