= Chymes =

Greco-Roman alchemist

Chymes (Greek: Χύμης) was a Greco-Roman alchemist who lived before the third century. He is known only through fragments of text in the works of Zosimos of Panopolis and Olympiodorus of Thebes.

Some theorists state that Chymes is the eponymous founder of alchemy. Zosimus associates him with Mary the Jewess. He may likely date from this earliest period of alchemy.

== Etymology ==
Chymes' name has also been recorded as Chemas, Cheimas, Chimes, Chemes, and Chimas. He was referred to by Ibn al-Nadim as both "Kimas" and "Shimas". Jewish-Hellenistic traditions have equated Chymes with Cham, the biblical figure known as Ham (son of Noah). Despite this, Chymes can not been identified with any known personage.

== Fragments ==
One is the All, and it is through it that the All is born. One is the All, and if the All does not contain all, the All will not be born.
