= Cleopatra the Alchemist =

Greek alchemist and writer

Cleopatra the Alchemist Cleopatra the Wise
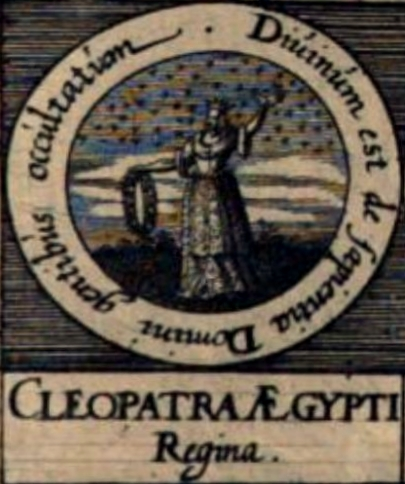
- Imaginative depiction from Mylius' 1618 Basilica philosophica "Seals of the Philosophers"
- Born: c. 3rd century

Philosophical work
- Era: Ancient philosophy
- Region: Western philosophy
- Main interests: Alchemy
- Notable ideas: Alembic

Cleopatra the Alchemist (Greek: Κλεοπάτρα; fl. c. 3rd century AD), also referred to as Cleopatra the Wise, was an Egyptian alchemist, writer, and philosopher, born and raised in Alexandria, Ancient Egypt. She experimented with practical alchemy but is also credited as one of the four female alchemists who could produce the philosopher's stone. Some writers consider her to be the inventor of the alembic, a distillation apparatus.

Cleopatra the Alchemist appears to have been active in Alexandria in the 3rd century or 4th century A.D. She is associated with the school of alchemy typified by Mary the Jewess and Comarius. These alchemists used complex apparatus for distillation and sublimation.

== Identity and misnomers ==
Cleopatra is a pseudonym for an unknown author or group of authors. She is not the same person as Cleopatra VII. Nonetheless, she is referred to as Cleopatra, Queen of Egypt, in some later works. One example of this can be found in Basilica Philosophica by Johann Daniel Mylius (1618), where her seal is pictured alongside the motto: "The divine is hidden from the people according to the wisdom of the Lord". She is also conflated with Cleopatra the Physician. The two supposedly lived during the same time and are said to have similar styles in their writing, both having grand imagery. Cleopatra is used as a character within the dialogue of the alchemical texts themselves.

== Contributions to alchemy ==
Cleopatra was a foundational figure in alchemy, contemporary with or even pre-dating Zosimos of Panopolis. Michael Maier, author of Atalanta Fugiens (1618), names her as one of the four women who knew how to make the philosopher's stone, along with Maria the Jewess, Medera, and Paphnutia. Cleopatra was mentioned with great respect in the Arabic encyclopedia Kitab al-Fihrist from 988. She is sometimes credited with the invention of the alembic. Also trying to quantify alchemy and its experiments, Cleopatra worked with weights and measures.

Three alchemical texts related to Cleopatra survive. The text titled A Dialogue of the Philosophers and Cleopatra exists, but cannot be attributed to her. Jack Lindsay calls this discourse "the most imaginative and deeply felt document left by the alchemist".

- Ἐκ τῶν Κλεοπάτρας περὶ μέτρων καὶ σταθμῶν. ("On Weights and Measures")
- Χρυσοποιία Κλεοπάτρας ("Gold Making of Cleopatra")
- Διάλογος φιλοσόφων καὶ Κλεοπάτρας ("A Dialogue of the Philosophers and Cleopatra")

Cleopatra's use of imagery reflects conception and birth, the renewal and transformation of life. The philosopher alchemist who contemplates their work is compared to a loving mother who thinks about her child and feeds it.

=== Chrysopoeia of Cleopatra ===
Cleopatra is most noted for the Chrysopoeia of Cleopatra (Greek: Χρυσοποιία Κλεοπάτρας), a single sheet document which contains only symbols, drawings and captions (all of which are pictured below). It is first found on a single leaf in a tenth-to-eleventh century manuscript in the Biblioteca Marciana, Venice, MS Marciana gr. Z. 299. A later copy can be found at Leiden University, located in the Netherlands. Chrysopoeia translated is "gold-making".

An example of the imagery is the serpent eating its own tail as a symbol of the eternal return, called the Ouroboros: “a snake curving around with its tail in its mouth (eating itself) is an obvious emblem of unity of the cosmos, of eternity, where the beginning is the end and the end is the beginning". Also on the Chrysopeoia is an inscription in a double ring thus describing the Ouroboros:

One is the Serpent which has its poison according to two compositions, and One is All and through it is All, and by it is All, and if you have not All, All is Nothing.

Within the inscription ring is also symbols for gold, silver, and mercury. Along with those are drawings of a "dibikos" (Greek: διβικός) and an instrument similar to a kerotakis (Greek: κηροτακίς or κυροτακίς), both alchemical apparatuses. Another of her symbols is the eight-banded star. It is believed that the drawing of these star symbols and the crescent shapes above them are a pictorial depiction of turning lead into silver.

Images from Chrysopoeia of Cleopatra
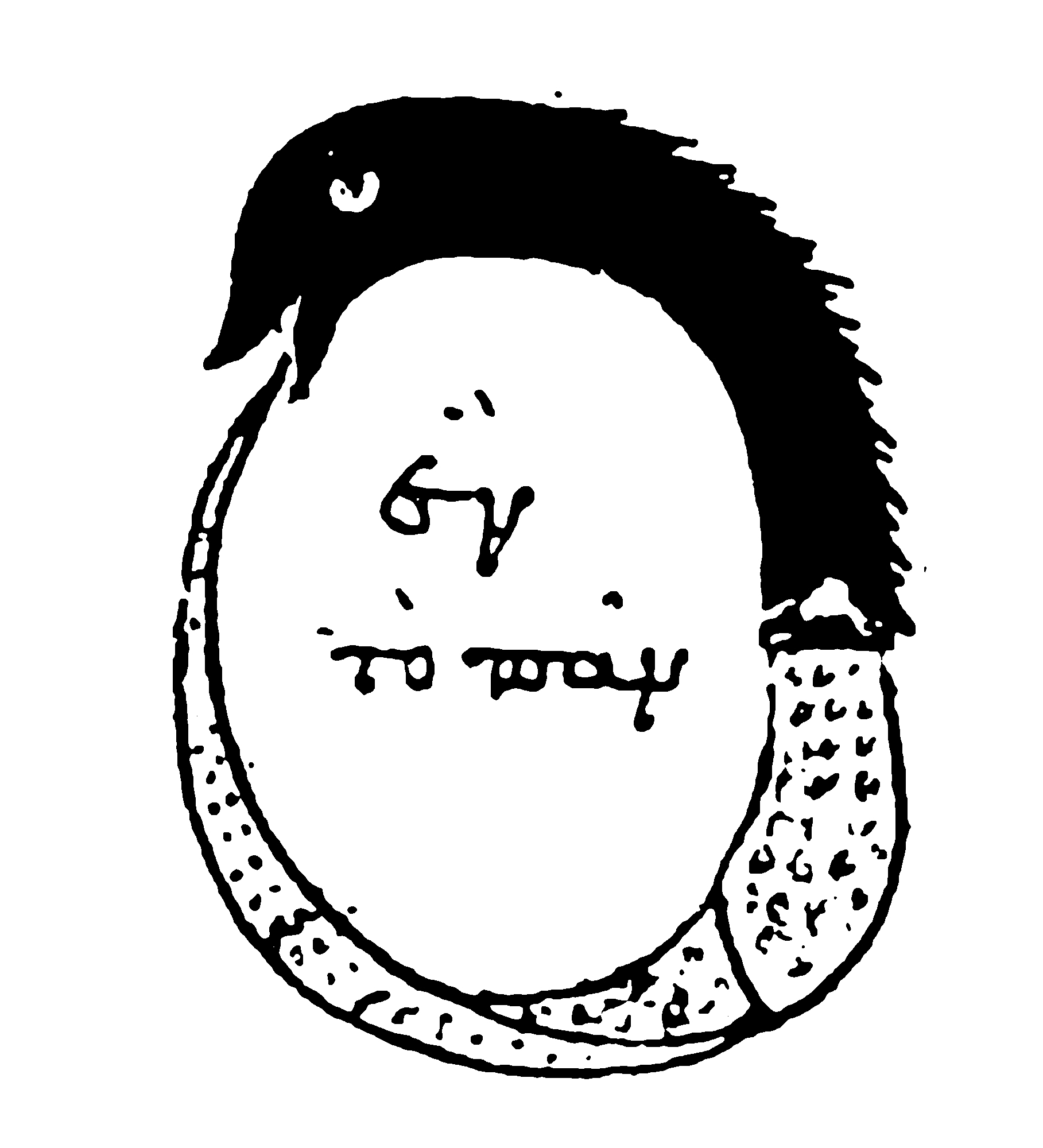

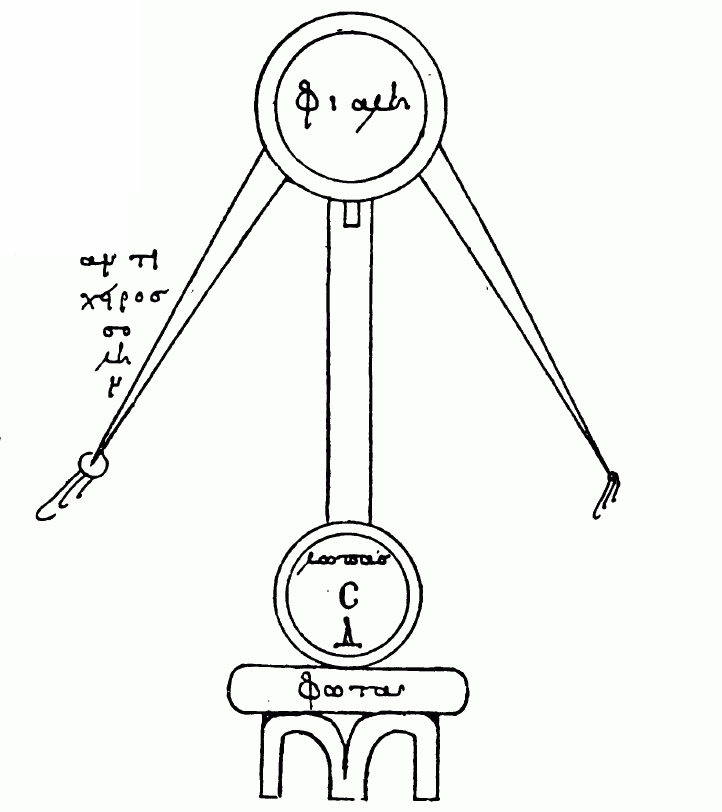

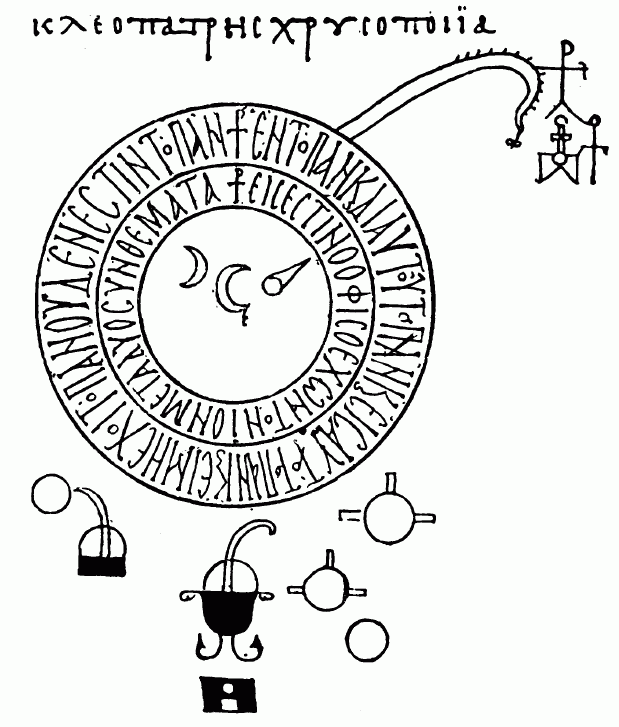

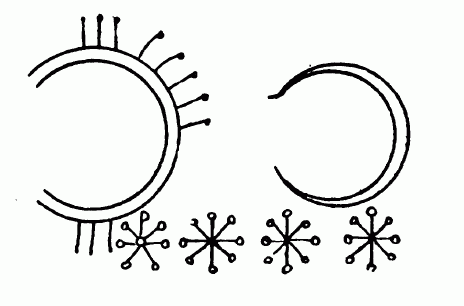
