= Mary the Jewess =

First Western alchemist (1st century)

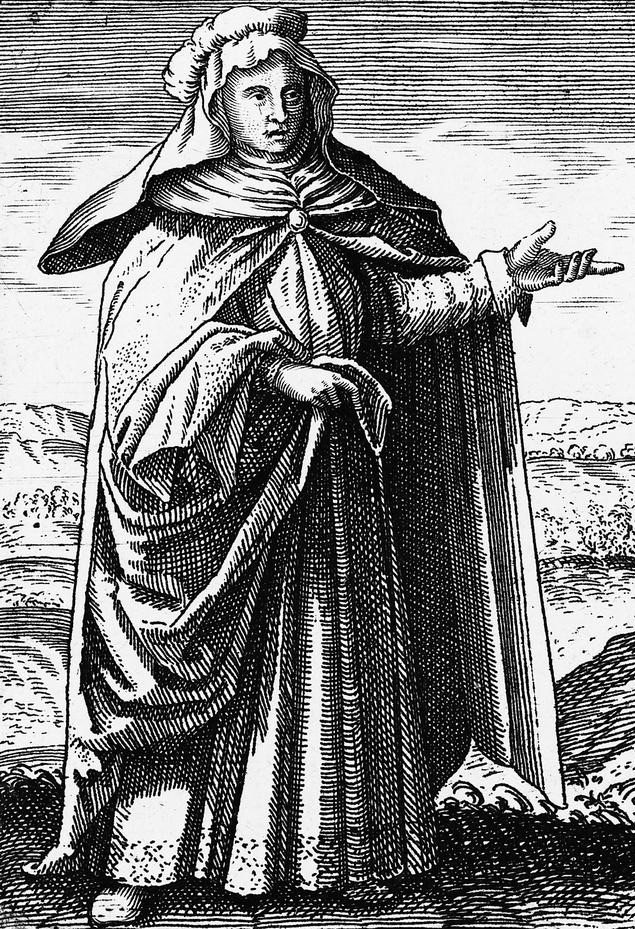
- Engraving depicting Maria Hebraea from Michael Maier's book Symbola Aurea Mensae Duodecim Nationum (1617)
- Other names: Maria the Jewess; Mary the Prophetess; Maria the Copt
- Occupation: Alchemist

Philosophical work
- Notable ideas: Axiom of Maria

Mary or Maria the Jewess (Latin: Maria Hebraea), also known as Mary the Prophetess (Latin: Maria Prophetissa) or Maria the Copt (Arabic: مارية القبطية, romanized: Māriyya al-Qibṭiyya), was an early alchemist known from the works of Zosimos of Panopolis (fl. c. 300 CE) and other authors in the Greek alchemical tradition. On the basis of Zosimos's comments, she lived between the first and third centuries CE in Alexandria. Marilyn French, F. Sherwood Taylor and Edmund Oscar von Lippmann list her as one of the first alchemical writers, dating her works at no later than the first century.

She is credited with the invention of several kinds of chemical apparatus (e.g., the bain-marie) and is considered to be the first true alchemist of the Western world.

Through Zosimos many of the beliefs of Mary the Jewess can be observed. Mary incorporated lifelike attributes into her descriptions of metal such as bodies, souls, and spirits. Mary believed that metals had two different genders, and by joining the two genders together a new entity could be made.

== History ==
The primary source for the existence of "Mary the Jewess" within the context of alchemy is Zosimos of Panopolis, who wrote, in the 4th century, the oldest extant books on alchemy. Zosimos described several of Mary's experiments and instruments. In his writings, Mary is almost always mentioned as having lived in the past, and she is described as "one of the sages".

George Syncellus, a Byzantine chronicler of the 8th century, presented Mary as a teacher of Democritus, whom she had met in Memphis, Egypt, during the time of Pericles.

The 10th century Kitāb al-Fihrist of Ibn al-Nadim cited Mary as one of the 52 most famous alchemists and stated that she was able to prepare caput mortuum, a purple pigment.

The early medieval alchemical text ascribed to an otherwise unknown "Morienus Romanus" called her "Mary the Prophetess", and the Arabs knew her as the "Daughter of Plato" – a name that, in Western alchemical texts, was used for white sulfur.

== Arabic and Latin works ==
Of Mary's Greek works only fragments survive as quoted by Zosimos of Panopolis, pseudo-Olympiodorus and other later authors. However, several Arabic writings attributed to her are extant, some of them also in Latin translations:

- Risālat Māriyya bint Sāba al-malik al-Qibṭī ilā Āras ("Letter of Maria, Daughter of [the Queen of] Sheba, the Copt, to Aras"), also known as Risālat Māriyya ilā Aras wa-su'āluhu wa-jawābuhā lahu ("Letter of Mary to Aras, his Question and her Answer to Him"). This work was translated into Latin as Practica Mariae prophetissae sororis Moysi.
- "The Book of Maria and the Wise Men"
- "The Epistle of the Crown and the Creation of the Newborn Baby"

== Alchemical philosophy ==
=== Axiom of Maria ===
The following was known as the Axiom of Maria:

One becomes two, two becomes three, and out of the third comes the one as the fourth.

Marie-Louise von Franz, an associate of psychologist Carl Jung, gives an alternative version:

Out of the One comes Two, out of Two comes Three, and from the Third comes the One as the Fourth.

Carl Jung used this axiom as a metaphor for wholeness and individuation.

=== Other ===
Several cryptic alchemical precepts have been attributed to Mary. She is said to have spoken of the union of opposites:

Join the male and the female, and you will find what is sought.

== Inventions ==
Mary, along with Agathodaemon, Pseudo-Democritus, and Hermes Trismegistus, was mentioned by Zosimos of Panopolis in his descriptions of certain devices, such as the tribikos, the kerotakis, and the bain-marie. But her contributions are disputed and not clear.

=== Tribikos ===
The tribikos (Greek: τριβικός) was a kind of alembic with three arms that was used to obtain substances purified by distillation. It is not known whether Mary invented it, but Zosimos credits the first description of the instrument to her. It is still used today in chemistry labs. In her writings (quoted by Zosimos), Mary recommends that the copper or bronze used to make the tubes should be the thickness of a frying pan and that the joints between the tubes and the still-head should be sealed with flour paste.

=== Kerotakis ===
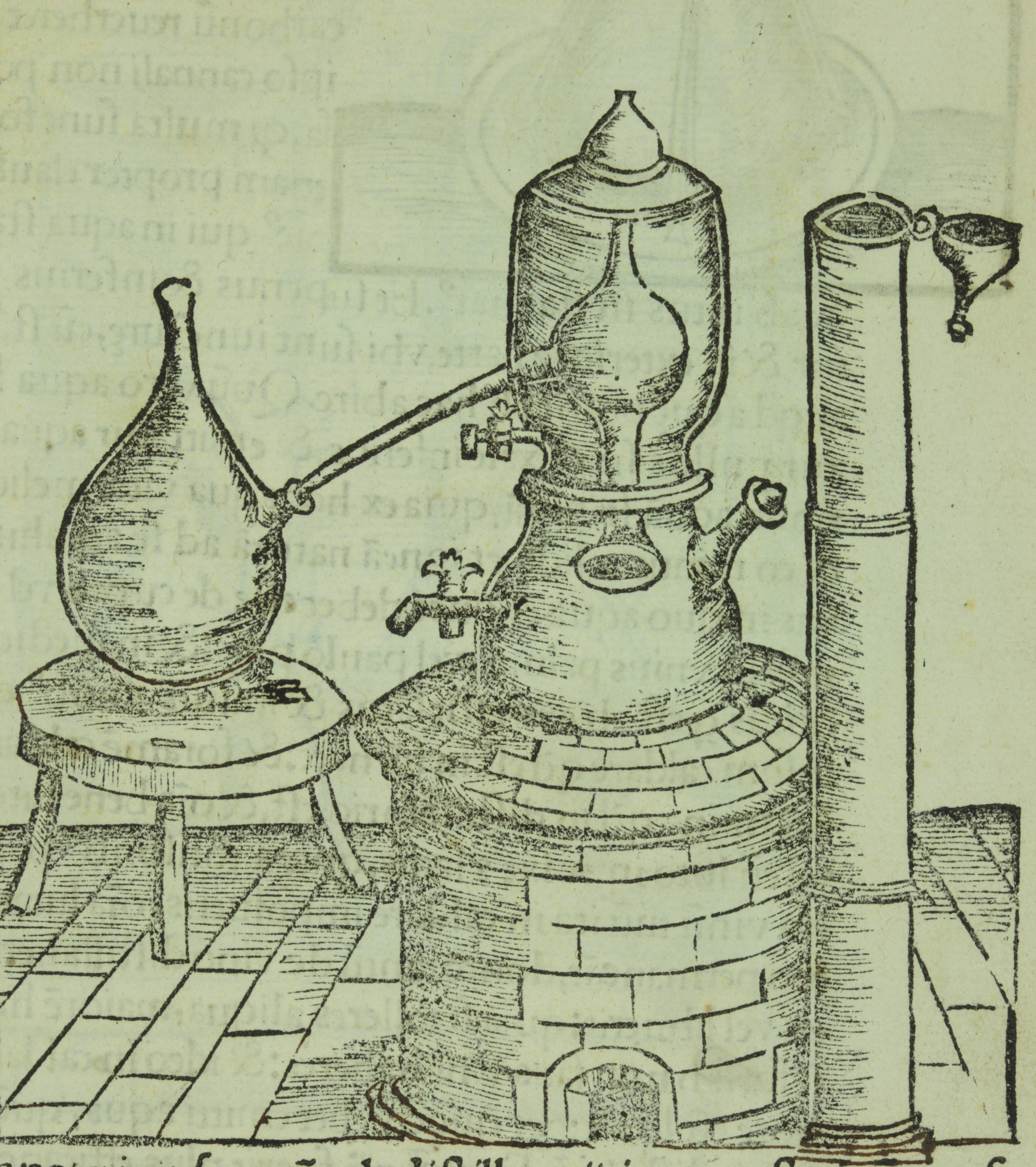
An alchemical balneum Mariae, or Maria’s bath, from Coelum philosophorum, Philip Ulstad, 1528, Science History Institute

The kerotakis (Greek: κηροτακίς or κυροτακίς), is a device used to heat substances used in alchemy and to collect vapors. It is an airtight container with a sheet of copper on its upper side. When working properly, all its joints form a tight vacuum. The use of such sealed containers in the hermetic arts led to the term "hermetically sealed", which is still in use. The kerotakis was said to be a replication of the process of the formation of gold that was occurring in the bowels of the earth.

This instrument was later modified by the German chemist Franz von Soxhlet in 1879 to create the extractor that bears his name, the Soxhlet extractor.

=== Bain-marie ===
Mary's name survives in her invention of the bain-marie (Mary's bath), which limits the maximum temperature of a container and its contents to the boiling point of a separate liquid: essentially a double boiler. It is extensively used in chemical processes for which a gentle heat is necessary. This term was introduced by Arnold of Villanova in the 14th century. The term is still used for a double boiler to cook food in.

== See also ==
- Alchemy
- Cleopatra the Alchemist (Egypt)
- Timeline of women in science
- The Book of Abraham the Jew

== Bibliography ==
- Haeffner, Mark (2004). The Dictionary of Alchemy: From Maria Prophetissa to Isaac Newton. London: Aeon. ISBN 1-904658-12-1. (Paperback edition)
- Holmyard, Eric J. (1927). "An Alchemical Tract Ascribed to Mary the Copt". Archeion. 8 (2): 161–167. doi:10.1484/J.arch.3.256.
- Martelli, Matteo (2022). "Maria's Practica in Early Modern Alchemy". In Antonelli, Francesca; Romano, Antonella; Savoia, Paolo (eds.). Gendered Touch: Women, Men, and Knowledge-making in Early Modern Europe. Leiden: Brill. pp. 40–65. doi:10.1163/9789004512610. ISBN 978-90-04-51260-3. S2CID 246270851.
- Patai, Raphael (1995). The Jewish Alchemists: A History and Source Book. New Jersey: Princeton University Press. pp. 60–91. ISBN 978-0-691-00642-0.
- Raggetti, Lucia (2022). "Maria the Alchemist and Her Famous Heated Bath in the Arabo-Islamic Tradition". In Antonelli, Francesca; Romano, Antonella; Savoia, Paolo (eds.). Gendered Touch: Women, Men, and Knowledge-making in Early Modern Europe. Leiden: Brill. pp. 21–39. doi:10.1163/9789004512610. ISBN 978-90-04-51260-3. S2CID 246270851.
- Ullmann, Manfred (1972). Die Natur- und Geheimwissenschaften im Islam. Leiden: Brill. ISBN 978-90-04-03423-5.
