= Bolus of Mendes =

Bolus of Mendes (Ancient Greek: Βῶλος ὁ Μενδήσιος, Bōlos ho Mendēsios; fl. 3rd century BC) was a philosopher, a neopythagorean writer of works of esoterica and medicine, in Ptolemaic Egypt. Both the Suda, and a later work mistakenly attributed to Eudokia Makrembolitissa—Ἰωνιά; Bed of Violets, probably a 16th-century forgery by Constantine Paleocappa—write of a Pythagorean philosopher of Mendes in Egypt. He is described as one who wrote on marvels, potent remedies, and astronomical phenomena. The Suda, however, also describes a separate Bolus who was a philosopher of the school of Democritus, who wrote Inquiry, and Medical Art, containing "natural medical remedies from some resources of nature." However, from a passage of Columella, it appears that Bolos of Mendes and this other Bolus, follower of Democritus, were one and the same person. He seems to have lived following the time of Theophrastus, whose work Historia Plantarum ('On Plants'), Bolus appears to have known.
