= Paphnutia the Virgin =

Egyptian alchemist

- Known for: Referred to in the letters between the alchemist Zosimos of Panopolis and his student Theosebeia
- Scientific career
- Fields: Alchemy

Paphnutia the Virgin (fl. 300 C.E.) was an Egyptian alchemist living around the time of 300 C.E. who was referred to in the letters between the alchemist Zosimos of Panopolis and his student and "spiritual sister", Theosebeia. Within these letters Zosimos criticizes Theosebeia for talking and exchanging ideas with Paphnutia, considering her someone that was uneducated and who incorrectly practiced alchemy. Little else is known about this ancient alchemist, other than it is thought that Paphnutia could have been connected to a competing school of alchemy than Zosimos, or that she could also have been a priestess.
