= Eric John Holmyard =

English science teacher

Eric John Holmyard (11 July 1891 – 13 October 1959) was an English science teacher at Clifton College, and historian of science and technology.

== Scholar ==
Holmyard studied at Sexey's School, Bruton, and Sidney Sussex College, Cambridge, and was a member of the Royal Asiatic Society. His scholarly work included rectification of accounts of the history of alchemy, particularly in relation with Islamic science. He translated texts from Arabic and Latin, and wrote extensively on Geber. He was responsible with D. C. Mandeville for the re-attribution of the alchemical text De Mineralibus to an origin in Avicenna. Holmyard served as the founding editor of the scientific review and history of science journal Endeavour.

== Textbooks ==
As a textbook author, he pioneered an approach to science teaching that included historical material. "His historicized science books were an enormous and long-term commercial success, with Elementary Chemistry (1925) alone selling half-a-million copies by 1960."

== Teacher ==
He taught both Nevill Mott and Charles Coulson at Clifton, but his personal influence on them as scientists was low (in Coulson's case, even negative). In contrast, he had a great impact on the future geneticist C. H. Waddington, who followed in his footsteps by matriculating at Sidney Sussex College in Cambridge. Holmyard also published a best seller, A Higher School Inorganic Chemistry, along with W.G. Palmer.

== Historical works ==
- Kitab al-‘Ilm al-maktasab fi zira‘at adh-dhahab: Book of knowledge acquired concerning the cultivation of gold by Abu 'l-Qasim Muhammad ibn Ahmad al-‘Iraqi (1923; translator)
- Chemistry to the Time of Dalton (1925)
- Avicenna De congelatione et conglutinatione lapidum (1927; translator with D. C. Mandeville)
- The Works of Geber (1928), with Richard Russell (1678 translator)
- Ordinall of Alchemy by Thomas Norton (1929; facsimile, editor)
- The Great Chemists (1929)
- Makers of Chemistry (1931)
- Ancestors of An Industry: The story of British scientific achievement (1950)
- British Scientists (1951)
- Alchemy (1957)
- A History of Technology (1954-8) five volumes, with Charles Singer
