= Chrysopoeia =

Transmutation into gold

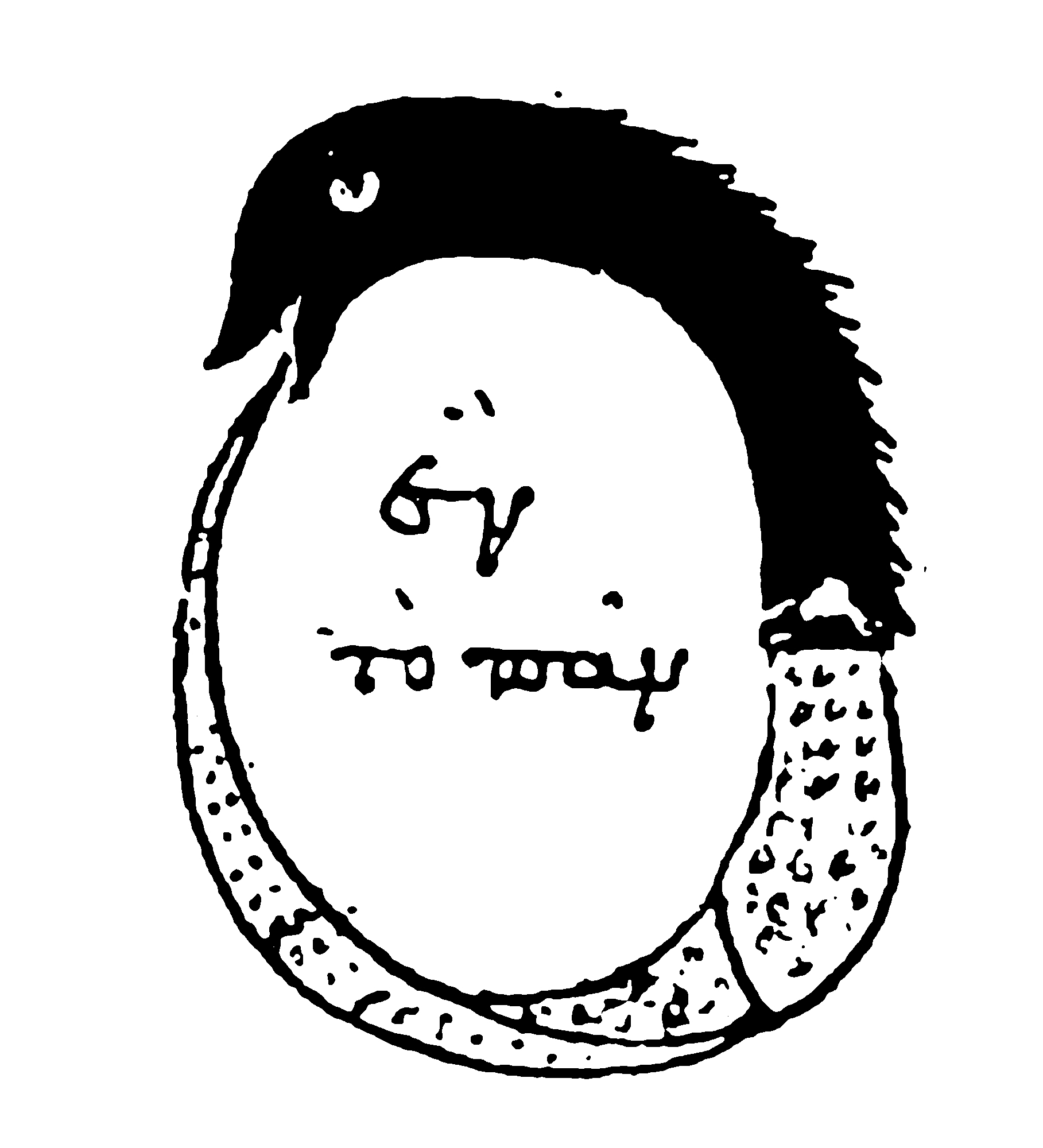
Ouroboros (representation of a serpent eating its own tail) with the words ἕν τὸ πᾶν, hen to pān ("the all is one") from the Chrysopoeia of Cleopatra the Alchemist in the 3rd or 4th century

Chrysopoeia (from Ancient Greek χρυσοποιία (khrusopoiía) 'gold-making') was the purported alchemical production of gold, most commonly by the transmutation of base metals such as lead. It is closely related to argyropoeia (from Ancient Greek ἀργυροποιία (arguropoiía) 'silver-making'), the artificial production of silver, often by transmuting copper. Although alchemists pursued many different goals, chrysopoeia and argyropoeia remained one of the defining ambitions of alchemy throughout its history, from Zosimus of Panopolis (fl. c. 300) to Robert Boyle (1627–1691). Most notably, the ability to produce gold or silver was a characteristic of the philosopher's stone, therefore forming a component of the alchemical Magnum Opus.

The word was used in the title of a brief alchemical work, the Chrysopoeia of Cleopatra attributed to Cleopatra the Alchemist, which was probably written in the first centuries of the Christian era. It was first found on a single leaf of a c. 10th–11th-century manuscript in the Biblioteca Marciana in Venice. The document features an ouroboros containing the words "the all is one" (ἕν τὸ πᾶν, hen to pān), a concept that is related to Hermeticism. Stephen of Alexandria (fl. c. 580 – c. 640) wrote a work called De Chrysopoeia. Chrysopoeia is also the title of a 1515 poem by Giovanni Augurello.

As with many alchemical practices, chrysopoeia had little basis in real chemical science, and may have been discussed in an allegorical or religious context rather than as a genuine physical practice. The feat of artificially creating gold was instead not achieved until 1941, at Harvard University, with the neutron bombardment of mercury samples, and in 1980 with the carbon and neon nucleus bombardment of bismuth-209 atoms by a team including Glenn T. Seaborg, K. Aleklett and others at Lawrence Berkeley National Laboratory. In 2002 and 2004, the Super Proton Synchrotron team at CERN reported turning lead nuclei into gold nuclei through deliberate near-miss collisions inducing photon exchanges. In 2022, CERN scientists at ISOLDE reported producing 18 gold nuclei from proton bombardment of a uranium target. In 2025, the ALICE experiment team at the Large Hadron Collider reported producing more gold from the 2002 SPS team's mechanism at higher energies in the late 2010s.

== Other images from the Chrysopoeia of Cleopatra ==
Images from Chrysopeoia of Cleopatra
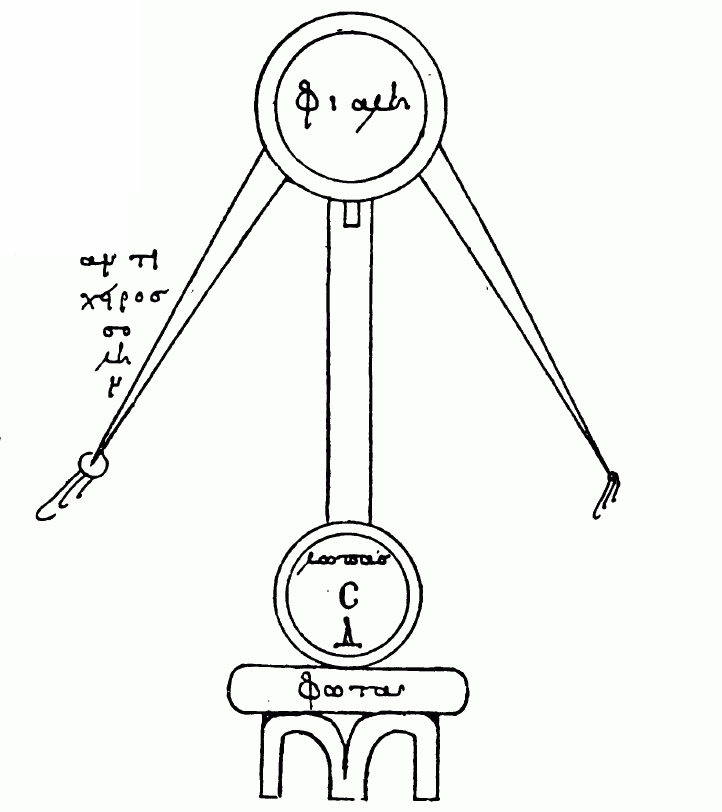

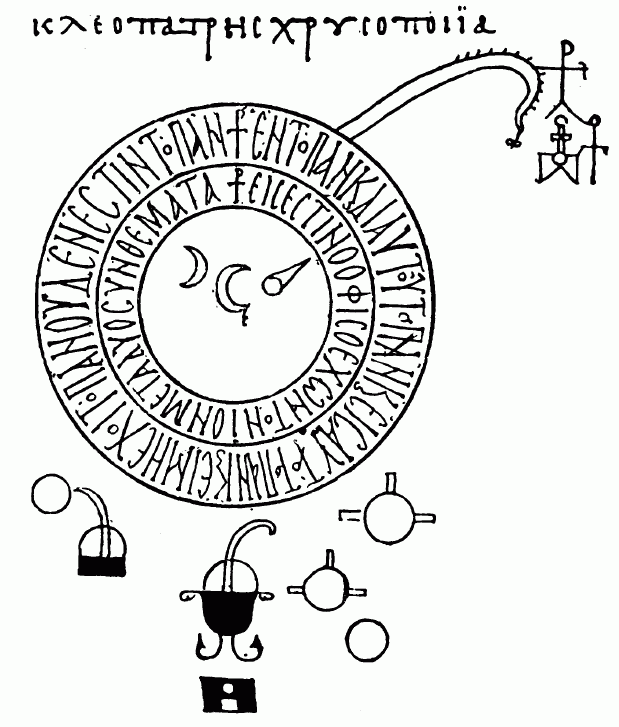

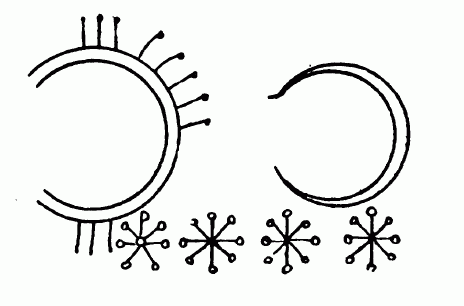

== Modern synthesis of gold atoms ==
It is possible to synthesize gold in particle accelerators or nuclear reactors, although the production cost is estimated to be a trillion times the market price of gold. Since there is only one stable gold isotope, ^{197}Au, nuclear reactions must create this isotope in order to produce usable gold.

Gold was synthesized from mercury by neutron bombardment within the cyclotron at Harvard University in 1941, but the isotopes of gold produced were all radioactive. In 1980, Glenn Seaborg transmuted several thousand atoms of bismuth into gold at the Lawrence Berkeley Laboratory. His experimental technique was able to remove protons and neutrons from the bismuth atoms. However, this technique is far too expensive to enable the routine manufacture of gold.

In 2002 and 2004, CERN scientists at the Super Proton Synchrotron reported producing a minuscule amount of gold nuclei from lead nuclei, by inducing photon emissions within deliberate near-miss collisions of the lead nuclei. In 2022, CERN scientists at ISOLDE reported producing 18 gold nuclei from proton bombardment of a uranium target. In 2025, CERN's ALICE experiment team announced that in the previous decade, they had used the Large Hadron Collider to replicate the 2002 SPS experiments at higher energies. A total of roughly 260 billion gold nuclei were created over three experiment runs, a minuscule amount equivalent to about 90 picograms.

Startup Marathon Fusion proposes a theoretical way to make gold from mercury: use a nuclear fusion reactor to bombard mercury with high-energy neutrons, specifically ^{198}Hg, an isotope with 10% abundance. This creates the unstable ^{197}Hg, which then decays into stable gold (^{197}Au) with a half-life of approximately 64 hours.

== See also ==
- Magnum opus
- Philosophers' stone
- Nuclear transmutation
