= Outline of alchemy =

Overview of and topical guide to alchemy

The following outline is provided as an overview of and topical guide to alchemy:

Alchemy – A philosophical tradition recognized as protoscience, that includes the application of Hermetic principles, and practices related to mythology, religion, and spirituality.

== Branches ==
- Alchemy and chemistry in medieval Islam
- Chinese Alchemy
  - Neidan
  - Processing (Chinese materia medica)
- Iatrochemistry
  - Spagyric
- New Age
- Psychoanalysis
  - Analytical psychology
    - Individuation
  - Metacognition
- Rasayana

=== Influences ===
Influences upon alchemy – alchemy developed dependent on a number of influences and experienced regional and period-specific variations:

- Aristotelianism
- Esotericism
  - Western Esotericism
    - Esoteric Christianity
- Gnosticism
- Hermeticism
- Humorism
- Metallurgy
  - History of metallurgy in the Indian subcontinent
- Platonism
  - Neoplatonism
- Pseudoscience
- Pythagoreanism
- Taoism
- Stoicism

=== Related fields ===
- Anthroposophy
- Astrology
- Ayurveda
- Homeopathy
- Kayaku-Jutsu
- Magic, magick
- Moxibustion
- Tay al-Ard
- Yoga Nidra

== Concepts ==
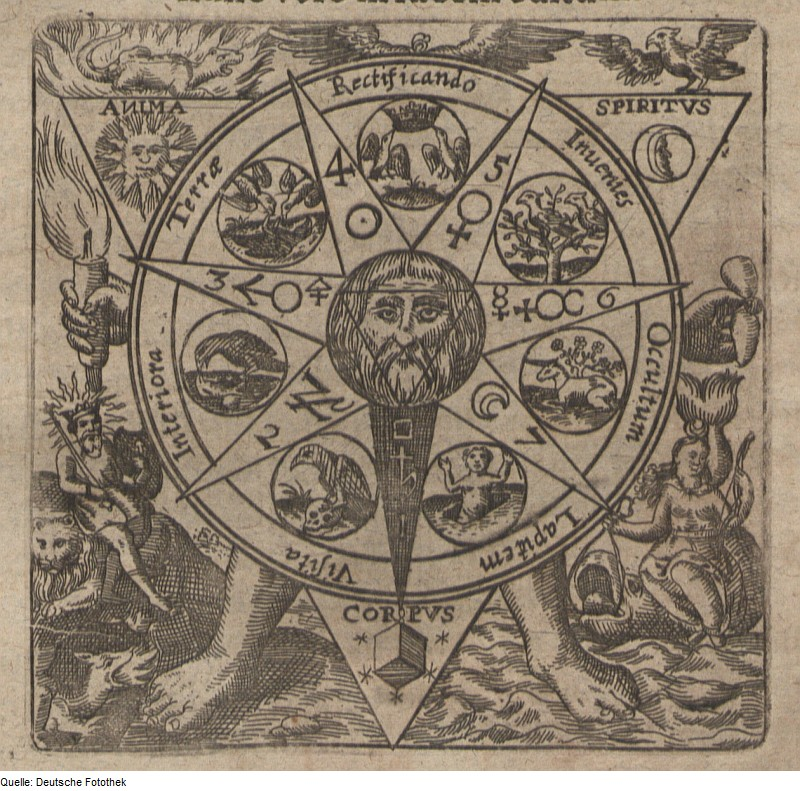
Mandala from the Musaeum Hermeticum incorporating the septenary, four elements, tria prima, and hieros gamos

- Alchemical elements – Primarily the four Classical elements of:
  - Fire (classical element)
  - Water (classical element)
  - Earth (classical element)
  - Air (classical element)
  - For variations see: Wu Xing • Mahābhūta • Five elements (Japanese philosophy)
- Alchemy in art and entertainment
- Alkahest
- Anima mundi
- Chrysopoeia
- Filius philosophorum
- Takwin
  - Homunculus
- Philosopher's stone
  - Cintamani
  - Elixir of life
  - Panacea
- Prima materia
  - Yliaster
- Septenary of the seven metals and Classical planets in Western alchemy
  - Lead • tin • copper • iron • mercury • silver • gold
  - Saturn • Jupiter • Venus • Mars • Mercury • Moon • Sun
- Tria Prima (three primes)
  - Salt • mercury • sulfur
  - Body • soul • spirit
- Unity of opposites or coincidentia oppositorum
  - Hieros Gamos
  - Rebis

== Processes ==
Magnum opus – great work of alchemy consisting of:

- Nigredo
- Albedo
- Citrinitas (sometimes excluded)
- Rubedo

Alchemists also engaged in practical and symbolic processes including:

- Calcination
- Ceration
- Cohobation
- Congelation
- Digestion
- Distillation
- Fermentation
- Filtration
- Fixation
- Multiplication
- Projection
- Solution
- Sublimation

== Symbolism ==
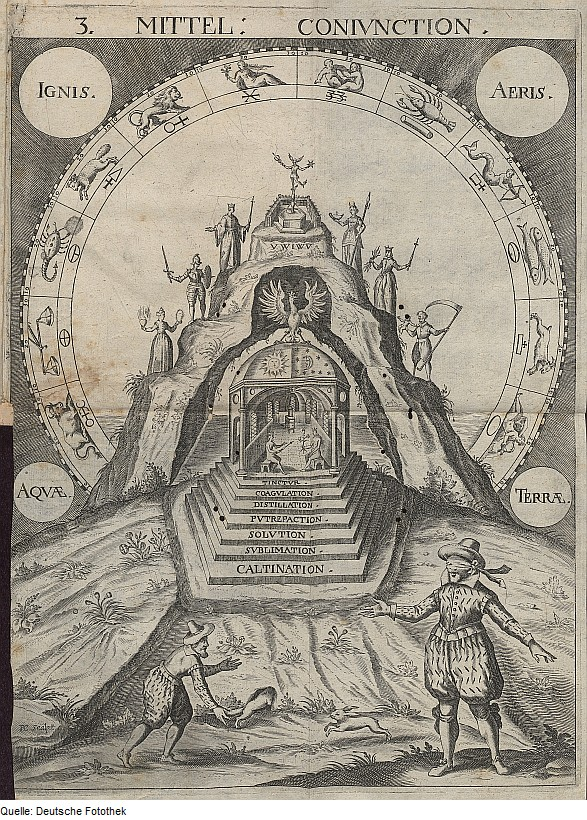
Mandala illustrating key alchemical concepts, symbols, and processes. From Spiegel der Kunst und Natur.

Alchemical symbol –

1. Glyphs

- AGLA
- Monas Hieroglyphica

2. Imagery

- Suns in alchemy
- Undine (alchemy)

3. Visual Symbolism

- Porta Alchemica
- Serpent (symbolism)
  - Caduceus
  - Ouroboros
  - Nehushtan

== Scientific connections ==
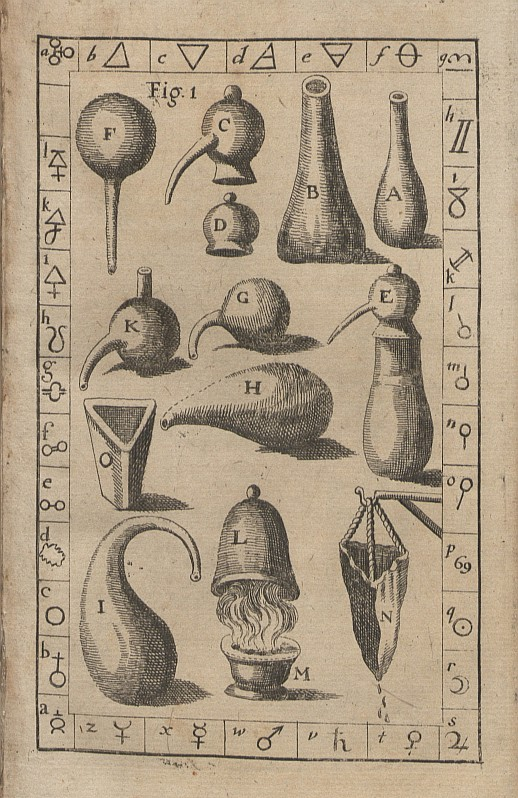
Alchemical apparatus. (Carlo Lancillotti, 1681.)

- Biological transmutation
- Chemistry
- Historicism
- Nuclear transmutation
- Obsolete scientific theories
- Physics
- Scientific method
- Synthesis of noble metals

=== Substances of the alchemists ===
- phosphorus • sulfur (sulphur) • arsenic • antimony
- vitriol • quartz • cinnabar • pyrites • orpiment • galena
- magnesia • lime • potash • natron • saltpetre • kohl
- ammonia • ammonium chloride • alcohol • camphor
- sulfuric acid (sulphuric acid) • hydrochloric acid • nitric acid • acetic acid • formic acid • citric acid • tartaric acid
- aqua regia • gunpowder
- blue vitriol • green vitriol • vinegar • salt

more...

=== Apparatus ===
Stills

- Alembic
- Retort
  - Retort stand

Vessels

- Aludel
- Crucible
  - Hessian crucible
- Cupels
- Mortar and pestle

Heating devices

- Athanor
- Bain-marie
- Sand bath

== Alchemy organizations ==
- Bibliotheca Philosophica Hermetica
- European Society for the Study of Western Esotericism
- Freemasonry
- Rosicrucianism

== Alchemical texts ==
- Axiom of Maria
- Alchemical Studies (Carl Jung)
- Aurora consurgens
- Buch der heiligen Dreifaltigkeit
- Cantong qi
- Chymical Wedding of Christian Rosenkreutz
- Hermetica
  - Emerald Tablet
  - Sirr al-khalīqa ("The Secret of Creation")
- The Hermetical Triumph
- Fasciculus Chemicus
- Musaeum Hermeticum
- Mutus Liber
- Rosary of the Philosophers
- Splendor Solis
- Theatrum Chemicum
- Theatrum Chemicum Britannicum
- The Mirror of Alchimy
- Turba Philosophorum

=== Journals ===
- Ambix
- Aries
- Early Science and Medicine
- Isis

== Alchemists ==
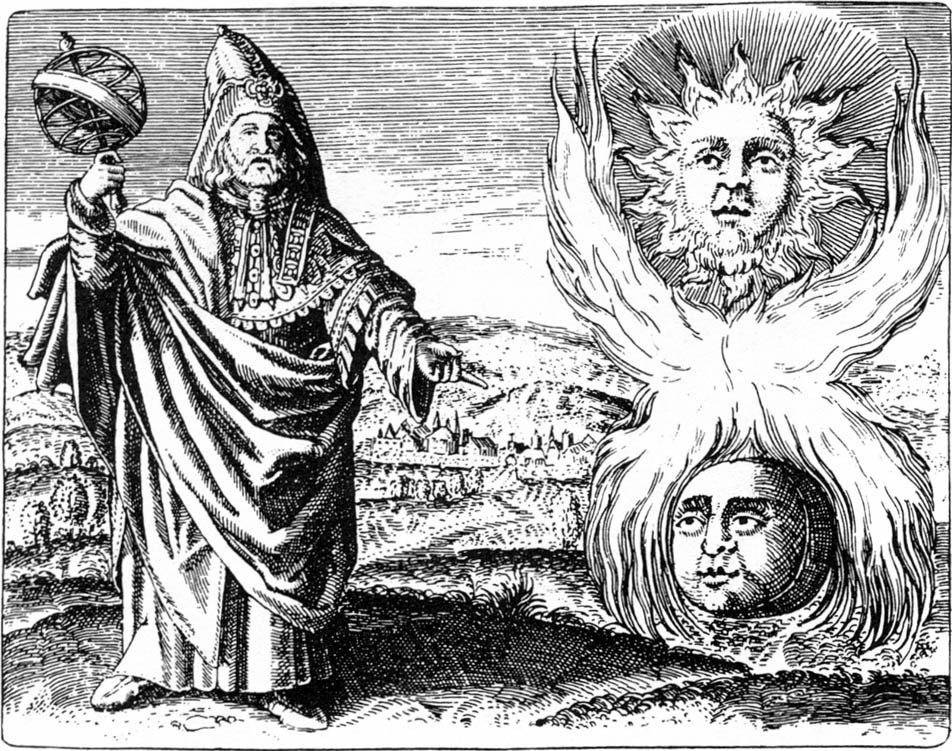
Hermes Trismegistus – traditionally credited as the author of the Hermetica and legendary founder of Western alchemy. (Maier, 1617)

The most influential names in the history of alchemy include:

- Hermes Trismegistus – by tradition, the founder of Western alchemy; many alchemical works were attributed to him.
- Wei Boyang – authored the earliest known book on theoretical alchemy in China.
- Pseudo-Democritus – anonymous author of the oldest extant works of Greco-Egyptian alchemy.
- Zosimos of Panopolis – influential Greco-Egyptian alchemist.
- Khālid ibn Yazīd – credited with introducing alchemy to the Islamic world.
- Pseudo-Apollonius of Tyana – earliest known source of the sulfur-mercury theory of metals and the Emerald Tablet.
- Jābir ibn Hayyān – notable for the theory of the balance (ʿilm al-mīzān), the theory of artificial generation (ʿilm al-takwīn), and a general emphasis on experimental science.
  - Pseudo-Geber – later Latin alchemist who wrote the influential Summa perfectionis.
- Roger Bacon – staunch proponent of the use of alchemy.
- Paracelsus – developer of iatrochemistry.
- Robert Boyle – alchemist critical of Paracelsus, credited as the father of modern chemistry.
- Mary Anne Atwood – key figure in the occult revival of alchemy.
- Carl Jung – merged alchemy and psychoanalytic thought.

== See also ==
- Outline of chemistry
- Outline of medicine
