= Rebis =

Concept in alchemy

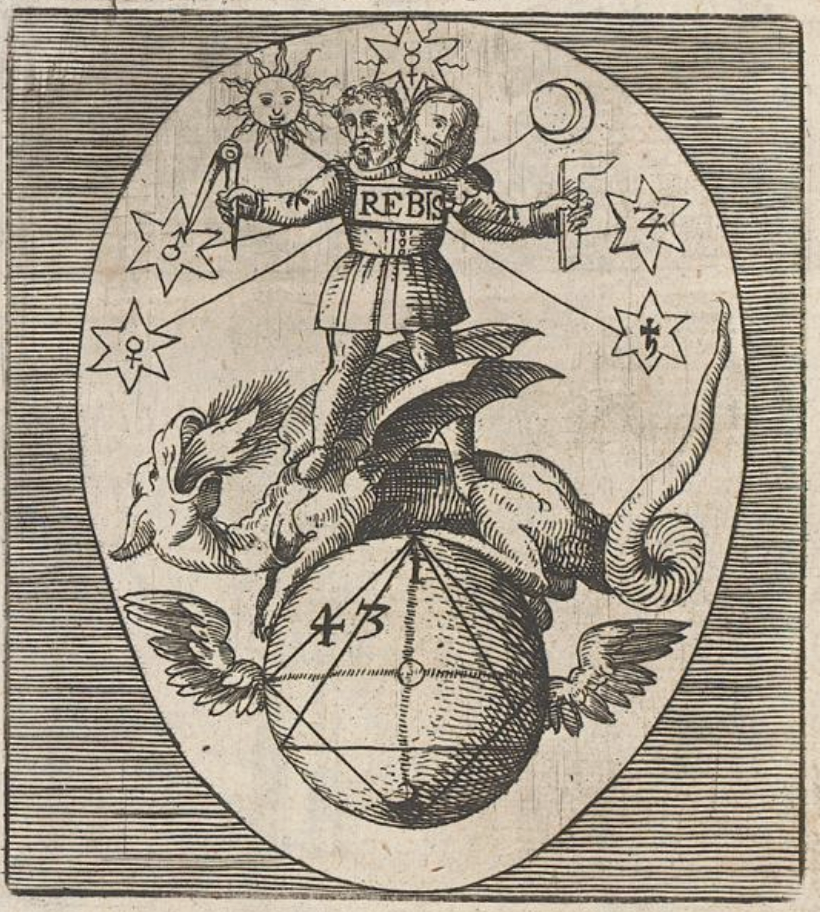
Rebis from the Viatorium Spagyricum (1625)

The Rebis (from the Latin res bina, meaning dual or double matter) is variably identified as either or both the end product of the alchemical magnum opus (or great work) or/and the initial state of matter. It is heavily associated with the principle of hermaphroditism, or the combination of the male and female sexes into one being.

The Rebis is sometimes associated with the primordial state of the world, or the prima materia. While described methods to create the Rebis vary in their specifics, a common theme is the putrefaction of a starting matter into the chaos of nigredo. This is followed by its separation into its parts, such as masculine or feminine. This phase is also called albedo. Finally, the parts are recombined into a whole, achieving the Rebis.

The Rebis is associated both with divinity and with hermaphroditism, so it is sometimes called the "divine hermaphrodite." Generally, the Rebis is a symbol of the coniunctio, or the conjunction of opposites, which formed a key role in alchemical philosophy. Such opposites include male and female, left and right,, body and spirit,, air and fire, and sun and moon (where the sun corresponds to the male and the moon corresponds to the female). The Red King and White Queen are similarly associated.

The Rebis image appeared in the work Azoth of the Philosophers by Basil Valentine in 1613.

== See also ==
- Adam Kadmon
- Androgyny
- Hieros gamos
- Unity of opposites

== Sources ==
- Robert Allen Bartlett, Real Alchemy: A Primer of Practical Alchemy, Hays (Nicolas) Ltd, 2009, ISBN 978-0-8925-4150-8
- Barbara DiBernard, Alchemy and Finnegans Wake, Suny Press, 1980, p. 71, ISBN 978-0-87395-429-7
- Heinrich Jamsthaler, Viatorum spagyricum, Frankfurt a. M, Germany, 1625
- Jung, C.G. (1969) [1951], "The Psychology of the Child Archetype", in Adler, Gerhard; Hull, R.F.C. (eds.), The Archetypes and the Collective Unconscious, The Collected Works of C.G. Jung, vol. 9, part 1 (2nd ed.), Princeton University Press, pp. 173–176, ISBN 978-0-691-01833-1
- Long, Kathleen P. (2006). Hermaphrodites in Renaissance Europe. London: Routledge. doi:10.4324/9781315253367. ISBN 9781315253367.
- Heinrich Nollius, Theoria philosophiae hermetica, Hanau, 1617
- Pagel, Walter (1 October 1960). "Paracelsus and the Neoplatonic and Gnostic Tradition". Ambix. 8 (3): 125–166. doi:10.1179/amb.1960.8.3.125. ISSN 0002-6980.
- Pagel, Walter; Winder, Marianne (1 November 1974). "The Higher Elements and Prime Matter in Renaissance Naturalism and in Paracelsus". Ambix. 21 (2–3): 93–127. doi:10.1179/000269874790223623. ISSN 0002-6980.
- Alexander Roob, Alchimie et mystique: le musée hermétique, Taschen GmbH, 2006, p. 494, ISBN 978-3-8228-5037-4
- Murray Stein, Transformation: Emergence of the Self, Princeton University Press, 1989, p. 101
- Lazarus Zetzner, Theatrum Chemicum, Strasbourg, 1661
