= Suns in alchemy =

Sun symbols have a variety of uses

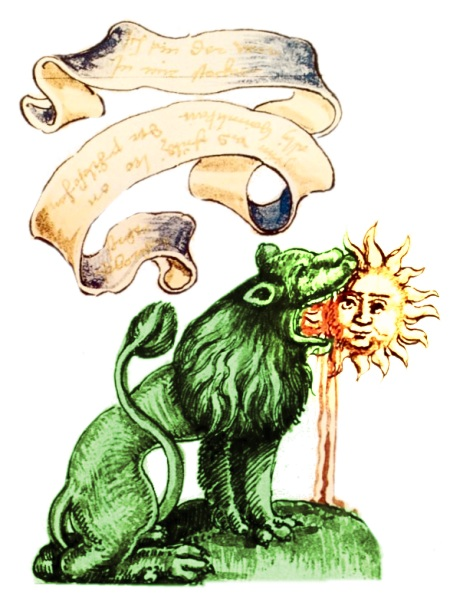
A green lion consuming the Sun is a common alchemical image and is seen in texts such as the Rosary of the Philosophers. The symbol is a metaphor for aqua regia (the green lion) consuming matter (the Sun), gold.

In alchemical and Hermetic traditions, suns are used to symbolize a variety of concepts, much like the Sun in astrology. Suns can correspond to gold, citrinitas, generative masculine principles, imagery of "the king", or Apollo, the fiery spirit or sulfur, the divine spark in man, nobility, or incorruptibility. Recurring images of specific solar motifs can be found in the form of a "dark" or "black sun", or a green lion devouring the Sun.

== Sol niger ==
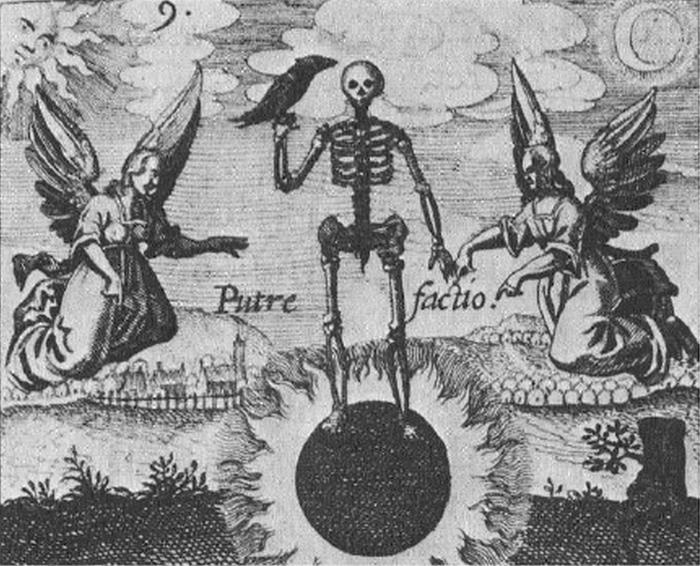
The black sun as pictured in the Putrifaction emblem of Philosophia Reformata (Johann Daniel Mylius)

Sol niger (black sun) can refer to the first stage of the alchemical magnum opus, the nigredo (blackness). In a text ascribed to Marsilio Ficino three suns are described: black, white, and red, corresponding to the three most used alchemical color stages. Of the sol niger he writes:

The body must be dissolved in the subtlest middle air: The body is also dissolved by its own heat and humidity; where the soul, the middle nature holds the principality in the colour of blackness all in the glass: which blackness of Nature the ancient Philosophers called the crows head, or the black sun.

— Marsilius Ficinus, "Liber de Arte Chemica"

The black sun is used to illuminate the dissolution of the body, a blackening of matter, or putrefaction in Splendor Solis, and Johann Daniel Mylius’ Philosophia Reformata.

== See also ==
The alchemical glyph used to represent the Sun

- Alchemical symbol
- Classical planets in Western alchemy
- Solar symbol
