= Multiplication (alchemy) =

Alchemical process

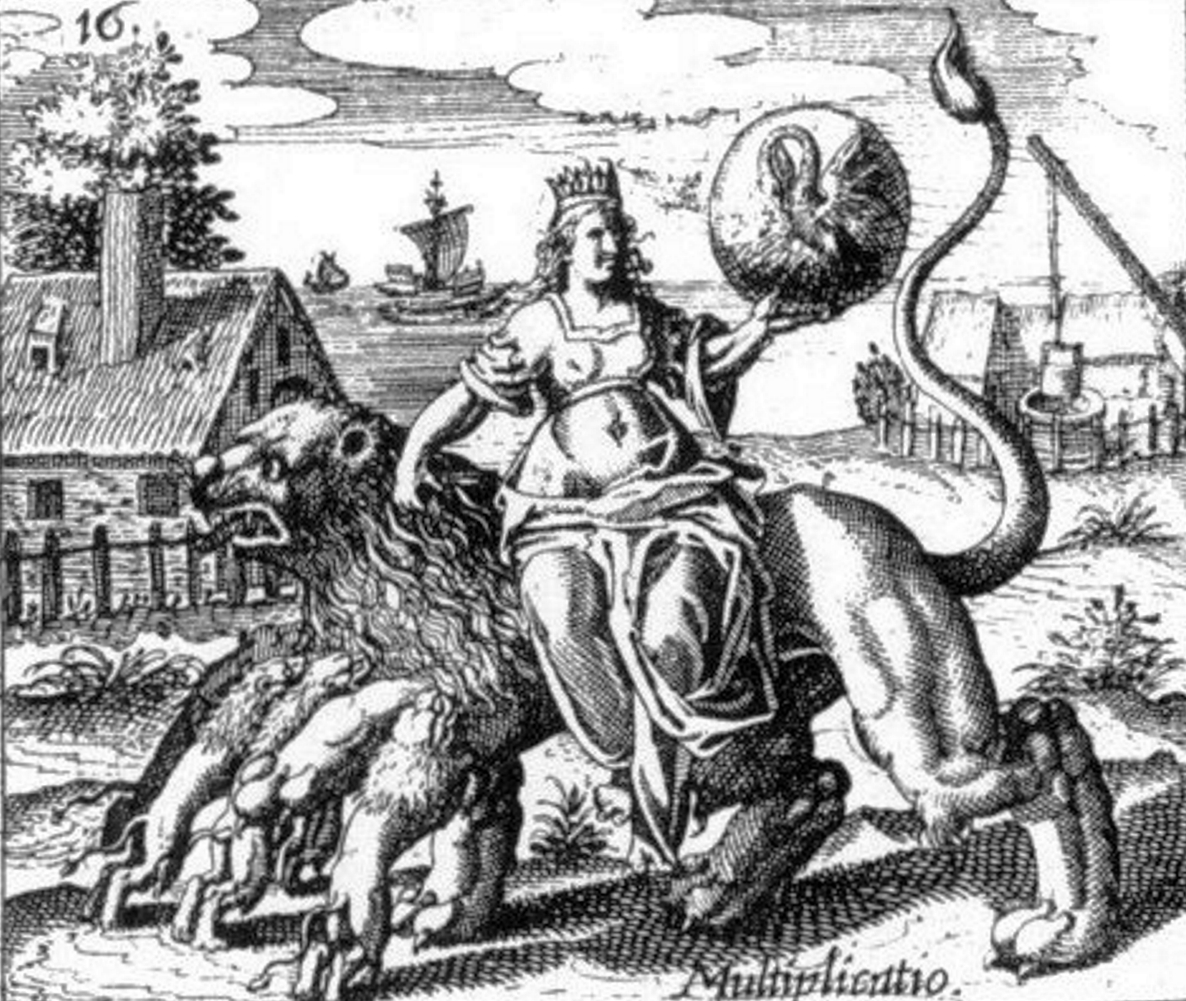
'Multiplicatio' emblem from Philosophia Reformata (Johann Daniel Mylius, 1622). Here, multiplication is illustrated using images of a pelican and a lion feeding their young.

Multiplication is the process in Western alchemy used to increase the potency of the philosopher's stone, elixir or projection powder. It occurs near the end of the magnum opus in order to increase the gains in the subsequent projection. George Ripley gives the following definition of multiplication:

Augmentation it is of the Elixer indeede,
In goodnes and quantitie both for white and red
Multiplication is therefore as they doe write,
That thing that doth augment medicines in each degree,
In colour, in odour, in vertue and also in quantitee.

Multiplication was also used to describe the facet of alchemy chiefly concerned with the reproduction of physical gold and silver. Such is the case in Henry IV's 1404 statute against the craft of multiplication (5 Hen. 4. c. 4). Henry VI began to issue patents for the practice of alchemy, but the act of Parliament against multipliers was not repealed until 1689.

== Method ==
In his discussion of multiplication, Ripley goes on to compare the medicine or elixir to fire. He notes that the methods of multiplication are related to the processes of congelation, cibation, and fermentation. In doing so he also hints at multiplication's internal significance.

And why may you multiply this medicine infinitely,
Forsooth the cause is this,
For it is fire, which kindled will never die,
Dwelling with you, as fire does in houses,
Of which one spark may make more fire this way,
As musk in pigments and other spices more,
In virtue multiplied, and our medicine right so.[...]

Keep in your fire therefore both morning and evening,
So that you do not need to run from house to house,
Among thy neighbours to seek or borrow your fire ,
The more you keep, the more good shall you win,
Multiplying it always more and more within your glass,
By feeding with Mercury unto your lives end,
So shall you have more than you need to spend.

Like Ripley, other sources describe multiplication as subjecting the philosopher's stone to further maturation by reiterating the same processes as was used to originally make it. Sendivogius writes, "Having made an End with the Composition of the Lapis, there remains its Multiplication in infinitum which is effected by the same way and with the same operations the Lapis was made; only that instead of dissolved Gold or Silver, you lay in only so much of the Lapis as you laid in before of the said Gold or Silver for the first Confection of the Lapis." Comparisons to plant and animal reproduction were also made.
