= Eugène Canseliet =

French writer and alchemist

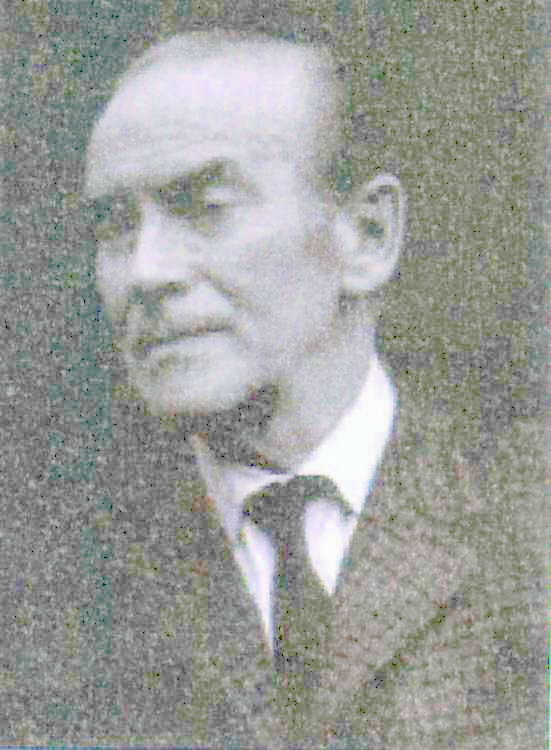
Eugène Canseliet

Eugène Léon Canseliet (18 December 1899, Sarcelles – 12 April 1982, Savignies), was a French writer and alchemist. He was a student of the mysterious alchemist known as Fulcanelli. He wrote the preface for each of his master's books (Le Mystère des cathédrales and Les Demeures philosophales). Later in his life after his master died, he took a quiet life in France and continued to study and practice what Fulcanelli taught him, taking on students.

Though Canseliet took on students and chose to pass on much of the alchemical knowledge imparted to him by Fulcanelli, Canseliet chose universities and less esoteric intellectual circles than his master, and simply passed on knowledge relating to the Opus Minor choosing to keep the discretion customary of the great Hermetic Initiates.

Canseliet met with the late Frater Albertus, a German-American alchemist who practiced in Salt Lake City, Utah. According to Albertus, it was Canseliet who taught him the principle secret needed to perform the Magnum Opus. Canseliet believed, by way of Fulcanelli's teaching, that the only true method was the Dry Way, particularly the Star Regulus of Antimony, the path that Fulcanelli himself likely used. Some believe that Eugene Canseliet was actually Fulcanelli, but this is unlikely considering Canseliet's exceedingly young age at the time of the publishing of Mystery of the Cathedrals and Dwellings of the Philosophers. This is further expounded by the vast historical, chemical, hermetic, and architectural knowledge possessed by the Initiate, Fulcanelli. Patrick Rivière wrote a book purportedly revealing the true identity of Fulcanelli to be a well to do Parisian physicist who was good friends with Pierre Curie. Canseliet supported this claim of acquaintance, saying that Fulcanelli had many well to do aristocratic colleagues and acquaintances.

== Selected works ==
- Deux logis alchimiques, en marge de la science et de l'histoire. Paris, Jean Schemit, 1945, in-8, 157 p. Nouvelle édition augmentée à Paris, chez Jean-Jacques Pauvert, 1979, 344 p.
- Alchimie, études diverses de symbolisme hermétique et de pratique philosophale, Paris, Jean-Jacques Pauvert, 1964, in-8, 285 p. Nouvelle édition revue et augmentée, Paris, Jean-Jacques Pauvert, 1978, 401 p.
- L'Alchimie et son ″Livre muet" (″Mutus Liber″). Introduction et commentaires par Eugène Canseliet, Paris, Jean-Jacques Pauvert, 1967, in-4, 140 p.
- L'Alchimie expliquée sur ses textes classiques, Paris, Jean-Jacques Pauvert, 1972, 312 p.

== Bibliography ==
- La Tourbe des Philosophes, "Hommage aux 80 ans de Eugène CANSELIET", n°10, Grenoble, Editions de la Tourbe.
