= The Hermetical Triumph =

18th-century alchemical text

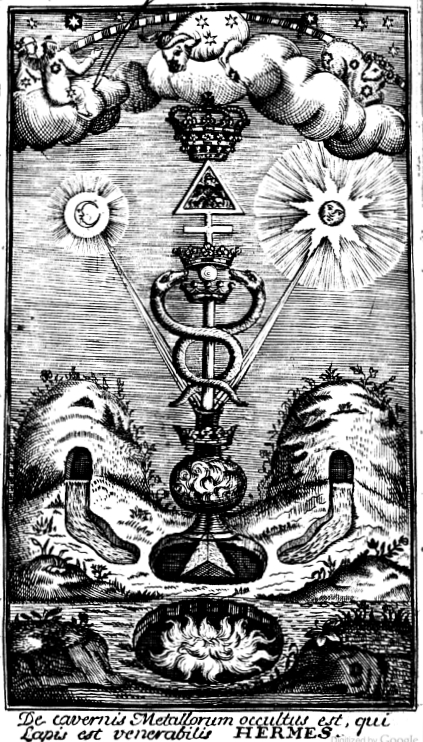
Frontispiece from The Hermetical Triumph

The Hermetical Triumph: or, The Victorious Philosophical Stone. is an alchemical text published in London in 1723 by P. Hanet. It is subtitled "A Treatise more compleat and more intelligible than any has been yet, concerning The Hermetical Magistery". Its subject matter centres around an early seventeenth century German dialogue, The Ancient War of the Knights. A commentary is included.

== Textual history ==
The Ancient War of the Knights was composed in German by an unknown author. It appeared in print at Leipzig, in 1604.

In 1689, Alexandre-Toussaint de Limojon de Saint-Didier made the French translation as Le triomphe hermetique, ou La pierre philosophale victorieuse (Amsterdam: chez Henry Wetstein). The French text was included in the Bibliothèque des Philosophes Chimiques (1672–73).

Another English edition was printed by F. Noble of London in 1740.

== Contents ==
In The Ancient War of the Knights, a debate takes place between gold, mercury and the philosopher's stone. Mercury only plays a minor part in the discourse. Two translations appear in the Hermetic Triumph. The first of these was translated from the original German into Latin, then French, and then finally English. The second "revised version" was translated directly from German into English.

The Hermetic Triumph also contains a discourse between "Eudoxes and Pyrophilus upon the Ancient War of the Knights". Composed as a dialogue between the characters of Eudoxes and Pyrophilus, it serves as a commentary on the main text of the book.
