= Yliaster =

Concept in Alchemy

Yliaster or Iliaster, a term coined by Paracelsus, refers to "prime matter, consisting of body and soul".

Paracelsus described the Iliaster as the "completely healed human being who has burned away all the dross of his lower being and is free to fly as the Phoenix." It is most likely a portmanteau of the Greek hyle (matter) and Latin astrum (star). To Paracelsus, the Iliaster represented the two basic compounds of the cosmos, matter representing "below", and the stars representing "above". Paracelsus says this of the Yliaster while describing how fossils are trapped in wood:

Accordingly, the first body, the Yliaster, was nothing but a clod which contained all the chaos, all the waters, all minerals, all herbs, all stones, all gems. Only the supreme Master could release them and form them with tender solicitude, so that other things could be created from the rest.

In this sense, the Yliaster is the same as the Prima Materia. It is the formless base of all matter which is the raw material for the alchemical Great Work.
