= Conrad Khunrath =

German merchant, alchemist, mint worker, doctor, author, editor, and translator

Conrad Khunrath (1555, Leipzig – 1613, probably in Hamburg) was a German merchant, alchemist, mint worker, doctor, author, editor, and translator. He is particularly important as the author of Medulla destillatoria, a work of Paracelsian iatrochemistry which was published in many editions for well over a century.

== Life ==
Conrad Khunrath was born around 1555 to the Leipzig merchant Sebastian Kunrat and his wife Anna. He had at least ten younger siblings, among them Heinrich Khunrath, who became known as an alchemist in his own right. By 1562, Conrad, still a child, had enrolled at Leipzig University, though this seems to have been only pro forma. In his youth, Conrad traveled around England where he learned the English language. He is known to have worked as a merchant from 1580; after the death of his father, Conrad also took over the cloth and vitriol trade. Subsequently, Khunrath expanded his professional activities into medical practice. His medications relied on spagyric or alchemical processes he developed himself.

By 1594, Khurath resided in Schleswig. There he published the first edition of his magnum opus Medulla destillatoria, as well as a number of ancillary works and later editions. From about 1606 Khunrath worked as coin controller for the mint in Hamburg, managing the upheavals of the Kipper und Wipper financial crisis. He died, probably in Hamburg, shortly before 6 May 1613.

Two years after his death, another part of the Medulla destillatoria was published.

== Selected works ==
As author

- Medulla destillatoria et medica. Schleswig, 1594.
- (Volume 1, 1621; Volume 1, 1623; Volume 1, 1638; Volume 2, 1638.)
- Fünf schöne medicische Tractat. Schleswig, 1596.
- Vier schöne medicische Tractat. Schleswig, 1597.
- Mystica et chymica quaedam arcana. Hamburg, 1600
- Edelstes Kleinod Menschlicher Gesundheit; das ist: Die auß den Geheimnissen der Natur hervorgesuchte/ unschätzbare und höchstbewährte Destillier- und Artzeney-Kunst : Zu besserer Bedienung/ sind … jedem Theile drey nützliche und vollständige Register angefüget/... Frankfurt, Leipzig, Halberstadt: Hynitzsch, 1680. (Volume 1, 1860; Volume 2, 1860.)

As editor or translator

- Paracelsus, Chirurgia vulnerum. Schleswig, 1595.
- Eine Proclamation, Der newen Müntze halben. Hamburg, 1605.
- Zween schöne Tractat. Hamburg, 1606.
- Relatio Oder Erzehlung, Wie der Grossmechtigste Herr Christianus Quartus.... Hamburg, 1607.
