= Heinrich Khunrath =

German scientist (c.1560–1605)

Heinrich Khunrath Medicinae Doctoris
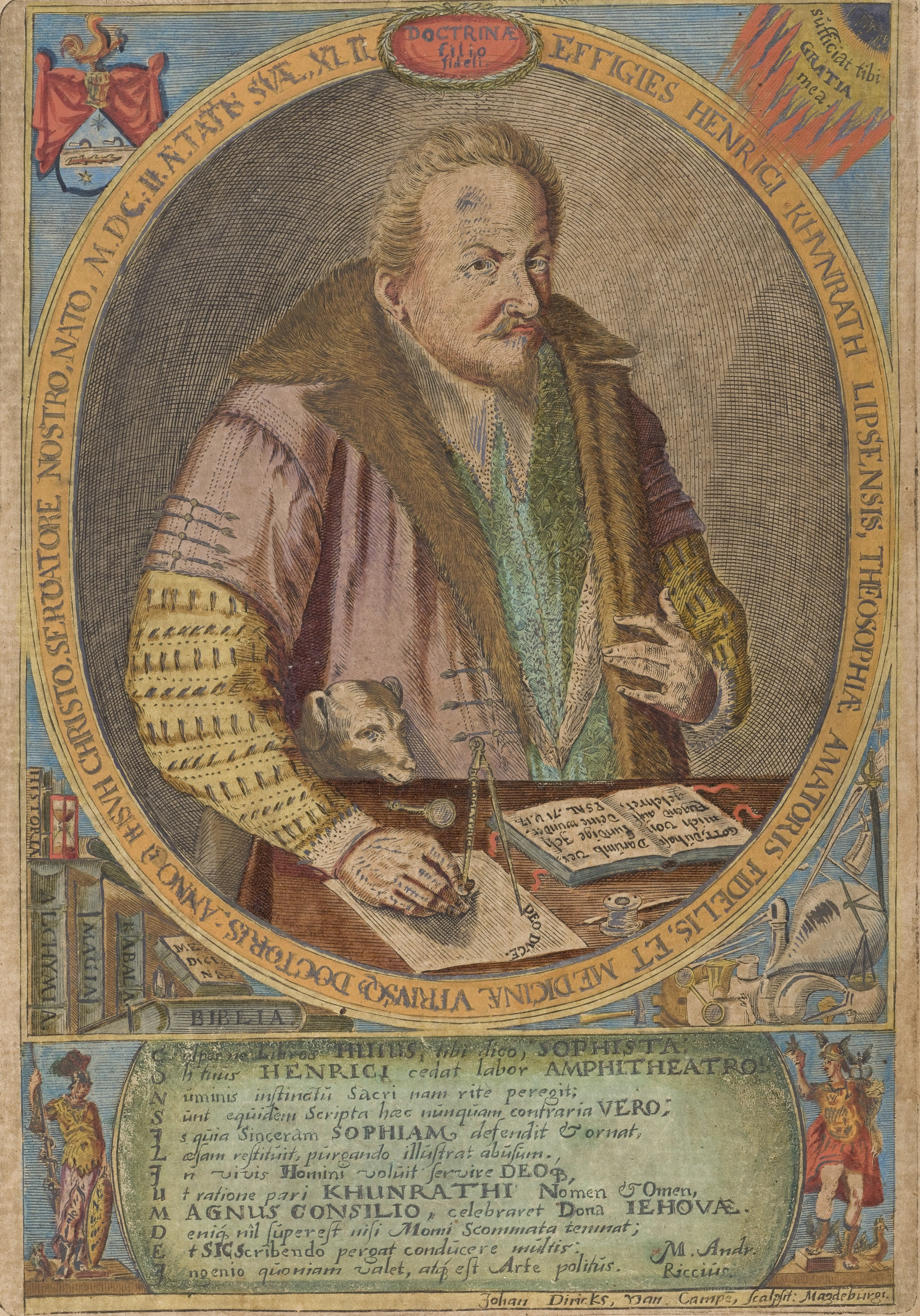
- Born: 1560; Dresden, Electorate of Saxony
- Died: 9 September 1605 (aged 44–45)
- Other names: Henrico; Henrici
- Occupation: Physician
- Known for: Hermetic philosophy, alchemy
- Notable work: Amphitheatrum sapientiae aeternae

Heinrich Khunrath (c. 1560 – 9 September 1605), or Dr. Henricus Khunrath as he was also called, was a German physician, hermetic philosopher, and alchemist. Frances Yates considered him to be a link between the philosophy of John Dee and Rosicrucianism. His name, in the spelling "Henricus Künraht" was used as a pseudonym for the 1670 publisher of the Tractatus Theologico-Politicus of Baruch Spinoza.

== Life and education ==
Khunrath was born in Dresden, Saxony, the son of the merchant Sebastian Kunrat and his wife Anna in the year 1560. He was the younger brother of the Leipzig physician Conrad Khunrath. In the winter of 1570, he may have enrolled at the University of Leipzig under the name of Henricus Conrad Lips. The uncertainties surrounding his life stem from his supposed use of multiple names. It is certain that in May 1588, he matriculated at the University of Basel, Switzerland, earning his Medicinæ Doctor degree on 3 September 1588, after a defense of twenty-eight doctoral theses.

== Career ==
Khunrath, a disciple of Paracelsus, practiced medicine in Dresden, Magdeburg, and Hamburg and may have held a professorial position in Leipzig. He travelled widely after 1588, including a stay at the Imperial court in Prague, home to the mystically-inclined Rudolf II, Holy Roman Emperor. Before reaching Prague he had met John Dee at Bremen on 27 May 1589, when Dee was on his way back to England from Bohemia. Khunrath praised Dee in his later works. During his court stay Khunrath met the alchemist Edward Kelley who had remained behind after he and Dee had parted company (Kelley was arrested on 30 April 1591 as an alleged imposter). In September 1591, Khunrath was appointed court physician to Count Rosemberk in Trebona. He probably met Johann Thölde while at Trebona, one of the suggested authors of the "Basilius Valentinus" treatises on alchemy.

== Hermetic alchemist ==
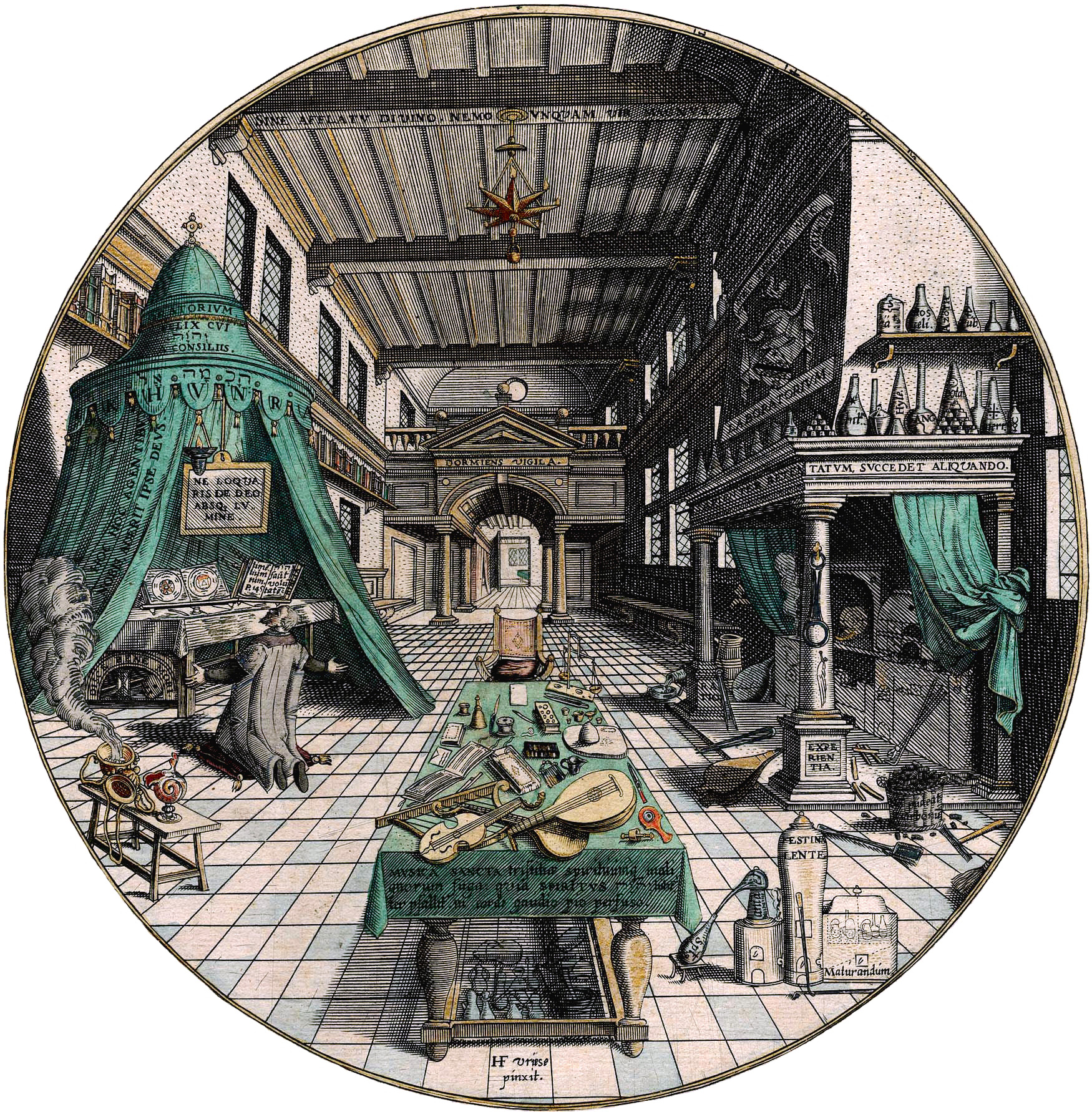
"The First Stage of the Great Work," better-known as the "Alchemist's Laboratory." The drawing of the laboratory is credited to architectural painter Hans Vredeman de Vries (1527–1604) and shows Khunrath in his laboratory.

Khunrath's brushes with John Dee and Thölde and Paracelsian beliefs led him to develop a Christianized natural magic, seeking to find the secret prima materia that would lead man into eternal wisdom. The Christianized view that Khunrath took was framed around his commitment to Lutheran theology. He also held that experience and observation were essential to practical alchemical research, as would a natural philosopher.

His most famous work on alchemy is the Amphitheatrum Sapientiae Aeternae (Amphitheater of Eternal Wisdom), a work on the mystical aspects of that art, which contains the oft-seen engraving entitled "The First Stage of the Great Work", better-known as the "Alchemist's Laboratory". The book was first published at Hamburg in 1595, with four circular elaborate, hand-colored, engraved plates heightened with gold and silver which Khunrath designed and were engraved by Paullus van der Doort. The book was then made more widely available in an expanded edition with the addition of other plates published posthumously in Hanau in 1609. Amphitheatrum Sapientiae Aeternae is an alchemical classic, combining both Christianity and magic. In it, Khunrath showed himself to be an adept of spiritual alchemy and illustrated the many-staged and intricate path to spiritual perfection. Khunrath's work was important in Lutheran circles. John Warwick Montgomery has pointed out that Johann Arndt (1555–1621), who was the influential writer of Lutheran books of pietiesm and devotion, composed a commentary on Amphitheatrum. Some of the ideas in his works are Kabbalistic in nature and foreshadow Rosicrucianism.

== Death ==
Khunrath may have encountered some opposition to his alchemical work because most of his publications on alchemy were published widely after his death. He died in either Dresden or Leipzig on 9 September 1605. The tension between spirituality and experiment in Amphitheatrum Sapientiae Aeternae brought about its condemnation by the Sorbonne in 1625.

== Gallery ==
The following are colored illustrations from a copy of the Amphitheatrum sapientiae aeternae at the University of Wisconsin–Madison Libraries:

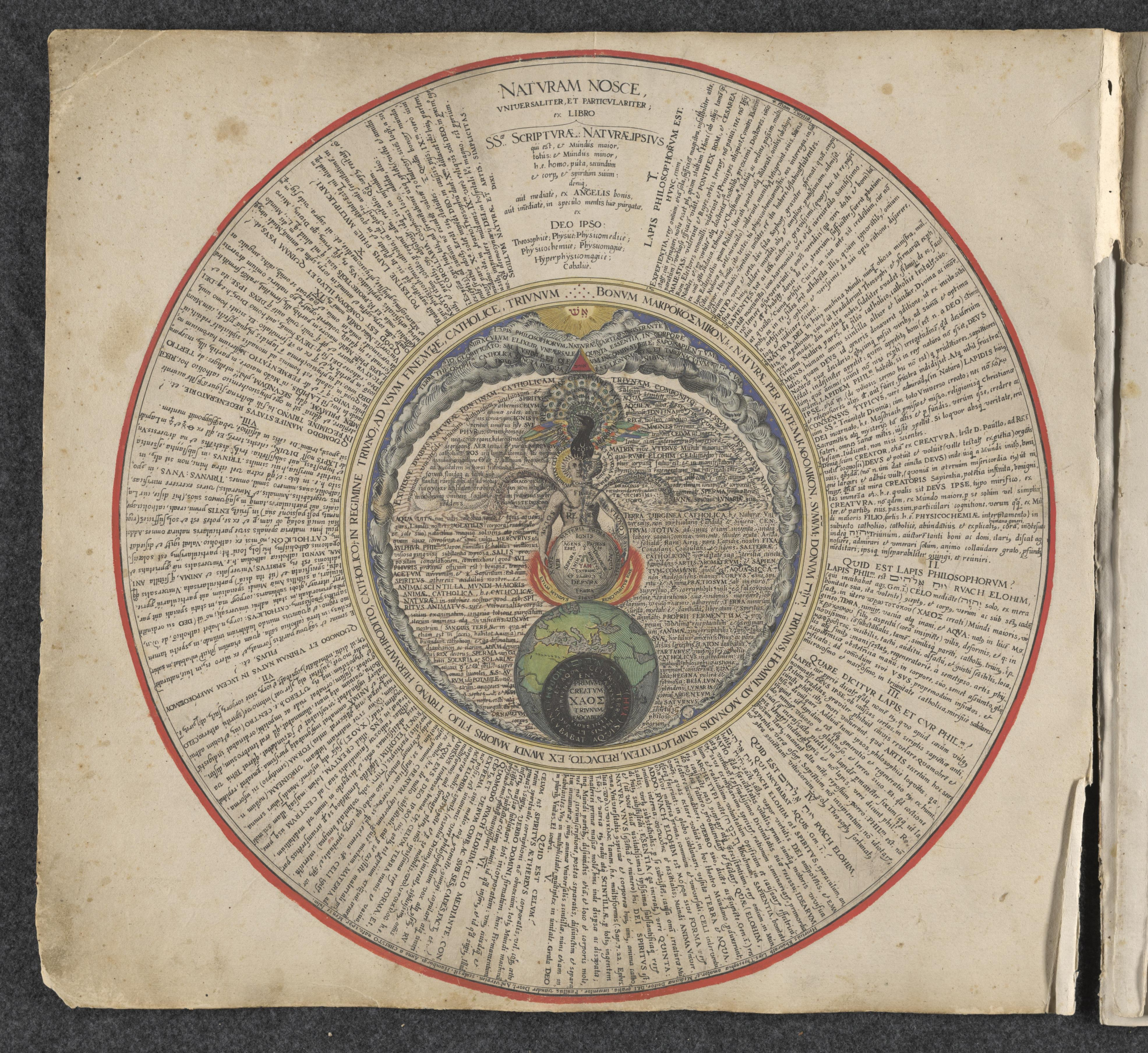

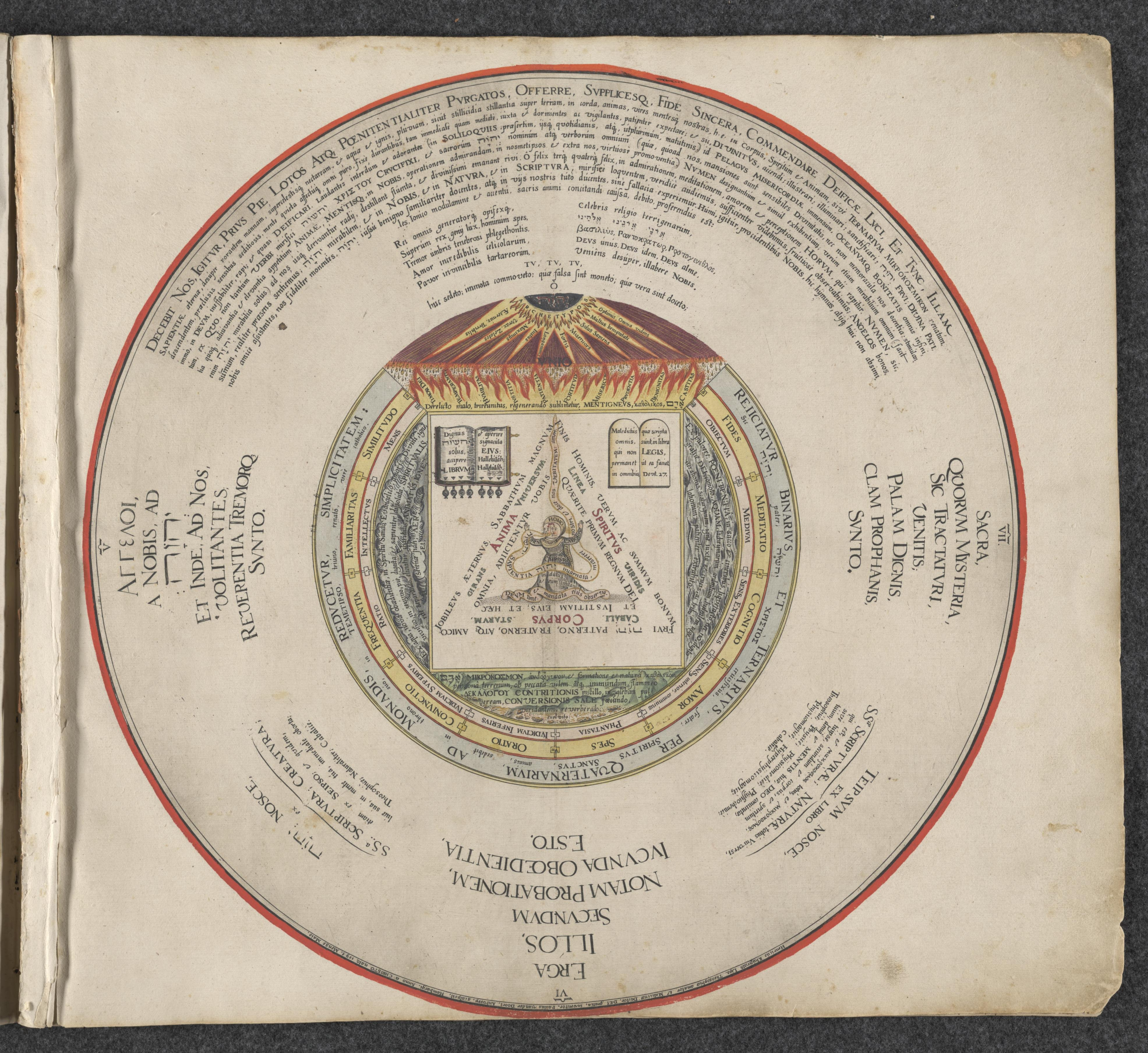

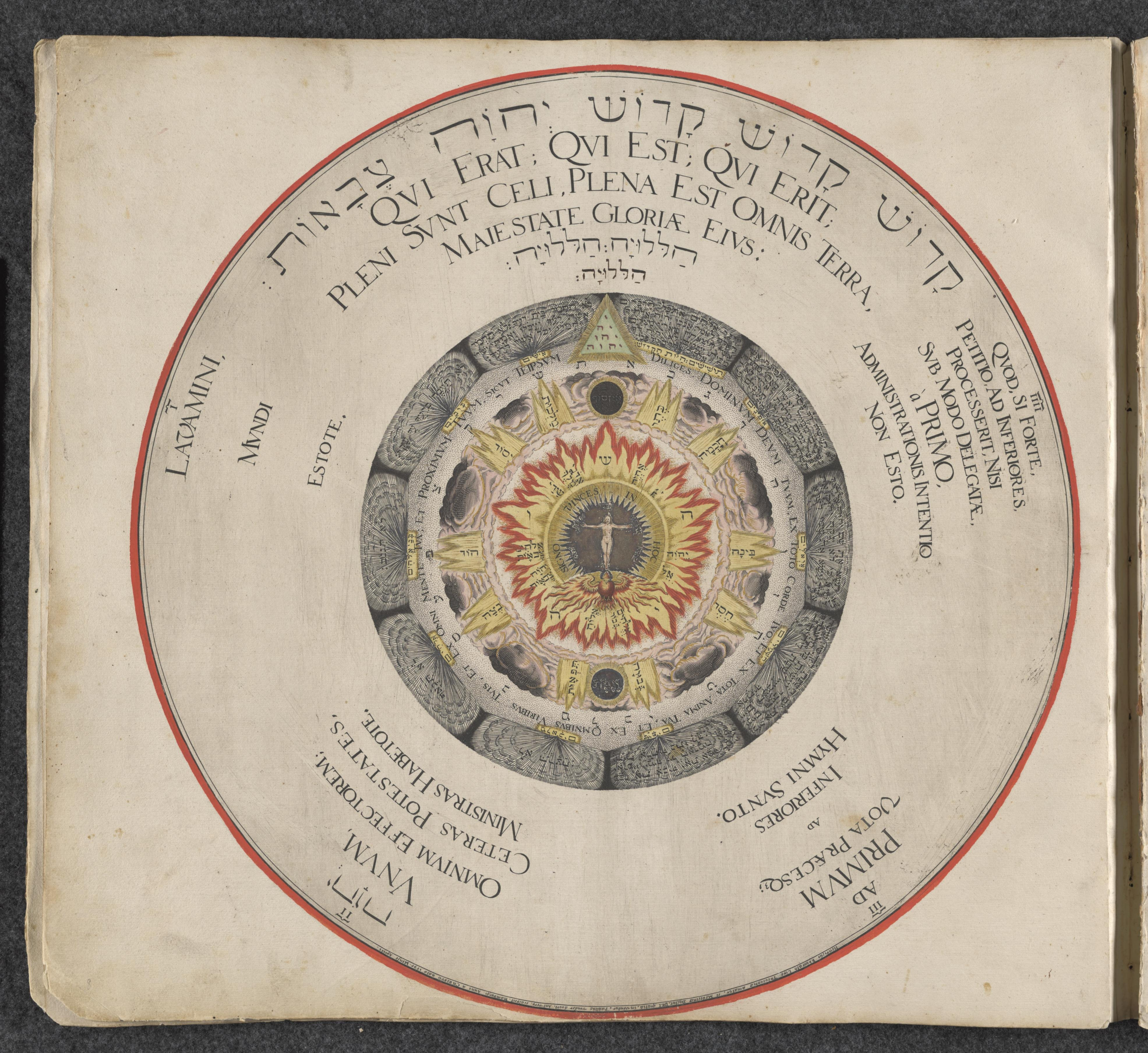

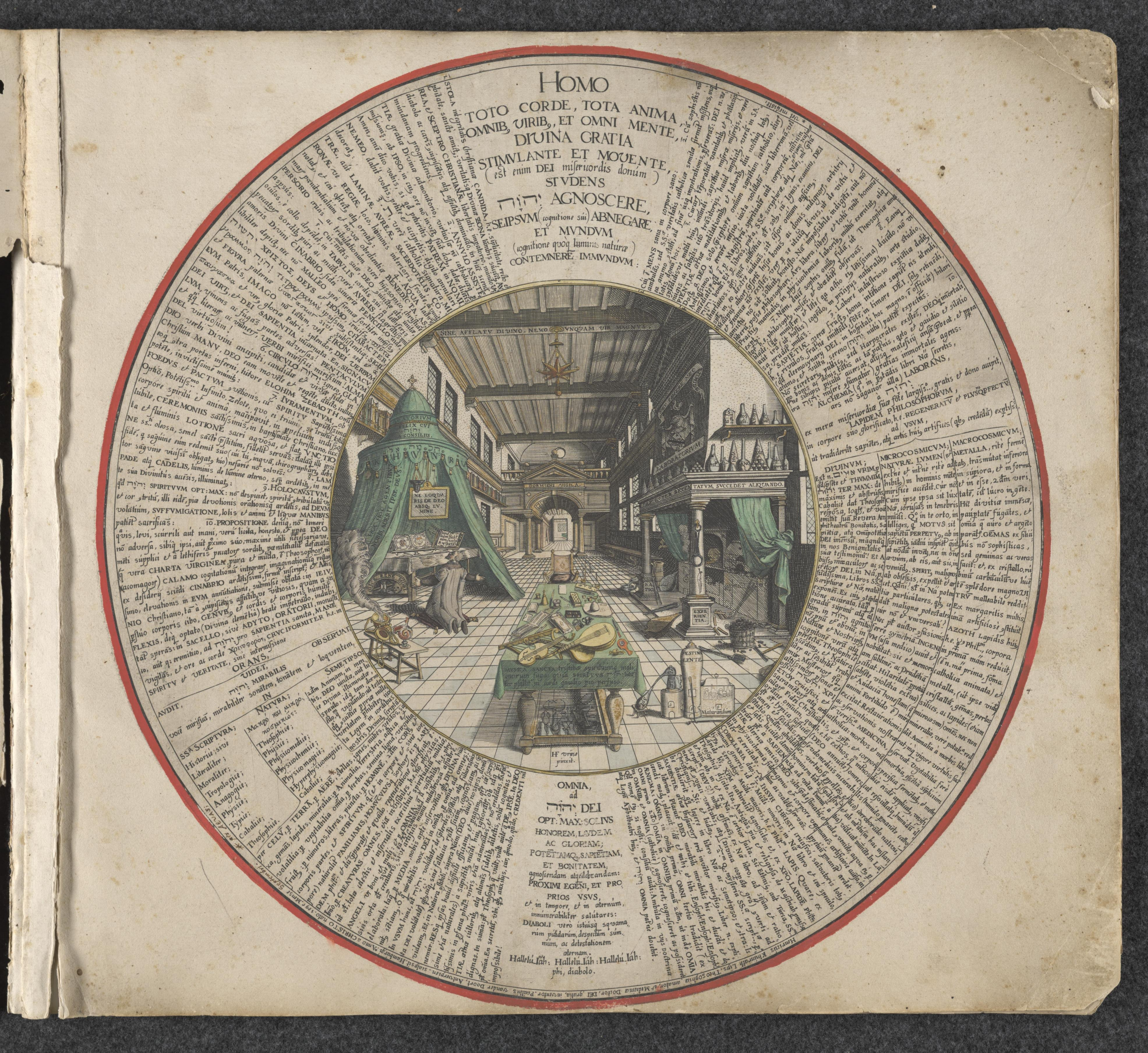

== Writings ==
- De signatura rerum naturalium theses. Basel. 1588.
- Amphitheatrum sapientiae aeternae. Hamburg. 1595.

Carlos Gilly; Anja Hallacker; Hanns-Peter Neumann, eds. (2013). Amphitheatrum sapientiae aeternae – Schauplatz der ewig allein wahren Weisheit (in Latin and German) (Clavis Pansophiae 6 ed.). Stuttgart - Bad Cannstatt: frommann-holzboog. p. 500. ISBN 978-3-7728-1628-4. Archived from the original on 16 October 2014. - Reprint of the first (Hamburg 1595) and second (last) edition (Hanau 1609), together with a transcription of a German translation (18th century).

- Confessio de chao physico-chemicorum catholico : in quo catholice habitat azoth sive materia prima mundi, h.e. mercurius sapientum : ubi magnesiae (subjecti videlicet lapidis philosophorum catholici) conditiones fideliter recensentur. 1595.
- Von hylealischen das ist, pri-materialischen catholischen, oder algemeinemx natürlichen … chaos der naturgemässen alchymiae und alchymisten, wiederholete, verneuerte und wolvermehrete naturgemäss-alchymisch- und recht-lehrende philosophische Confessio oder Bekandtniss … Deme beygefügt ist eine treuhertzige Wahrnungs-Vermahnung an alle wahre Alchymisten, sich vor den betrügerischen Arg-Chymisten zu hüten. Magdeburg. 1597.
- Naturgemes-alchymisch symbolum, oder, gahr kurtze Bekentnus …: von allgemeinem, natürlichen, dreyeinigen, wunderbaren, und wunderthätigen, allergeheimbsten Chao der naturgemessen Alchymisten: desz philosophischen universal und grossen Steins rechten natürlichen unnd eigenen Subjecto, oder, waren und einiger Materia. Hamburg. 1598.
- Magnesia catholica philosophorum, das ist, höheste Nothwendigkeit in Alchymia, auch mügliche uberkommung augenscheinliche Weisung, vnd genugsame Erweisung catholischer verborgener Magnesiae; des geheimen wunderthetigen vniversal Steins naturgemess-chymischer philosophorum Rechten vnd allein wahren pri-materialischen Svbiecti. Magdeburg. 1599.
- Wahrhafter Bericht vom philosophischen Athanor und dessen Gebrauch und Nutzen …. Magdeburg. 1603.
- Quaestiones tres, per-utiles …: cum curationem, tum praecautionem absolutam … Arenae, Sabuli, Calculi, Podagrae, Gonagrae, Chiragrae, aliorumque morborum tartareorum microcosmi … hominis puta, concernentes: das ist, hochnützliche … drei Fragen, die gründliche, vollkommene und warhafftige Curation oder Genesung, so wol auch Precaution, oder Verhutung Sandes, Grieses Steins, Zipperleins und anderer mehr tartarischer Kranckheiten microcosmi … oder des Menschen betreffende. Leipzig. 1607.
- De igne magorum philosophorumque secreto externo & visibili; das ist, Philosophische Erklahrung, von, und uber dem … Gludt und Flammenfewer der uhralten Magorum oder Weysen … Beneben andern zweyen Tractätlein: deren das erste in … Judicium … eines erfahrnen Cabalisten und Philosophen uber die 4. Figuren desz grossen Amphitheatri. Strassburg. 1608.
- Lux in tenebris; das ist … Liecht vnd Wegnuss vnd Irrthumb vmbgeben …. 1614.
- Medulla Distillatoria & Medica. Hamburg. 1638.
