= Philosopher's stone =

Legendary alchemical substance

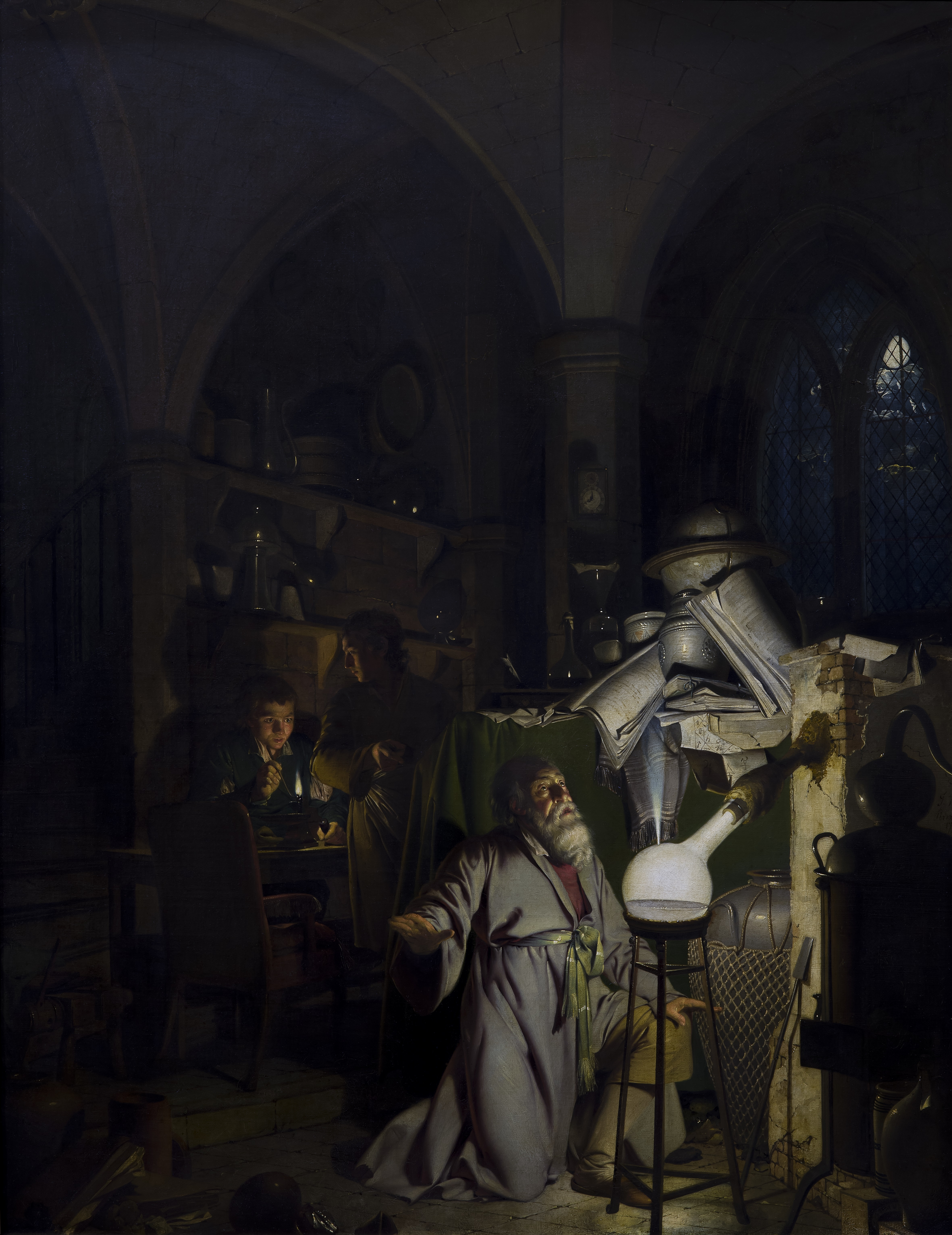
The Alchemist Discovering Phosphorus, by Joseph Wright of Derby (1771)

The philosopher's stone (Note: Also spelled "philosophers' stone". (Arabic: حجر الفلاسفة, romanized: ḥajar al-falāsifa; Latin: lapis philosophorum)) is a mythic alchemical substance capable of turning base metals such as lead and mercury into gold or silver; (Note: The alchemical terms are chrysopoeia from Ancient Greek χρυσοποιία (khrusopoiía) meaning 'gold-making', and argyropoeia (ἀργυροποιία, arguropoiía) for 'silver-making'.) it was also known as "the tincture" and "the powder" as well as "red lion" for gold and "white lion" for silver. Alchemists additionally believed that it could be used to make an elixir of life which made possible rejuvenation and immortality.

For many centuries, it was the most sought-after goal in alchemy. The philosopher's stone was the central symbol of the mystical terminology of alchemy, symbolizing perfection at its finest, divine illumination, and heavenly bliss. Efforts to discover the philosopher's stone were known as the Magnum Opus ("Great Work").

== Antiquity ==
The earliest known written mention of the philosopher's stone is in the Cheirokmeta by Zosimos of Panopolis (c. 300 AD). Alchemical writers assign a longer history. Elias Ashmole and the anonymous author of Gloria Mundi (1620) claim that its history goes back to Adam, who acquired the knowledge of the stone directly from God. This knowledge was said to have been passed down through biblical patriarchs, giving them their longevity.

The theoretical roots outlining the stone's creation can be traced to Greek philosophy. Alchemists later used the classical elements, the concept of anima mundi, and creation stories presented in texts like Plato's Timaeus as analogies for their process. According to Plato, the four elements are derived from a common source or prima materia (first matter), associated with chaos. Prima materia is also the name alchemists assign to the starting ingredient for the creation of the philosopher's stone. The importance of this philosophical first matter persisted throughout the history of alchemy. In the seventeenth century, Thomas Vaughan writes, "the first matter of the stone is the very same with the first matter of all things."

== Middle Ages ==
In the Byzantine Empire and the Arab empires, early medieval alchemists built upon the work of Zosimos. Byzantine and Islamic alchemists were fascinated by the concept of metal transmutation and attempted to carry out the process. The eighth-century Muslim alchemist Jabir ibn Hayyan—Jabir was often romanised as Geber—analysed each classical element in terms of the four basic qualities. Fire was both hot and dry, earth cold and dry, water cold and moist, and air hot and moist. He theorized that every metal was a combination of these four principles, two of them interior and two exterior. From this premise, it was reasoned that the transmutation of one metal into another could be effected by the rearrangement of its basic qualities. This change would be mediated by a substance, which came to be called xerion in Greek and al-iksir in Arabic (from which the word elixir is derived). It was often considered to exist as a dry red powder—also known as al-kibrit al-ahmar ('red sulfur')—made from a legendary stone: the philosopher's stone. The elixir powder came to be regarded as a crucial component of transmutation by later Arab alchemists.

In the 11th century, there was a debate among Islamic chemists on whether the transmutation of substances was possible. A leading opponent was the Persian polymath Avicenna (a.k.a. Ibn Sina), who discredited the theory of the transmutation of substances, stating, "Those of the chemical craft know well that no change can be effected in the different species of substances, though they can produce the appearance of such change."

According to legend, the 13th-century scientist and philosopher Albertus Magnus is said to have discovered the philosopher's stone. Magnus did not confirm he discovered the stone in his writings, but he did record that he witnessed the creation of gold by "transmutation".

== Renaissance to early modern period ==
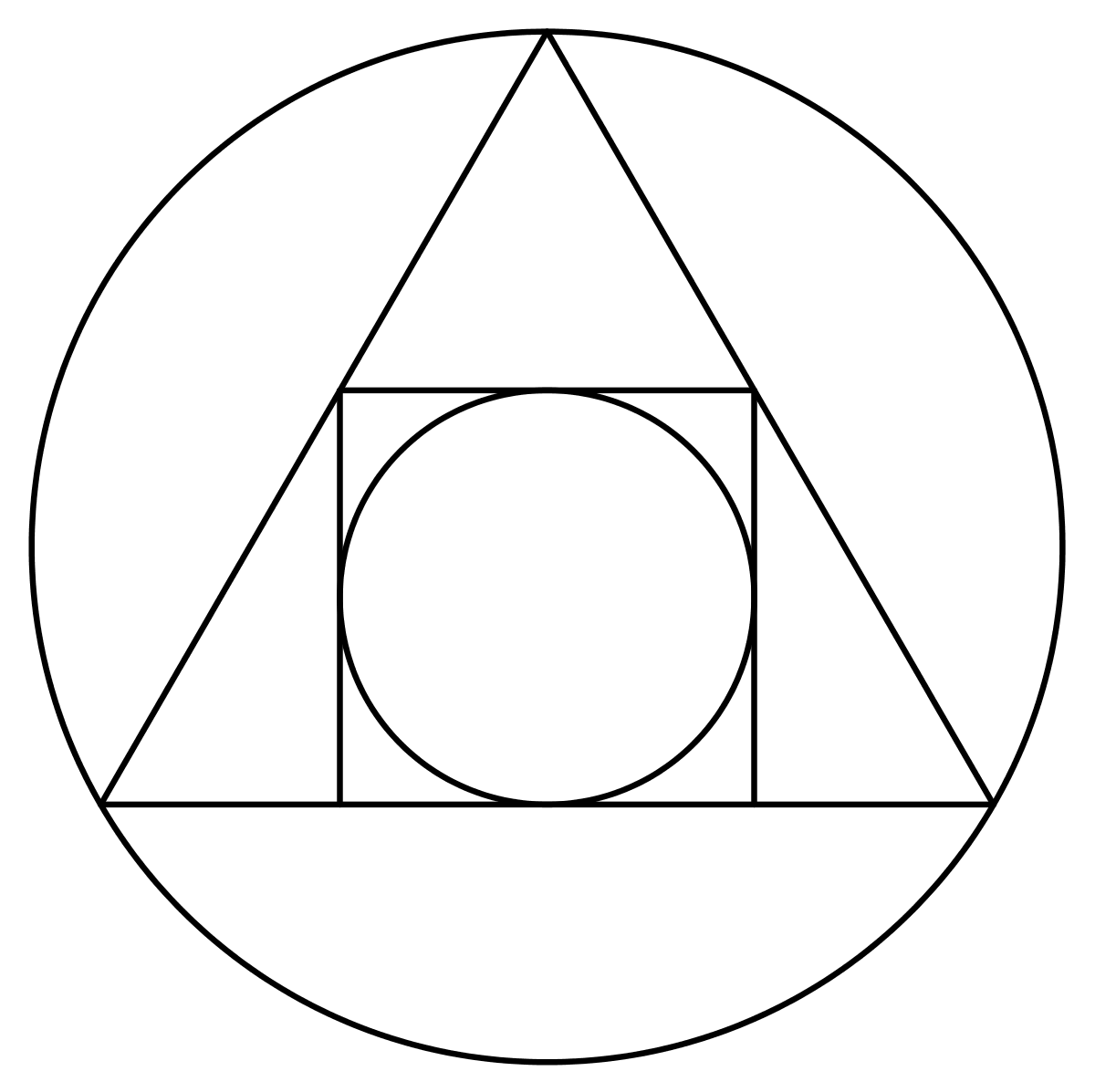
The Squared Circle: a 17th century alchemical symbol illustrating the interplay of the four elements of matter that symbolize the philosopher's stone.

The 16th-century Swiss alchemist Paracelsus (Philippus Aureolus Theophrastus Bombastus von Hohenheim) believed in the existence of alkahest, which he thought to be an undiscovered element from which all other elements (earth, fire, water, air) were simply derivative forms. Paracelsus believed that this element was, in fact, the philosopher's stone.

The English philosopher Sir Thomas Browne in his spiritual testament Religio Medici (1643) identified the religious aspect of the quest for the philosopher's Stone when declaring:

The smattering I have of the Philosophers stone, (which is something more than the perfect exaltation of gold) hath taught me a great deale of Divinity.

— (R.M.Part 1:38)

A mystical text published in the 17th century, the Mutus Liber, appears to be a symbolic instruction manual for concocting a philosopher's stone. Called the "wordless book", it was a collection of 15 illustrations.

== In Buddhism and Hinduism ==
The equivalent of the philosopher's stone in Buddhism and Hinduism is the Cintamani (also spelled Chintamani.) It is also referred to as Parasamani (Sanskrit: पारसमणि), Paras (Hindi: पारस), and Paris (Marathi: परिस) in Sanskrit, Hindi, and Marathi, respectively.

In Mahayana Buddhism, Chintamani is held by the bodhisattvas Avalokiteshvara and Ksitigarbha. It is also seen carried upon the back of the Lung ta (wind horse) depicted on Tibetan prayer flags. By reciting the dharani of Chintamani, Buddhist tradition maintains that one attains wisdom, is able to understand the truth of the Buddhas, and turns one's afflictions into bodhi (enlightenment in Buddhism). It is said to allow one to see the Amitabha Buddha and his retinue upon one's deathbed. In Tibetan Buddhist tradition, the Chintamani is sometimes depicted as a luminous pearl and is in the possession of several different forms of the Buddha.

In Hinduism, the philosopher's stone is connected to the gods Vishnu and Ganesha. It is often depicted as a jewel in the possession of the Nāga king or a jewel adorning the forehead of the Makara. The Yoga Vasistha, originally written in the tenth century AD, contains a story about the philosopher's stone.

A great Hindu sage wrote about the spiritual accomplishment of gnosis using the metaphor of the philosopher's stone. Sant Dnyaneshwar (1275–1296) wrote a commentary with 17 references to the philosopher's stone that explicitly transmuted base metal into gold. The seventh-century Siddhar Tirumular, in his classic Tirumandhiram, explains humankind's path to immortality and divinity. In verse 2709, he declares that the name of God, Shiva, is an alchemical vehicle that turns the body into immortal gold.

Another depiction of the philosopher's stone is the Shyāmantaka Mani (श्यामन्तक मणि). According to Hindu mythology, the Shyāmantaka Mani is a ruby, capable of preventing all natural calamities such as droughts, floods, etc. around its owner, as well as producing eight bhāras (≈1700 pounds or 700 kilograms) of gold, every day.

== Properties ==
The most commonly mentioned properties are the ability to transmute base metals into gold or silver, the ability to heal all forms of illness and prolong the life of any person who consumes a small part of the philosopher's stone diluted in wine. Other mentioned properties include: creation of perpetually burning lamps, transmutation of common crystals into precious stones and diamonds, reviving of dead plants, creation of flexible or malleable glass, and the creation of a clone or homunculus.

=== Names ===
Numerous synonyms were used to make oblique reference to the stone, such as "white stone" (calculus albus, identified with the calculus candidus of Revelation 2:17, which was taken as a symbol of the glory of heaven), vitriol (as expressed in the backronym Visita Interiora Terrae Rectificando Invenies Occultum Lapidem), also lapis noster, lapis occultus, in water at the box, and numerous oblique, mystical or mythological references such as Adam, Aer, Animal, Alkahest, Antidotus, Antimonium, Aqua benedicta, Aqua volans per aeram, Arcanum, Atramentum, Autumnus, Basilicus, Brutorum cor, Bufo, Capillus, Capistrum auri, Carbones, Cerberus, Chaos, Cinis cineris, Crocus, Dominus philosophorum, Divine quintessence, Draco elixir, Filius ignis, Fimus, Folium, Frater, Granum, Granum frumenti, Haematites, Hepar, Herba, Herbalis, Kimia, Lac, Melancholia, Ovum philosophorum, Panacea salutifera, Pandora, Phoenix, Philosophic mercury, Pyrites, Radices arboris solares, Regina, Rex regum, Sal metallorum, Salvator terrenus, Talcum, Thesaurus, Ventus hermetis. Many of the medieval allegories of Christ were adopted for the lapis, and the Christ and the Stone were indeed taken as identical in a mystical sense. The name of "Stone" or lapis itself is informed by early Christian allegory, such as Priscillian (4th century), who stated,

Unicornis est Deus, nobis petra Christus, nobis lapis angularis Jesus, nobis hominum homo Christus (One-horned is God, Christ the rock to us, Jesus the cornerstone to us, Christ the man of men to us.)

In some texts, it is simply called "stone", or our stone, or in the case of Thomas Norton's Ordinal, "oure delycious stone". The stone was frequently praised and referred to in such terms.

The Latin expression lapis philosophorum, as well as the Arabic ḥajar al-falāsifa from which the Latin derives, both employ the plural form of the word for philosopher. Thus, a literal translation would be philosophers' stone, rather than philosopher's stone.

=== Appearance ===
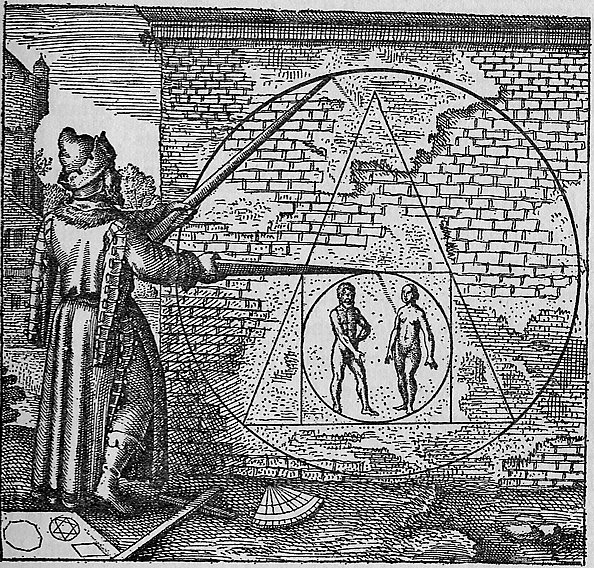
Philosopher's stone as pictured in Atalanta Fugiens, Emblem XXI

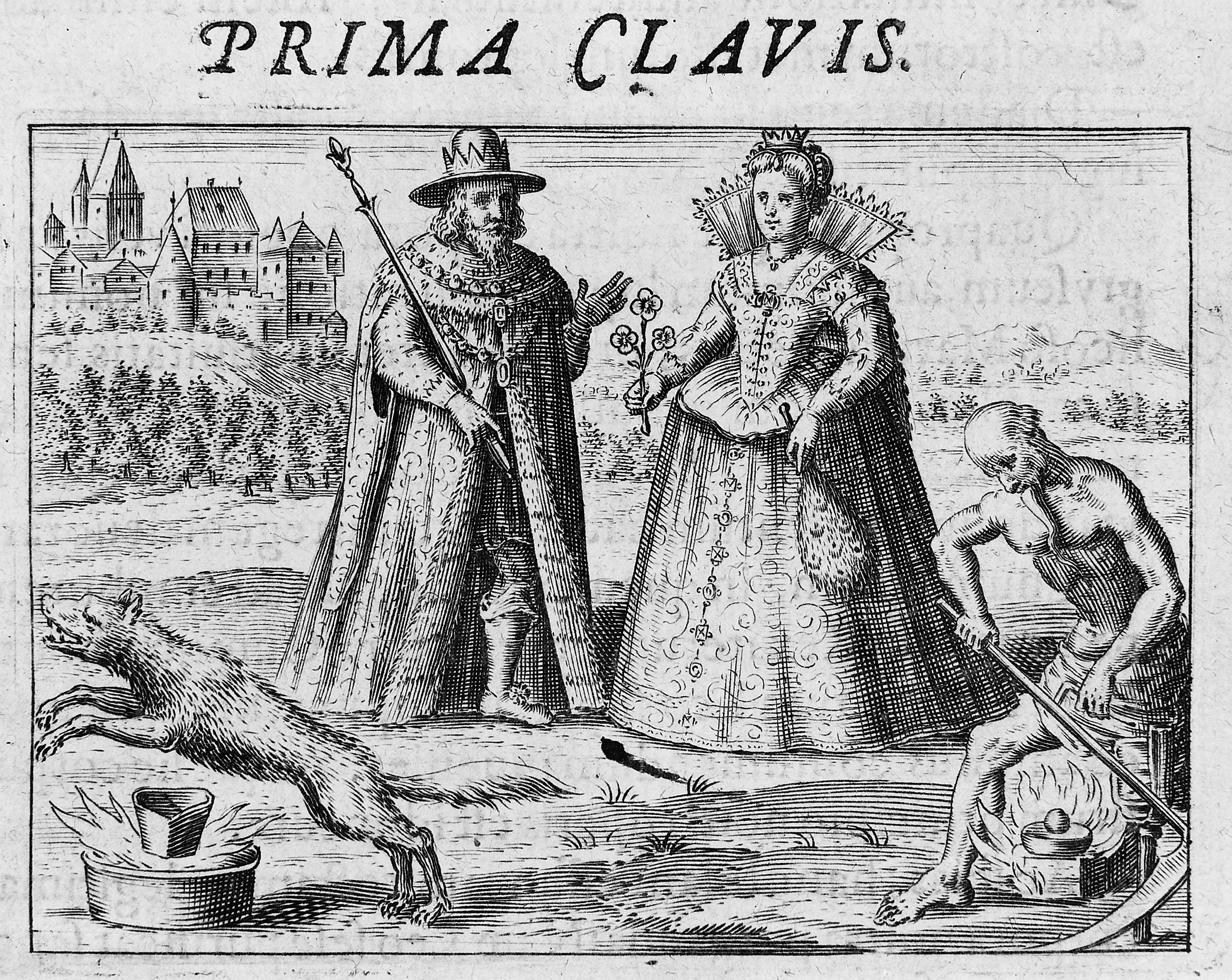
This is an illustration of the "First Key of Basil Valentine", an emblem associated with the "Great Work" in obtaining the Philosopher's stone (see also, The Twelve Keys of Basil Valentine).

Descriptions of the philosopher's stone are numerous and various. According to alchemical texts, the stone of the philosophers came in two varieties, prepared by an almost identical method: white (for the purpose of making silver), and red (for the purpose of making gold), the white stone being a less matured version of the red stone. Some ancient and medieval alchemical texts leave clues to the physical appearance of the stone of the philosophers, specifically the red stone. It is often said to be orange (saffron-coloured) or red when ground into a powder. Or in a solid form, an intermediate between red and purple, transparent and glass-like. The weight is spoken of as being heavier than gold, and it is soluble in any liquid, and incombustible in fire.

Alchemical authors sometimes suggest that the stone's descriptors are metaphorical. The appearance is expressed geometrically in Atalanta Fugiens Emblem XXI:

Make of a man and woman a circle; then a quadrangle; out of this a triangle; make again a circle, and you will have the Stone of the Wise. Thus is made the stone, which thou canst not discover, unless you, through diligence, learn to understand this geometrical teaching.

He further describes in greater detail the metaphysical nature of the meaning of the emblem as a divine union of feminine and masculine principles:

In like manner the Philosophers would have the quadrangle reduced into a triangle, that is, into body, Spirit, and Soul, which three do appear in three previous colors before redness, for example, the body or earth in the blackness of Saturn, the Spirit in a lunar whiteness, as water, the Soul or air in a solar citrinity: then will the triangle be perfect, but this likewise must be changed into a circle, that is, into an invariable redness: By which operation the woman is converted into the man, and made one with him, and the senary the first number of the perfect completed by one, two, having returned again to an [sic] unit, in which is eternal rest and peace.

Rupescissa uses the imagery of the Christian passion, saying that it ascends "from the sepulcher of the Most Excellent King, shining and glorious, resuscitated from the dead and wearing a red diadem...".

== Interpretations ==
The various names and attributes assigned to the philosopher's stone have led to long-standing speculation on its composition and source. Exoteric candidates have been found in metals, plants, rocks, chemical compounds, and bodily products such as hair, urine, and eggs. Justus von Liebig states that 'it was indispensable that every substance accessible... should be observed and examined'. Alchemists once thought a key component in the creation of the stone was a mythical element named carmot.

Esoteric hermetic alchemists may reject work on exoteric substances, instead directing their search for the philosopher's stone inward. Though esoteric and exoteric approaches are sometimes mixed, it is clear that some authors "are not concerned with material substances but are employing the language of exoteric alchemy for the sole purpose of expressing theological, philosophical, or mystical beliefs and aspirations". New interpretations continue to be developed around spagyric, chemical, and esoteric schools of thought.

The transmutation mediated by the stone has also been interpreted as a psychological process. Idries Shah devotes a chapter of his book, The Sufis, to provide a detailed analysis of the symbolic significance of alchemical work with the philosopher's stone. His analysis is based in part on a linguistic interpretation through Arabic equivalents of one of the terms for the stone (Azoth) as well as for sulfur, salt, and mercury.

== Creation ==
The philosopher's stone is created by the alchemical method known as The Magnum Opus or The Great Work. Often expressed as a series of color changes or chemical processes, the instructions for creating the philosopher's stone are varied. When expressed in colours, the work may pass through phases of nigredo (black), albedo (white), citrinitas (yellow), and rubedo (red). When expressed as a series of chemical processes it often includes seven or twelve stages concluding in multiplication and projection.

== Art and entertainment ==
The philosopher's stone has been an inspiration, plot feature, or subject of innumerable artistic works: animations, comics, films, musical compositions, novels, and video games. Examples include Harry Potter and the Philosopher's Stone, As Above, So Below, Fullmetal Alchemist, The Flash and The Mystery of Mamo.

The philosopher's stone is an important motif in Gothic fiction, and originated in William Godwin's 1799 novel St. Leon.

== See also ==
- Angelicall Stone
- Biological transmutation
- Cintamani
- Cupellation
- Filius philosophorum
- Indra's net
- Kagome metal
- Midas
- Nicolas Flamel
- Nuclear transmutation
- Panacea (medicine)
- Synthesis of precious metals
- The Net (substance)
- Unobtainium
- Aqua regia
