= Angelicall Stone =

Concept in alchemy

The Angelicall Stone is a concept in alchemy. According to Elias Ashmole the stone was the goal above all goals for the alchemist. In his prologue to the Theatrum Chemicum Britannicum, he states:

Lastly, as touching the Angellicall stone, it is so subtill, saith the aforesaid author, that it can be neither seene, felt, or weighed, but tasted only. The voyce of man (which bears some proportion to these subtill properties) comes short in comparison; nay the air itself is not so penetrable, and yet (Oh mysterious wonder !) a stone, that will lodge in the fire to eternity without being prejudiced. It hath a divine power, celestiall, invisible, above the rest; and endows the possessor with Divine gifts. It affords the apparition of angells, and gives a power of conversing with them, by dreams and revelations:nor dare any evil spirit approach the place where it lodgeth. Because it is a quintessence wherein there is no corruptable thing; and where the elements are not corrupted, no devil can stay or abide.

S. Dunston calls it the Food of Angels, and by others it is termed The Heavenly Viaticum; the Tree of Life, and (next under GOD) the true Alchochodon, or Giver of Years; for by it man's body is preserved from corruption, being thereby enabled to live a long time without foode: nay 'tis made a question as to whether any man can dye who uses it. Which I doe not so much admire, as to think why the possessors of it should desire to live, that have those manifestations of glory and eternity, presented unto there fleshly eyes; but rather desire to be dissolved, and to enjoy the full fruition, then live where they must be content with the bare speculation.

After Hermes Trismegistus had once obtained knowledge of this stone, he gave over the use of all other stones; and therein only delighted; Moses and Solomon (together with Hermes) were the only three that excelled in the knowledge thereof, and who therewith wrought wonders.

== See also ==
- Philosopher's Stone
- Alchemy
- Aether
- Ambrosia
