= Mutus Liber =

Hermetic philosophical work (book)

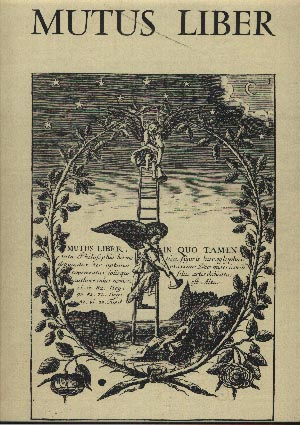
Mutus Liber cover

The Mutus Liber, or Mute Book (from Latin: Silent Book), is a Hermetic philosophical work published in La Rochelle in 1677. It ranks amongst the major books on alchemy in Early Modern literature, just as much as does Atalanta Fugiens by Michael Maier. It has been reprinted numerous times.

Consisting mainly of illustrated plates, Mutus Liber arouses contradictory interpretations. Its meaning was pored over for a long time by authors such as Eugène Canseliet and Serge Hutin, who claimed to be initiated alchemists. More recent studies are striving to use its historical reality in order to reveal its meaning.

== Editions ==
The first edition of Mutus Liber dates from 1677, published by Pierre Savouret in La Rochelle. No more than a few dozen copies have been printed. Twelve original copies are conserved in main Western libraries. There may be more copies, however. As early as 1702 it was reprinted in Geneva, with new plates, and edited by Jean-Antoine Chouet and Jean-Jacques Manget. Eugène Canseliet purports seeing some pages of a Parisian edition dating from 1725. But the existence of this edition has not been established. A third version of Mutus Liber was entirely reprinted around 1760 in Paris, and this third edition is extremely rare. Mutus Liber was temporarily forgotten, but then regained editorial interest in the second half of the 19th century. Since the beginning of the 20th century, editions have multiplied, sometimes accompanied by prefaces detailing more or less precisely its contents. The main editions of Mutus Liber are the following:

- 1867 by Thibaud publishing house in Clermont Ferrand;
- 1914, by Nourry, prefaced by Pierre Dujois, alias Magophon;
- 1943, by Paul Derain, the publisher;
- 1966 by Pauvert publishers, prefaced by Eugène Canseliert;
- 1967 by L'Unité publishers, prefaced by Serge Hutin;
- 1991 Edition Weber, Amsterdam, introduction by Jean Laplace. All plates in facsimile, 19 x 28 cm on art paper. With the three prefaces and in depth commentaries by E. Canseliet in his edition of 1966, translated into German by Martin P. Steiner;
- 2015 by Editions à l'Envers, with new plates by Raymond Meyer.

== History of attributions of authorship ==
Mutus Liber clearly indicates the names of its author and of its inventor. The former is Altus, a "scholar in high chemistry of Hermès". The latter is Jacob Saulat, Sire of Marez. However, these assertions were soon proven to be fictitious, thus the authorship of Mutus Liber has long been in doubt.

Rev. Arcère, a noted historian of La Rochelle, claims that Jacob Tollé is the author though his very existence was even put in doubt. Tollé was in fact a Rochelais doctor reputed for using chemistry and mastering perspective. These two qualities account for the fact that he was acknowledged as the author for a long time. Jean Flouret established that the author of Mutus Liber was Isaac Baulot.

Using clues in Mutus Liber and contemporary documents, Patrick Sembel suggests three people were involved with Isaac Baulot. Abrahaim Thévenin probably worked on the plates, as the presence of his monetary symbol on the first illustrated page of Mutus Liber indicates. Elie Bouhéreau and Elie Richard must have contributed to the conception of the book. As doctors and scholars who used chemistry, they would have had many contacts who would facilitate publishing the book. Elie Richard studied at Groningen with Des Maretz, a philosopher whose name is used to designate the person who discovered Mutus Liber. Elie Bouhéreau knew Valentin Conrard, a secretary of the Académie française, as well as many major authors and philosophers of the time. It is he who attributed authorship of Mutus Liber to Isaac Baulot.

== Interpretations ==
The form of Mutus Liber means that is open to various interpretations. Four ways of reading the book may be distinguished.

The most widespread reading is that of 'initiated alchemists', started off by Pierre Dujols, under the pseudonym of Magophon. It is carried on by Eugène Canseliet and Serge Hutin. These authors say that Mutus Liber shows how to proceed to achieve the magnum opus, whose ultimate purpose is to obtain the philosopher's stone.

Carl Gustav Jung studied Mutus Liber, and owned a copy of the 1677 edition. He used it namely to illustrate his work entitled Psychology and Alchemy. In this book Jung explains how alchemy is speculative thinking looking for the spiritual equilibrium whose metaphorical form would be the philosopher's stone. This process is accompanied by the creation of a repertoire of mental pictures, or archetypes, which would gradually lead to a collective unconscious.

More recently Lee Stavenhagen worked on the narrative structure used to illustrate Mutus Liber.

In their research Jean Flouret and Patrick Sembel have been trying to define the contents of Mutus Liber by putting it into its religious, intellectual and scientific context.

== External resources ==
- Jung's 1677 copy can be consulted on e-rara : https://www.e-rara.ch/cgj/content/titleinfo/1350330
- The different versions on Mutus Liber kept at the National Library (BNF) : https://data.bnf.fr/documents-by-rdt/13334743/a/page1
- The preface by Pierrs Dujols, alias Magaphon, on the BNAM site : http://bnam.fr/IMG/pdf/hypotypo2.pdf
- The commentary on Mutus Liber by Serge Hutin : https://www.esoblogs.net/523/le-mutus-liber-planche-1/
- The radio programme in which Patrick Sembel talks about Mutus Liber : https://rcf.fr/culture/patrimoine/le-mutus-liber-patrick-sembel
- The article which appeared in the Sud Ouest newspaper on 15 July 2015 : https://www.sudouest.fr/2015/07/15/l-historien-qui-veut-faire-parler-le-livre-muet-2020118-1391.php
- Mutus Liber, downloadable as PDF at the US Library of Congress : https://www.loc.gov/item/10018432/
