= Cohobation =

Pre-modern chemical and alchemical process of repeated distillation

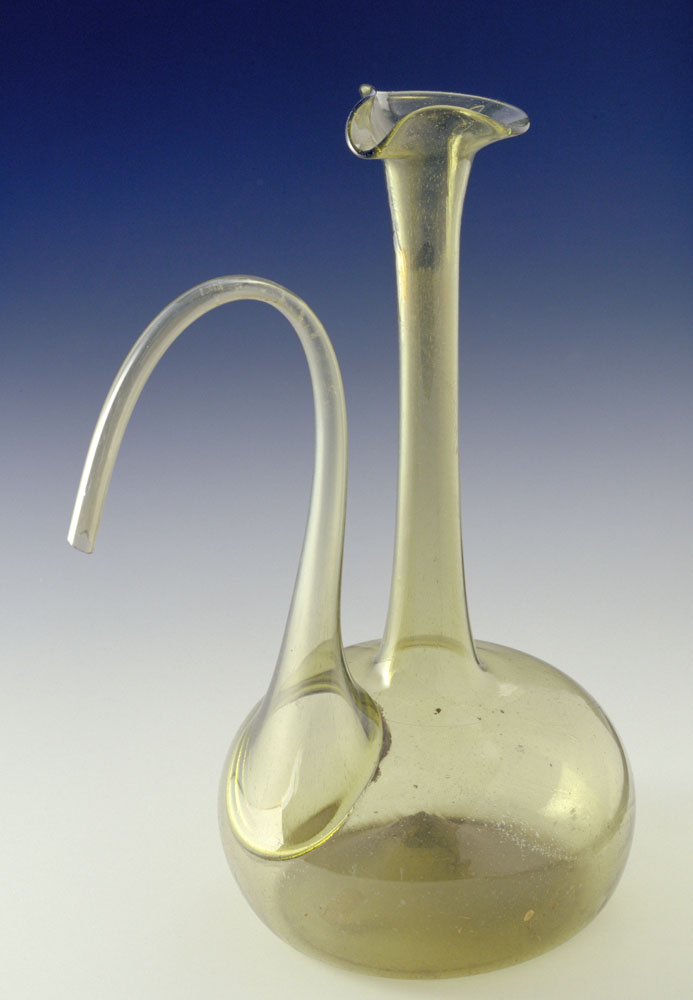
Bottle with curved pouring pipe for cohobation at the Museo Galileo, Florence

In pre-modern chemistry and alchemy, cohobation was the process of repeated distillation of the same matter, with the liquid drawn from it (successive redistillation); that liquid being poured again and again upon the matter left at the bottom of the vessel. Cohobation is a kind of circulation, only differing from it in this, that the liquid is drawn off in cohobation, as in common distillation, and thrown back again; whereas in circulation, it rises and falls in the same vessel, without ever being drawn out.

Cohobation is not recognized as a useful process in modern chemistry. Indeed, it is equivalent to performing the same distillation a number of times and does not increase the purity of the distillate or alter the residue any more than would be done by maintaining it at elevated temperature for the same period of time. The Dean-Stark trap does involve returning some distillate to the reaction flask: a solution is distilled and the condensed liquid is collected in a tube wherein water settles to the bottom and is drained out, while an organic solvent returns to the boiling solution. However, the process is not manual, most of the solvent does not leave the reaction flask, and the apparatus achieves a useful purpose (removing water from the reaction mixture). Circulation, on the other hand, is approximately the same as reflux, where a solution is maintained at its boiling point by condensing the distilling vapors and returning them directly to the reaction mixture.
