= Johann Daniel Mylius =

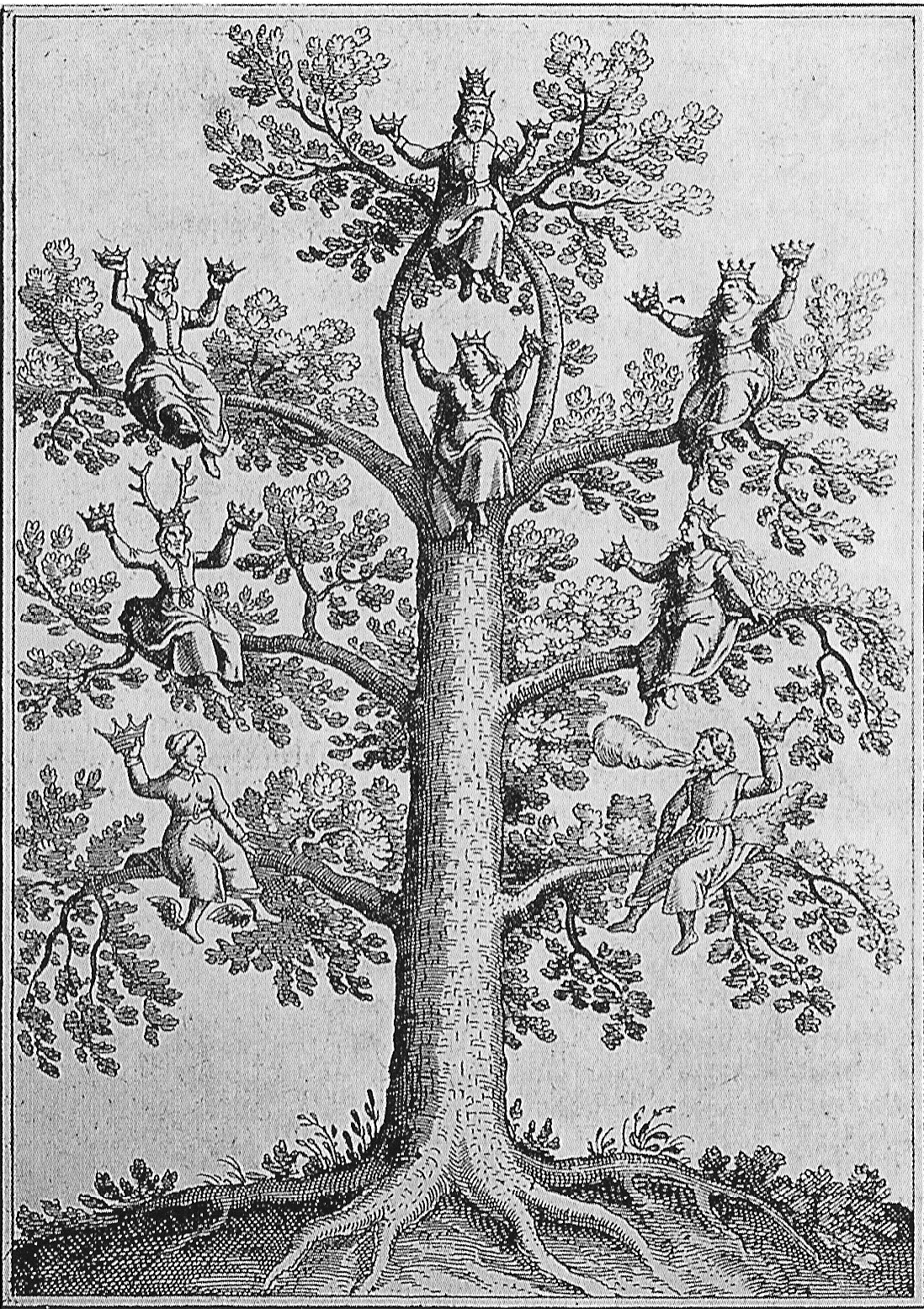
Illustration from Mylius' 1628 Anatomia auri

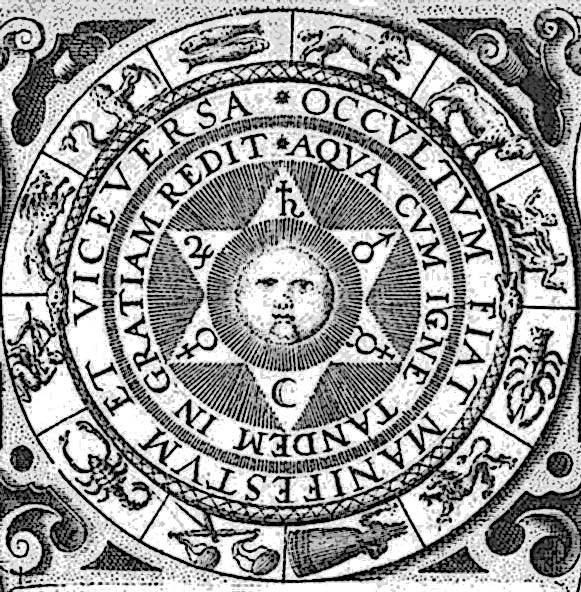
Illustration from Mylius' 1618 Opus medico-chymicum

Johann Daniel Mylius (c. 1583 – 1642) was a composer for the lute, and writer on alchemy. Born at Wetter in present-day Hesse, Germany, he went on to study theology and medicine at the University of Marburg. He was the brother-in-law and pupil of Johann Hartmann (1568–1613).

In 1616, while still a medical student, Mylius published Duncan Burnet's Iatrochymicus. The Opus medico-chymicum, Mylius' own alchemical work, was published two years later. He is known for the collection Thesaurus gratiarum (1622) of pieces for the lute. In the same year his Philosophia Reformata was published. Mylius was the personal physician of Moritz of Hessen and his patrons included Maurice and Frederick Henry of Nassau.

== Works ==
- Opus medico-chymicum. 1618.
- Antidotarium. 1620.
- Philosophia reformata. 1622.
- Anatomia auri. 1628.
- Danielis Milii Pharmacopoeae spagyricae, sive Practicae universalis Galeno-chymicae libri duo. - Francofurti : Schönwetter, 1628. digital edition
