= Projection (alchemy) =

Transmuting a lesser substance into a higher form

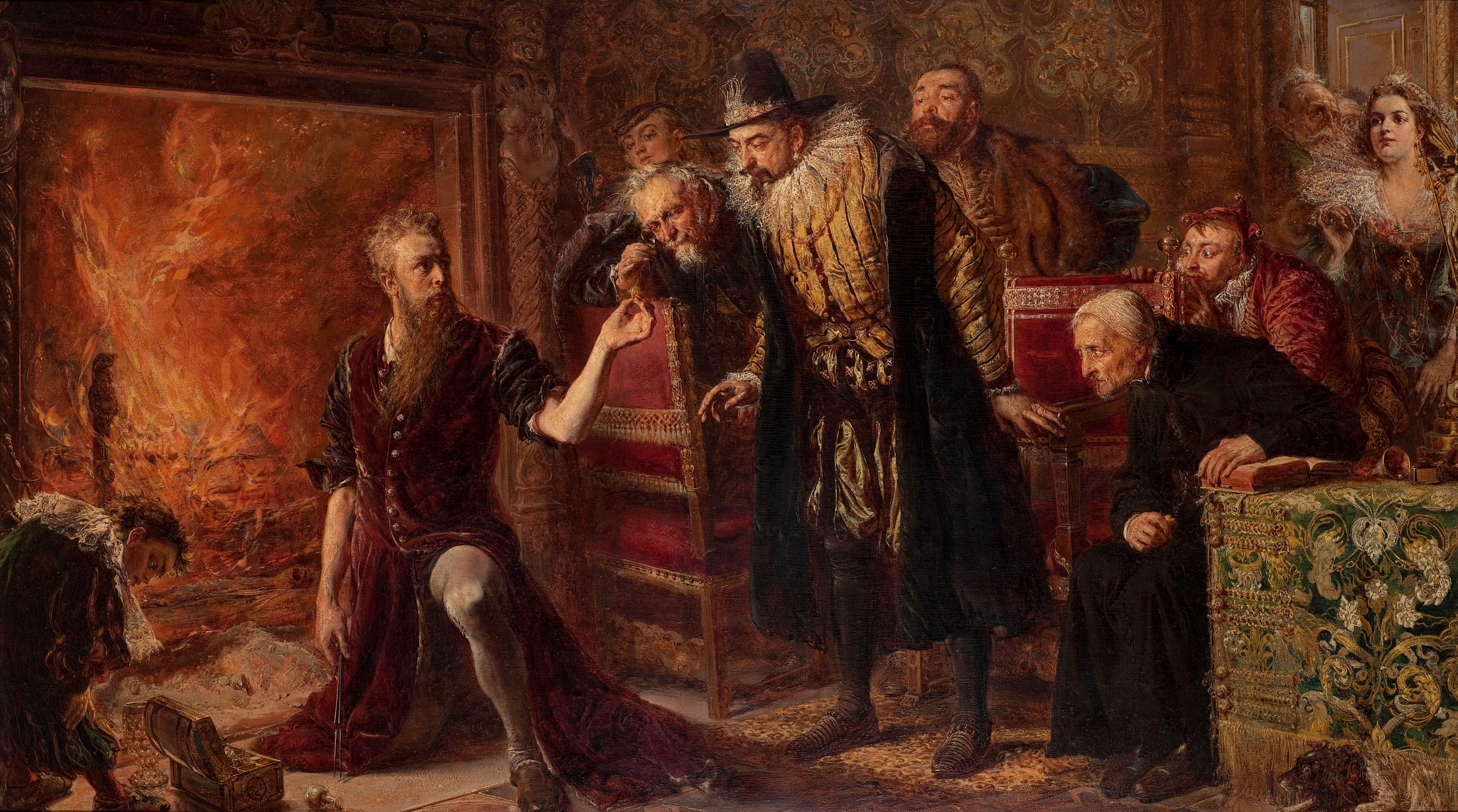
Depiction of Sedziwój performing a transmutation for Sigismund III by Jan Matejko, 1867

Projection was the ultimate goal of Western alchemy. Once the philosopher's stone or powder of projection had been created, the process of projection would be used to transmute a lesser substance into a higher form; often lead into gold.

Typically, the process is described as casting a small portion of the Stone into a molten base metal.

== Claims and demonstrations ==
The seventeenth century saw an increase in tales of physical transmutation and projection. These are variously explained as examples of charlatanism, fiction, pseudo-scientific error, or missed metaphor. The following is a typical account of the projection process described by Jan Baptista van Helmont in his De Natura Vitae Eternae.

I have seen and I have touched the Philosopher’s Stone more than once. The color of it was like saffron in powder, but heavy and shining like pounded glass. I had once given me the fourth of a grain - I call a grain that which takes 600 to make an ounce. I made projection with this fourth part of a grain wrapped in paper upon eight ounces of quicksilver heated in a crucible. The result of the projection was eight ounces, lacking eleven grains, of the most pure gold.

Other reports include:

- Elias Ashmole's Theatrum Chemicum Britannicum lists an account of Edward Kelley making projections from lesser metals into both gold and silver. Kelley's success is also recorded by John Dee.
- Alexander Seton was reported to have projected a heavy yellow powder onto a mixture of lead and sulphur resulting in a button of gold.
- A variety of accounts are given of Sendivogius performing public transmutations.
- In legend, Nicolas Flamel makes a projection of the red stone onto mercury, making gold.

While it may not account for all claims of metallic transmutation, some alchemists of this time period give accounts of fraudulent projection demonstrations, distinguishing themselves from the projectors. Maier's Examen Fucorum Pseudo-chymicorum and Khunrath's Treuhertzige Warnungs-Vermahnung list tricks used by pseudo-alchemists. Accounts are given of double-bottomed crucibles used to conceal hidden gold during projection demonstrations.

== In art and entertainment ==
The concept of projection appears in various fictional works related to alchemy. It's a notable theme in Ben Jonson's The Alchemist where the following dialogue can be found, commenting on fraudulent applications of projection:

When do you make projection?

Son, be not hasty, I exalt our med'cine,
By hanging him in balneo vaporoso,
And giving him solution; then congeal him;
And then dissolve him; then again congeal him;
For look, how oft I iterate the work,
So many times I add unto his virtue.
As, if at first one ounce convert a hundred,
After his second loose, he'll turn a thousand;
His third solution, ten; his fourth, a hundred:
After his fifth, a thousand thousand ounces
Of any imperfect metal, into pure
Silver or gold, in all examinations,
As good as any of the natural mine.
Get you your stuff here against afternoon,
Your brass, your pewter, and your andirons.
