= Corentin Louis Kervran =

French scientist known for his controversial theories on "biological transmutations"

- Born: 3 March 1901; Quimper, Finistère
- Died: 2 February 1983 (aged 81); Quimper, Finistère
- Occupations: Engineer, writer

Corentin Louis Kervran (3 March 1901 – 2 February 1983) was a French scientist. Kervran was born in Quimper, Finistère (Brittany), and received a degree as an engineer in 1925. In World War II he was part of the French Resistance.

Kervran proposed that nuclear transmutation occurs in living organisms, which he called "biological transmutation". He made this claim after experimenting with chickens, which he believed showed that they were generating calcium in their eggshells while there was no calcium in their food or soil. He had no known scientific explanation for it. Such transmutations are not possible according to known physics, chemistry, and biology. Proponents of biological transmutations fall outside mainstream physics and are not part of accepted scientific discourse. Kervran's ideas about biological transmutation have no scientific basis and are considered discredited.

== Biological transmutation ==
In the 1960s, Kervran claimed to have conducted experiments and studies demonstrating violations of the law of conservation of mass by biological systems, according to which the amount of each chemical element is preserved in all chemical reactions. He claimed that organisms can transmute potassium into calcium by nuclear fusion in the course of making an eggshell:

^{39}_{19}K + ^{1}_{1}H → ^{40}_{20}Ca

Since biological systems do not contain mechanisms to produce the speed, temperature, and pressure necessary for such reactions, even for extremely short periods, this contradicts basic physical laws.

Kervran said that prior studies and reports of industrial carbon monoxide accidents supported his work. Kervran said that enzymes can facilitate biological transmutations using the weak nuclear force, by what he called "neutral currents." His response to criticism was to claim that physical laws do not apply to biological reactions, which contradicts the mainstream understanding that physical laws apply for all scales and conditions.

Kervran suggested that under the right conditions, potassium could combine with hydrogen to form calcium. He questioned how chickens fed a diet of oats could produce eggshells composed of calcium carbonate and concluded that the potassium in the oats must combine with hydrogen to produce the calcium. He considered this a "low-energy transmutation" which became known as the "Kervran effect". There is no scientific basis for such an effect.

Italian researchers who studied Kervran's theory in controlled conditions observed no transmutation. Contrary to what Kervran argued, oats are not devoid of calcium. If there isn't enough calcium in a chicken's diet, they will mobilize calcium from their bones. In modern times, chicken feed is often supplemented to ensure adequate calcium intake. Science writer Joe Schwarcz has written that "the bottom line is that the Kervran effect doesn't exist... [he] simply came to the wrong conclusion based on some faulty observations."

In 1993, Kervran was awarded a parodic Ig Nobel prize in Physics due to his "improbable research" in biological transmutation. The award description called him an "ardent admirer of alchemy."

== Organic farming ==
Organic farmers Raoul Lemaire (1884–1972) and Jean Boucher promoted Kervran's discredited theory of biological transmutation, incorporating it into the Lemaire-Boucher organic farming method in the 1960s. They argued that their Lithothamnion-based fertilizer known as Calmagol underwent biological transmutation by transitioning calcium into potassium. Kervran took an interest in organic farming and was a contributor to Henri-Charles Geffroy's La Vie Claire magazine. Kervran's biological transmutation also influenced the macrobiotic diet of George Ohsawa. His book Biological Transmutations was first translated by Michel Abehsera, an Ohsawa disciple, in 1972.

== Books ==
In French:

- Transmutations Biologiques: Métabolismes Aberrants de l'Azote, le Potassium et le Magnésium (1962) Paris : Librairie Maloine S.A. (2nd ed. 1963, 3rd ed. 1965)
- Transmutations naturelles non radioactives; une propriete nouvelle de la matiere Paris : Librairie Maloine, (1963) OCLC 21388057
- Transmutations à la faible énergie : synthèse et développements (1964) Paris : Maloine OCLC 35460556
- A la découverte des transmutations biologiques : une explication des phénomènes biologiques aberrants (1966) Paris : Le Courrier du livre OCLC 30562980
- Preuves Relatives à l'Existence des Transmutations Biologiques (1968) Paris : Librairie Maloine S.A.
- Transmutations biologiques en agronomie (1970) Paris : Librairie Maloine S.A.
- Preuves en géologie et physique de transmutations à faible énergie (1973) Paris : Maloine ISBN 2-224-00053-7 OCLC 914685
- Preuves en biologie de transmutations à faible énergie (1975) Paris, Maloine, S.A. ISBN 2-224-00178-9 OCLC 1603879, (2nd edition, 1995).
- Transmutations Biologique et Physique Moderne (1982) Paris : Librairie Maloine S.A.

English translations:

- Biological Transmutations C. Louis Kervran, translation and adaptation by Michel Abehsera, 1989, 1998 (first published in 1972) ISBN 0-916508-47-1 OCLC 301517796 (extract of three of Kervran's books)
- Biological transmutations, revised and edited by Herbert & Elizabeth Rosenauer, London, Crosby Lockwood 1972 (reprinted by Beekman, New York, in 1998 under ISBN 0-8464-0195-9)
- Biological Transmutation. Natural Alchemy. Louis Kervran and George Ohsawa, George Ohsawa Macrobiotic Foundation, Oroville, California, USA 1971 (reprinted 1975, 1976) 48 pages.

== See also ==
- Cold fusion
- List of Ig Nobel Prize winners
