= Filius philosophorum =

Symbol in alchemy

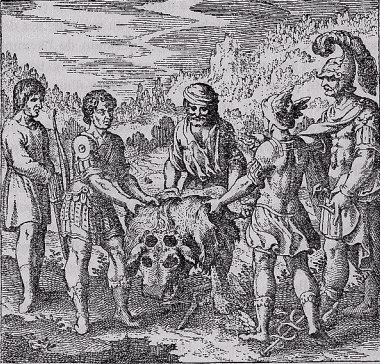
The conception of the philosophical child, allegorized as the conception of Orion by three fathers.

The filius philosophorum (Latin for "the philosophers' child", i.e. made by the true students of philosophy) is a symbol in alchemy. In some texts it is equated with the philosopher's stone (lapis philosophorum), but in others it assumes its own symbolic meanings. Other terms for the filius philosophorum include filius sapientiae ("child of wisdom"), infans noster ("our child"), infans solaris ("sun child"), infans lunaris ("moon child"), and infans solaris lunaris ("sun moon child").

There are several images that have been used to represent the filius philosophorum. Among these are the transformed hermaphroditic Hermes, the child of the Red King and the White Queen (the Sun and Moon), the child of the egg, and the three-fathered Orion.

The filius philosophorum was also one of the Jungian archetypes analyzed by the Swiss psychologist.
