= Rubedo =

Final stage in the alchemical process

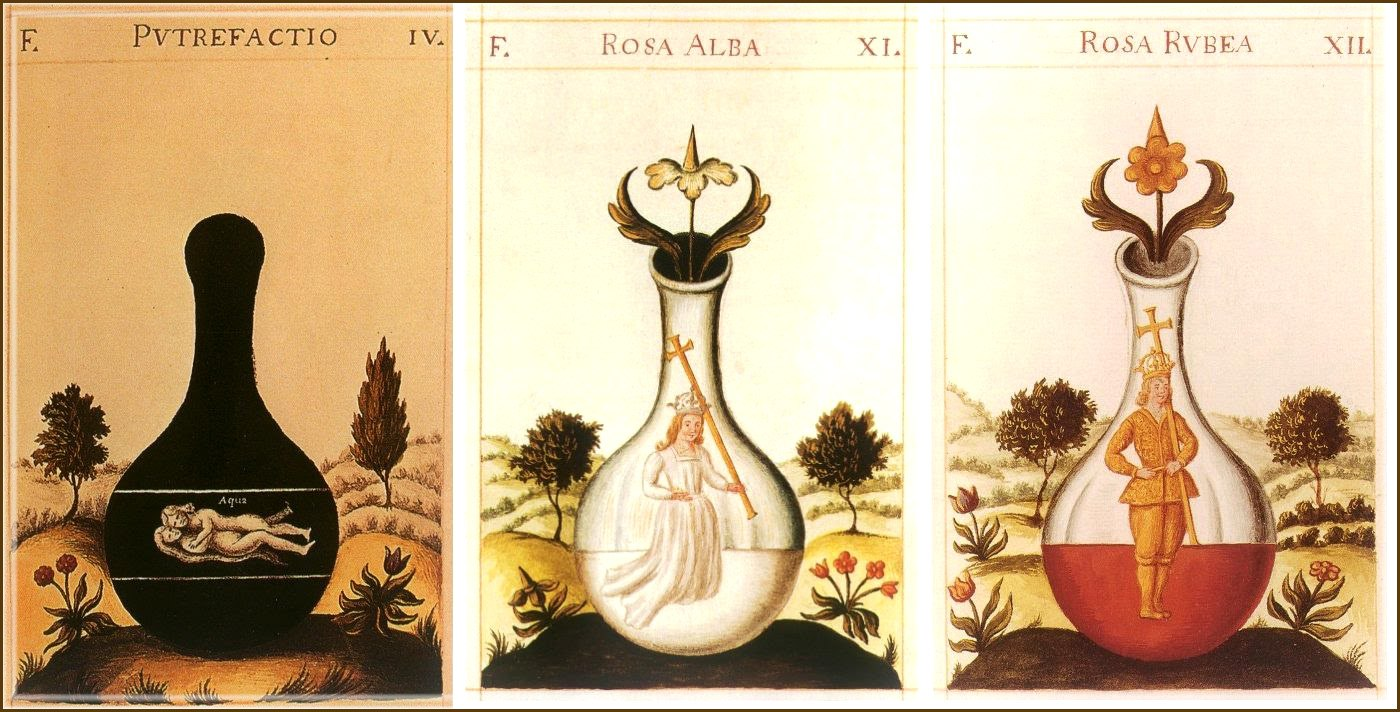
The three phases of the magnum opus: nigredo, albedo and rubedo. (from Pretiosissimum Donum Dei, published by Georges Aurach in 1475)

Rubedo is a Latin word meaning "redness" that was adopted by alchemists to define the fourth and final major stage in their magnum opus. Both gold and the philosopher's stone were associated with the color red, as rubedo signaled alchemical success, and the end of the great work. Rubedo is also known by the Greek word iosis.

== Interpretation ==
The three alchemical stages preceding rubedo were nigredo (blackness), which represented putrefaction and spiritual death; albedo (whiteness), which represented purification; and citrinitas (yellowness), the solar dawn or awakening. Some sources describe the alchemical process as three-phased with citrinitas serving as mere extension and takes place between albedo and rubedo. The rubedo stage entails the attempt of the alchemist to integrate the psychospiritual outcomes of the process into a coherent sense of self before its re-entry to the world. The stage can take some time or years to complete due to the required synthesis and substantiation of insights and experiences.

The symbols used in alchemical writing and art to represent this red stage can include blood, a phoenix, a rose, a crowned king, or a figure wearing red clothes. Countless sources mention a reddening process; the seventeenth dictum of the 12th century Turba Philosophorum is one example:

O Turba of Philosophers and disciples, now hast thou spoken about making into white, but it yet remains to treat concerning the reddening! Know, all ye seekers after this Art, that unless ye whiten, ye cannot make red, because the two natures are nothing other than red and white. Whiten, therefore, the red, and redden the white!

=== Psychology ===
In the framework of psychological development (especially with followers of Jungian psychology), these four alchemical steps are viewed as analogous to the process of attaining individuation or the process that allows an individual to attain the integration of opposites, their transcendence, and, finally, emergence out of an undifferentiated unconscious. In an archetypal schema, rubedo represents the Self archetype, and is the culmination of the four stages, the merging of ego and Self. It is also described as a stage that gives birth to a new personality. Represented by the color of blood in alchemy, the stage indicates a process that cannot be reversed since it involves the struggle of the self towards its manifestation.

The Self manifests itself in "wholeness," a point in which a person discovers their true nature. Another interpretation phrased it as "reunification" which entail the reunion of body, soul, and spirit, leading to a diminished inner conflict.

== See also ==
- Psychology and Alchemy
- Unity of opposites
