= Citrinitas =

Alchemical stage

Citrinitas, or sometimes xanthosis, is a term given by alchemists to "yellowness" or the "yellowing". It is the third of the four major stages of the alchemical magnum opus. In alchemical philosophy, citrinitas stood for the dawning of the "solar light" inherent in one's being, and that the reflective "lunar or soul light" was no longer necessary. The other three alchemical stages were nigredo (blackness/blackening), albedo (whiteness/whitening), and rubedo (redness/reddening).

Psychologist Carl Jung is credited with interpreting the alchemical process as analogous to modern-day psychoanalysis. In the Jungian archetypal schema, nigredo is the Shadow; albedo refers to the anima and animus (contra-sexual soul images); citrinitas is the wise old man (or woman) archetype; and rubedo is the Self archetype which has achieved wholeness.
