= Prima materia =

First or prime matter

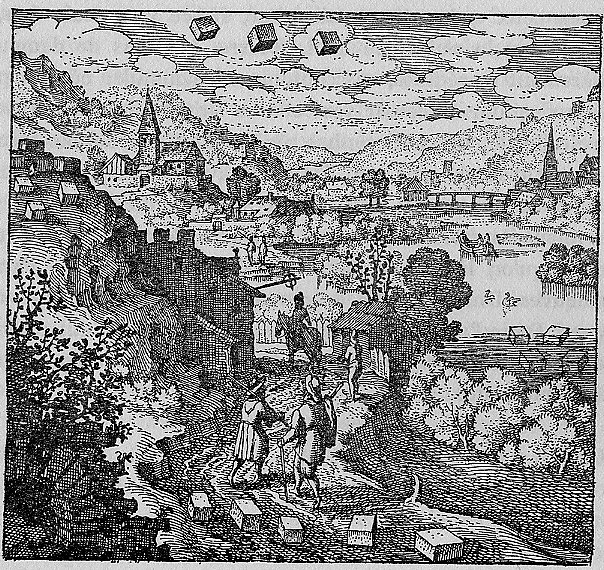
Alchemical emblem depicting the omnipresence of the philosophical matter. "The Stone that is Mercury, is cast upon the Earth, exalted on Mountains, resides in the Air, and is nourished in the Waters." (Michael Maier's Atalanta Fugiens. 1617.) The cubes represent prima materia.

In alchemy and philosophy, prima materia, materia prima, or first matter, is the ubiquitous starting material required for the alchemical magnum opus and the creation of the philosopher's stone. It is the primitive formless base of all matter similar to chaos, the quintessence or aether. Esoteric alchemists describe the prima materia using simile, and compare it to concepts like the anima mundi.

== History ==
The concept of prima materia is sometimes attributed to Aristotle. The earliest roots of the idea can be found in the philosophy of Anaxagoras, who described the nous in relation to chaos. Empedocles' cosmogony is also relevant.

When alchemy developed in Greco-Roman Egypt on the foundations of Greek philosophy, it included the concept of prima materia as a central tenet. Mary Anne Atwood uses words attributed to Arnaldus de Villa Nova to describe the role of prima materia in the fundamental theory of alchemy: "That there abides in nature a certain pure matter, which, being discovered and brought by art to perfection, converts to itself proportionally all imperfect bodies that it touches." Although descriptions of the prima materia have changed throughout history, the concept has remained central to alchemical thought.

== Properties ==
Alchemical authors used similes to describe the universal nature of the prima materia. Arthur Edward Waite states that all alchemical writers concealed its "true name". Since the prima materia has all the qualities and properties of elementary things, the names of all kinds of things were assigned to it. A similar account can be found in the Theatrum Chemicum:

They have compared the "prima materia" to everything, to male and female, to the hermaphroditic monster, to heaven and earth, to body and spirit, chaos, microcosm, and the confused mass; it contains in itself all colors and potentially all metals; there is nothing more wonderful in the world, for it begets itself, conceives itself, and gives birth to itself.

Comparisons have been made to Hyle, the primal fire, Proteus, Light, and Mercury. Martin Ruland the Younger lists more than fifty synonyms for the prima materia in his 1612 alchemical dictionary. His text includes justifications for the names and comparisons. He repeats that, "the philosophers have so greatly admired the Creature of God which is called the Primal Matter, especially concerning its efficacy and mystery, that they have given to it many names, and almost every possible description, for they have not known how to sufficiently praise it." Waite lists an additional eighty four names.

Names assigned to the Prima Materia in Ruland's 1612 alchemical dictionary, Lexicon alchemiae sive dictionarium alchemistarum.

- Microcosmos
- The Philosophical Stone
- The Eagle Stone
- Water of Life
- Venom
- Poison
- Chamber
- Spirit
- Medicine
- Heaven
- Clouds
- Nebula or Fog
- Dew
- Shade
- Moon
- Stella Signata and Lucifer
- Permanent Water
- Fiery and Burning Water
- Salt of Nitre and Saltpetre
- Lye
- Bride, Spouse, Mother, Eve
- Pure and Uncontaminated Virgin
- Milk of Virgin, or the Fig
- Boiling Milk
- Honey
- A Spiritual Blood
- Bath
- A Syrup
- Vinegar
- Lead
- Tin
- Sulphur of Nature
- Spittle of the Moon
- Ore
- The Serpent
- The Dragon
- Marble, Crystal, Glass
- Scottish Gem
- Urine
- Magnesia
- Magnet
- White Ethesia
- White Moisture
- White Smoke
- Dung
- Metallic Entity
- Mercury
- The Soul and Heaven of the Elements
- The Matter of all Forms
- Tartar of the Philosophers
- Dissolved Refuse
- The Rainbow
- Indian Gold
- Heart of the Sun
- Chaos
- Venus
- Healer
- Angel of violet light

== See also ==
- Arche
- Individuation
- Theory of Forms
- Yliaster
- Primordial fluctuations
