= Albedo (alchemy) =

Alchemical concept

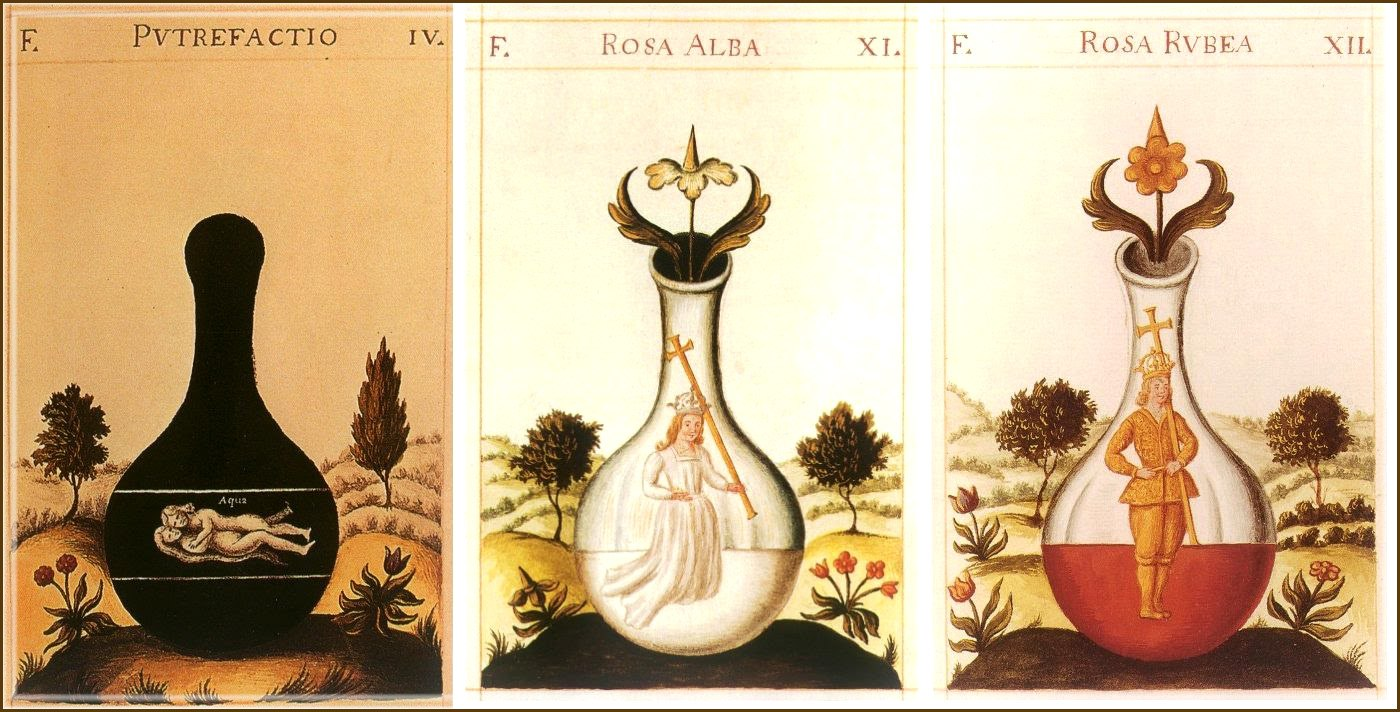
The three phases of the magnum opus: nigredo, albedo and rubedo. (from Pretiosissimum Donum Dei, published by Georges Aurach in 1475)

In alchemy, albedo, or leucosis, is the second of the four major stages of the Magnum Opus, along with nigredo, citrinitas and rubedo. It is a Latinicized term meaning "whiteness". Following the chaos or massa confusa of the nigredo stage, the alchemist undertakes a purification in albedo, which is literally referred to as ablutio – the washing away of impurities. This phase is concerned with "bringing light and clarity to the prima materia (the First Matter)".

In this process, the subject is divided into two opposing principles to be later coagulated to form a unity of opposites or coincidentia oppositorum during rubedo. Alchemists also applied it to an individual's soul after the first phase is completed, which entailed the decay of matter. In Medieval literature, which developed an intricate system of images and symbols for alchemy, the dove often represented this stage, while the raven symbolized nigredo.

Titus Burckhardt interprets the albedo as the end of the lesser work, corresponding to a spiritualization of the body, and claims that the goal of this portion of the process is to regain the original purity and receptivity of the soul.

== Psychology ==
Psychologist Carl Jung equated the albedo with unconscious contrasexual soul images; the anima in men and animus in women. It is a phase where insight into shadow projections are realized, and inflated ego and unneeded conceptualizations are removed from the psyche. Another interpretation describes albedo as an experience of awakening and involves a shift in consciousness where the world becomes more than just an individual's ego, his family, or country.

== See also ==
- Citrinitas
- Magnum opus (alchemy)
- Nigredo
- Rubedo
