= Nigredo =

Term used in alchemy and Jungian psychology

In alchemy, nigredo, or blackness, means putrefaction or decomposition. Many alchemists believed that as a first step in the pathway to the philosopher's stone, all alchemical ingredients had to be cleansed and cooked extensively to a uniform black matter.

In analytical psychology, the term became a metaphor for "the dark night of the soul, when an individual confronts the shadow within."

== Jung ==
For Carl Jung, "the rediscovery of the principles of alchemy came to be an important part of my work as a pioneer of psychology". As a student of alchemy, he (and his followers) "compared the 'black work' of the alchemists (the nigredo) with the often highly critical involvement experienced by the ego, until it accepts the new equilibrium brought about by the creation of the self." Jungians interpreted nigredo in two main psychological senses.

The first sense represented a subject's initial state of undifferentiated unawareness, "the first nigredo, that of the unio naturalis, is an objective state, visible from the outside only ... an unconscious state of non-differentiation between self and object, consciousness and the unconscious." Here the subject is unaware of the unconscious; i.e. the connection with the instincts.

In the second sense, "the nigredo of the process of individuation on the other hand is a subjectively experienced process brought about by the subject's painful, growing awareness of his shadow aspects." It could be described as a moment of maximum despair, that is a prerequisite to personal development. As individuation unfolds, so "confrontation with the shadow produces at first a dead balance, a standstill that hampers moral decisions and makes convictions ineffective or even impossible ... nigredo, tenebrositas, chaos, melancholia." Here is "the darkest time, the time of despair, disillusionment, envious attacks; the time when Eros and Superego are at daggers drawn, and there seems no way forward ... nigredo, the blackening."

Only subsequently would come "an enantiodromia; the nigredo gives way to the albedo ... the ever deepening descent into the unconscious suddenly becomes illumination from above."

Further steps of the alchemical opus include such images as albedo (whiteness), citrinitas (yellowness), and rubedo (redness). Jung also found psychological equivalents for many other alchemical concepts, with "the characterization of analytic work as an opus; the reference to the analytic relationship as a vas, vessel or container; the goal of the analytic process as the coniunctio, or union of conflicting opposites."

== Cultural references ==
- In the alchemical literary discourse Hydriotaphia, Urn Burial (1658) the meditative nigredo stage is described as "lost in the uncomfortable night of nothing" by the physician-philosopher Thomas Browne.
- Shakespeare's sonnets are dense with the symbolism of the "nigredo" ... "ghastly night".
- W. B. Yeats in his alchemical stories introduces the alchemical phase of the nigredo. The narrator begins "to struggle again with the shadow, as with some older night".
- In the Japanese light-novel and anime series Overlord, there exists a character called Nigredo. Her two sisters are called Albedo and Rubedo, all three named after the parts of the Magnum Opus.

== See also ==
- Dark Night of the Soul
- Nekyia
