= Alchemy in the medieval Islamic world =

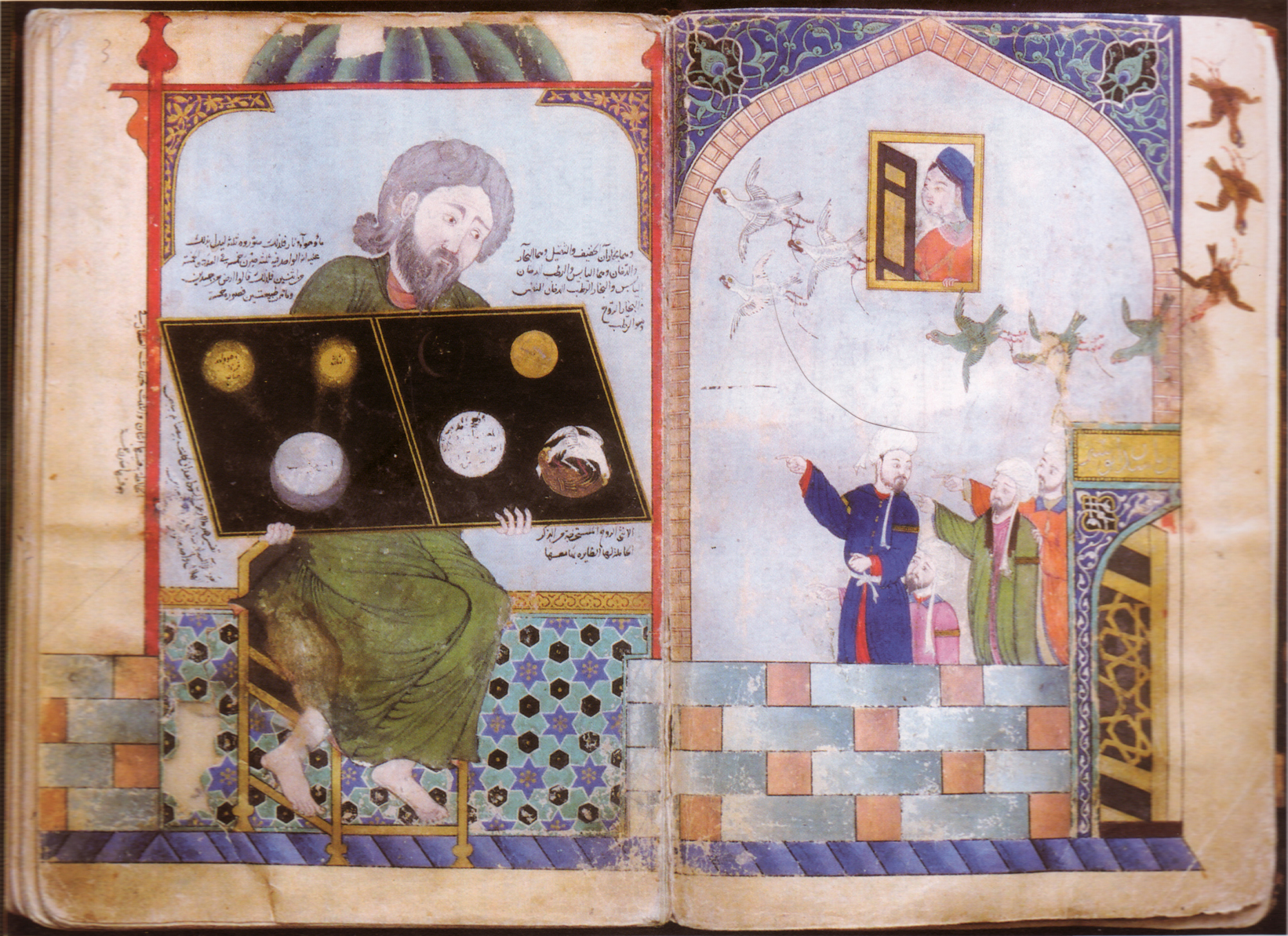
Ibn Umail describes a statue of a sage holding the tablet of ancient alchemical knowledge. Illustration from a transcript of Muhammed ibn Umail al-Tamimi's book Al-mâ' al-waraqî (The Silvery Water), Islamic miniature probably from Baghdad, 608H/1211.

Alchemy in the medieval Islamic world refers to both traditional alchemy and early practical chemistry (the early chemical investigation of nature in general) by Muslim scholars in the medieval Islamic world. The word alchemy was derived from the Arabic word الكيمياء (al-kīmyāʾ), which itself may derive either from the Egyptian word kemi ('black') or from the Greek word khumeia ('fusion').

After the fall of the Western Roman Empire and the Islamic conquest of Roman Egypt, the focus of alchemical development moved to the Caliphate and Islamic civilization.

== Definition and relationship with medieval western sciences ==
In considering Islamic sciences as a distinct, local practice, it is important to define words such as "Arabic", "Islamic", "alchemy", and "chemistry" in order to gain an understanding of what these terms mean historically. This may also help to clear up any misconceptions regarding the possible differences between alchemy and early chemistry in the context of medieval times. As A. I. Sabra writes in his article entitled, "Situating Arabic Science: Location versus Essence", "the term Arabic (or Islamic) science denotes the scientific activities of individuals who lived in a region that roughly extended chronologically from the eighth century AD to the beginning of the modern era, and geographically from the Iberian Peninsula and North Africa to the Indus valley and from southern Arabia to the Caspian Sea—that is, the region covered for most of that period by what we call Islamic civilization, and in which the results of the activities referred to were for the most part expressed in the Arabic language." This definition of Arabic science provides a sense that there are many distinguishing factors to contrast with science of the West regarding physical location, culture, and language, though there are also several similarities in the goals pursued by scientists of the Middle Ages, and in the origins of thinking from which both were derived.

Lawrence Principe describes the relationship between alchemy and chemistry in his article entitled, "Alchemy Restored", in which he states, "The search for metallic transmutation—what we call 'alchemy' but that is more accurately termed 'Chrysopoeia'—was ordinarily viewed in the late seventeenth century as synonymous with or as a subset of chemistry." He therefore proposes that the early spelling of chemistry as "chymistry" refers to a unified science including both alchemy and early chemistry. Principe goes on to argue that, "[a]ll their chymical activities were unified by a common focus on the analysis, synthesis, transformation, and production of material substances." Therefore, there is not a defined contrast between the two fields until the early 18th century. Though Principe's discussion is centered on the Western practice of alchemy and chemistry, this argument is supported in the context of Islamic science as well when considering the similarity in methodology and Aristotelian inspirations, as noted in other sections of this article. This distinction between alchemy and early chemistry is one that lies predominantly in semantics, though with an understanding of previous uses of the words, we can better understand the historical lack of distinct connotations regarding the terms despite their altered connotations in modern contexts.

The transmission of these sciences throughout the East and West is also important to understand when distinguishing the sciences of both regions. The beginnings of cultural, religious, and scientific diffusion of information between the Western and Eastern societies began with the successful conquests of Alexander the Great (334–323 BC). By establishing territory throughout the East, Alexander the Great allowed greater communication between the East and West that would continue throughout history. A thousand years later, those Asian territories conquered by Alexander the Great, such as Iraq and Iran, became a center of religious movements with a focus on Christianity, Manicheism, and Zoroastrianism, which all involve sacred texts as a basis, thus encouraging literacy, scholarship, and the spread of ideas. Aristotelian logic was soon included in the curriculum a center for higher education in Nisibis, located east of the Persian border, and was used to enhance the philosophical discussion of theology taking place at the time. The Qur'an, the holy book of Islam, became an important source of "theology, morality, law, and cosmology", in what David C. Lindberg describes as "the centerpiece of Islamic education." After the death of Muhammad in 632, Islam was extended throughout the Arabian peninsula, parts of Byzantium, Persia, Syria, Egypt, and Palestine by means of military conquest, solidifying the region as a predominantly Muslim one. While the expansion of the Islamic empire was an important factor in diminishing political barriers between such areas, there was still a wide range of religions, beliefs, and philosophies that could move freely and be translated throughout the regions. This development made way for contributions to be made on behalf of the East towards the Western conception of sciences such as alchemy.

While this transmission of information and practices allowed for the further development of the field, and though both were inspired by Aristotelian logic and Hellenic philosophies, as well as by mystical aspects it is also important to note that cultural and religious boundaries remained. The mystical and religious elements discussed previously in the article distinguished Islamic alchemy from that of its Western counterpart, given that the West had predominantly Christian ideals on which to base their beliefs and results, while the Islamic tradition differed greatly. While the motives differed in some ways, as did the calculations, the practice and development of alchemy and chemistry was similar given the contemporaneous nature of the fields and the ability with which scientists could transmit their beliefs.

=== Contributions of Islamic alchemists to mystical alchemy ===
Marie-Louise von Franz describes in her introduction to Ibn Umail's "Book of the Explanation of the Symbols—Kitāb Ḥall ar-Rumūz" the contributions of Islamic alchemy as follows: In the 7th to 8th century, Islamic scholars were mainly concerned with translating ancient Hermetic-Gnostic texts without changing them. Gradually they began "'confronting' their content with the Islamic religion" and began "to think independently and experiment themselves in the realm of alchemy". Thus they added "an emphasis on the monotheistic outlook" (tawḥīd) and more and more creating a synopsis of the diverse antique traditions. Thus unifying their meaning, the Islamic scholars arrived at the idea, that the secret and aim of alchemy were the achievement of "one inner psychic experience, namely the God-image" and that stone, water, prima materia etc. were "all aspects of the inner mystery through which the alchemist unites with the transcendent God". Secondly, they added "a passionate feeling tone" by using much more a poetic language than the antique Hermetists did, also giving "a greater emphasis on the coniunctio motif", i.e. images of the union of male and female, sun and moon, king and queen etc. "The mystical masters of Islam understood alchemy as a transformative process of the alchemist's psyche. The fire which promoted this transformation was the love of God."

== Alchemists and works ==
=== Khālid ibn Yazīd ===
According to the bibliographer Ibn al-Nadīm, the first Muslim alchemist was Khālid ibn Yazīd, who is said to have studied alchemy under the Christian Marianos of Alexandria. The historicity of this story is not clear; according to M. Ullmann, it is a legend. According to Ibn al-Nadīm and Ḥajjī Khalīfa, he is the author of the alchemical works Kitāb al-kharazāt (The Book of Pearls), Kitāb al-ṣaḥīfa al-kabīr (The Big Book of the Roll), Kitāb al-ṣaḥīfa al-saghīr (The Small Book of the Roll), Kitāb Waṣīyatihi ilā bnihi fī-ṣ-ṣanʿa (The Book of his Testament to his Son about the Craft), and Firdaws al-ḥikma (The Paradise of Wisdom), but again, these works may be pseudepigraphical.

=== Jābir ibn Ḥayyān ===
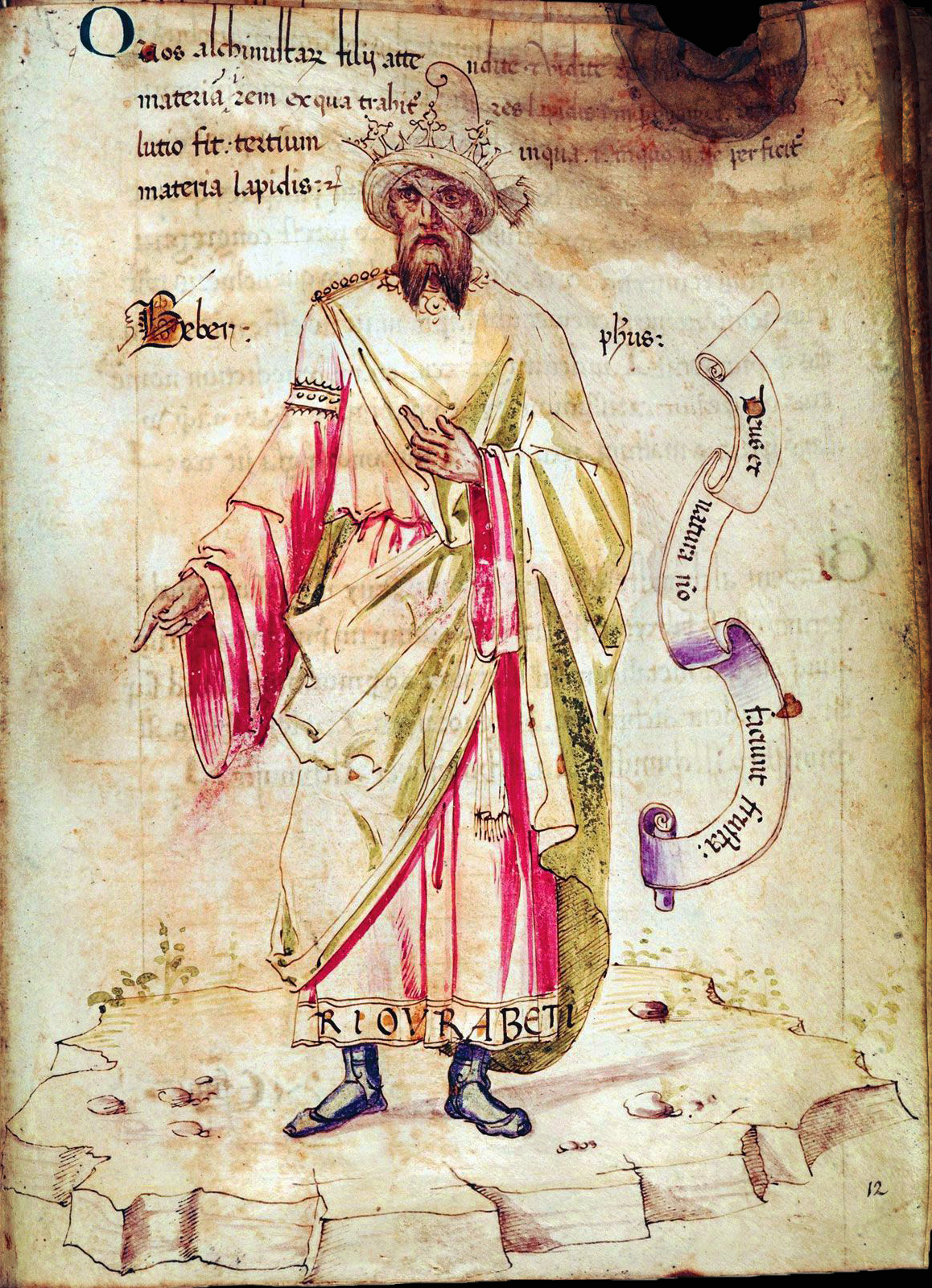
15th-century artistic impression of Jābir ibn Ḥayyān (Geber)

Jābir ibn Ḥayyān (Arabic/Persian: جابر بن حیان, died c. 806−816) is the supposed author of an enormous number and variety of works in Arabic often called the Jabirian corpus. Popularly known as the father of chemistry, Jabir's works contain the oldest known systematic classification of chemical substances, and the oldest known instructions for deriving an inorganic compound (sal ammoniac or ammonium chloride) from organic substances (such as plants, blood, and hair) by chemical means. Some Arabic Jabirian works (e.g., the "Book of Mercy", and the "Book of Seventy") were later translated into Latin under the Latinized name "Geber". In 13th-century Europe an anonymous writer, usually referred to as pseudo-Geber, started to produce alchemical and metallurgical writings under this name.

=== Abū Bakr al-Rāzī ===
Abū Bakr ibn Zakariyā' al-Rāzī (Latin: Rhazes), born around 865 in Rayy, was mainly known as a Persian physician. He wrote a number of alchemical works, including the Sirr al-asrār (Latin: Secretum secretorum; English: Secret of Secrets.)

=== Ibn Umayl ===
Muḥammad ibn Umayl al-Tamīmī was a 10th-century Egyptian alchemist of the symbolic-mystical branch. One of his surviving works is Kitāb al-māʿ al-waraqī wa-l-arḍ al-najmiyya (The Book on Silvery Water and Starry Earth). This work is a commentary on his poem, the Risālat al-shams ilā al-hilāl (The Epistle of the Sun to the Crescent Moon) and contains numerous quotations from ancient authors. Ibn Umayl had important influence on medieval Western (Latin) alchemy, where his work is found under different names, mainly as Senior or as Zadith. His "Silvery Water" e.g. was reprinted as "The Chemical Tables of Senior Zadith" in the collection of alchemical texts: Theatrum Chemicum, and commented upon by Pseudo Aquinas in Aurora Consurgens. They both also give his (modified) image of the sage holding a chemical table (see image above).

=== Al-Tughrai ===
Al-Tughrai was an 11th-12th century Persian physician. whose work the Masabih al-hikma wa-mafatih al-rahma (The Lanterns of Wisdom and the Keys of Mercy) is one of the earliest works of material sciences.

=== Al-Jildaki ===
Al-Jildaki was an Egyptian alchemist who urged in his book the need for experimental chemistry and mentioned many experiments Kanz al-ikhtisas fi ma'rifat al-khawas by Abu 'l-Qasim Aydamir al-Jildaki.

== Jewish involvement ==
Evidence from the Cairo Geniza also reveals significant Jewish engagement with alchemy in the Islamic World during the Middle Ages. Over a hundred alchemical fragments—mostly practical recipes written in Hebrew or Judeo-Arabic—have been preserved, focusing on metal transmutation and aligned with Islamic operative traditions. These texts were likely used by practicing alchemists, as suggested by their direct language and codicological features. While most material is practical, the Geniza also contains references to Greco-Arabic alchemical theory, including mentions of Jābir ibn Ḥayyān, Ibn Umayl, Ibn Waḥshiyya, Khālid ibn Yazīd, and Hermes, as well as a Hebrew translation of the Liber de Mineralibus Aristotelis. In other instances, Jewish authors, such as Joseph Solomon Delmedigo, are credited with alchemical treatises.

== Alchemical and chemical theory ==
Elemental scheme used by Jābir
	Hot	Cold
Dry	Fire	Earth
Moist	Air	Water

Jābir analyzed each Aristotelian element in terms of Aristotle's four basic qualities of hotness, coldness, dryness, and moistness. For example, fire is a substance that is hot and dry, as shown in the table. According to Jābir, in each metal two of these qualities were interior and two were exterior. For example, lead was externally cold and dry but internally hot and moist; gold, on the other hand, was externally hot and moist but internally cold and dry. He believed that metals were formed in the Earth by fusion of sulfur (giving the hot and dry qualities) with mercury (giving the cold and moist.) These elements, mercury and sulfur, should be thought of as not the ordinary elements but ideal, hypothetical substances. Which metal is formed depends on the purity of the mercury and sulfur and the proportion in which they come together. The later alchemist al-Rāzī (c. 865–925) followed Jābir's mercury-sulfur theory, but added a third, salty, component.

Thus, Jābir theorized, by rearranging the qualities of one metal, a different metal would result. By this reasoning, the search for the philosopher's stone was introduced to Western alchemy. Jābir developed an elaborate numerology whereby the root letters of a substance's name in Arabic, when treated with various transformations, held correspondences to the element's physical properties.

== Processes and equipment ==
Al-Rāzī mentions the following chemical processes: distillation, calcination, solution, evaporation, crystallization, sublimation, filtration, amalgamation, and ceration (a process for making solids pasty or fusible.) Some of these operations (calcination, solution, filtration, crystallization, sublimation and distillation) are also known to have been practiced by pre-Islamic Alexandrian alchemists.

In his Secretum secretorum, Al-Rāzī mentions the following equipment:

- Tools for melting substances (li-tadhwīb): hearth (kūr), bellows (minfākh or ziqq), crucible (bawtaqa), the būt bar būt (in Arabic, from Persian) or botus barbatus (in Latin), ladle (mighrafa or milʿaqa), tongs (māsik or kalbatān), scissors (miqṭaʿ), hammer (mukassir), file (mibrad).
- Tools for the preparation of drugs (li-tadbīr al-ʿaqāqīr): cucurbit and still with evacuation tube (qarʿ or anbīq dhū khatm), receiving matras (qābila), blind still (without evacuation tube) (al-anbīq al-aʿmā), aludel (al-uthāl), goblets (qadaḥ), flasks (qārūra, plural quwārīr), rosewater flasks (mā' wardiyya), cauldron (marjal or tanjīr), earthenware pots varnished on the inside with their lids (qudūr and makabbāt), water bath or sand bath (qidr), oven (al-tannūr in Arabic, athanor in Latin), small cylindirical oven for heating aludel (mustawqid), funnels, sieves, filters, etc.

== See also ==
- Chinese alchemy
- Islamic science
