= Alembic =

Alchemical still

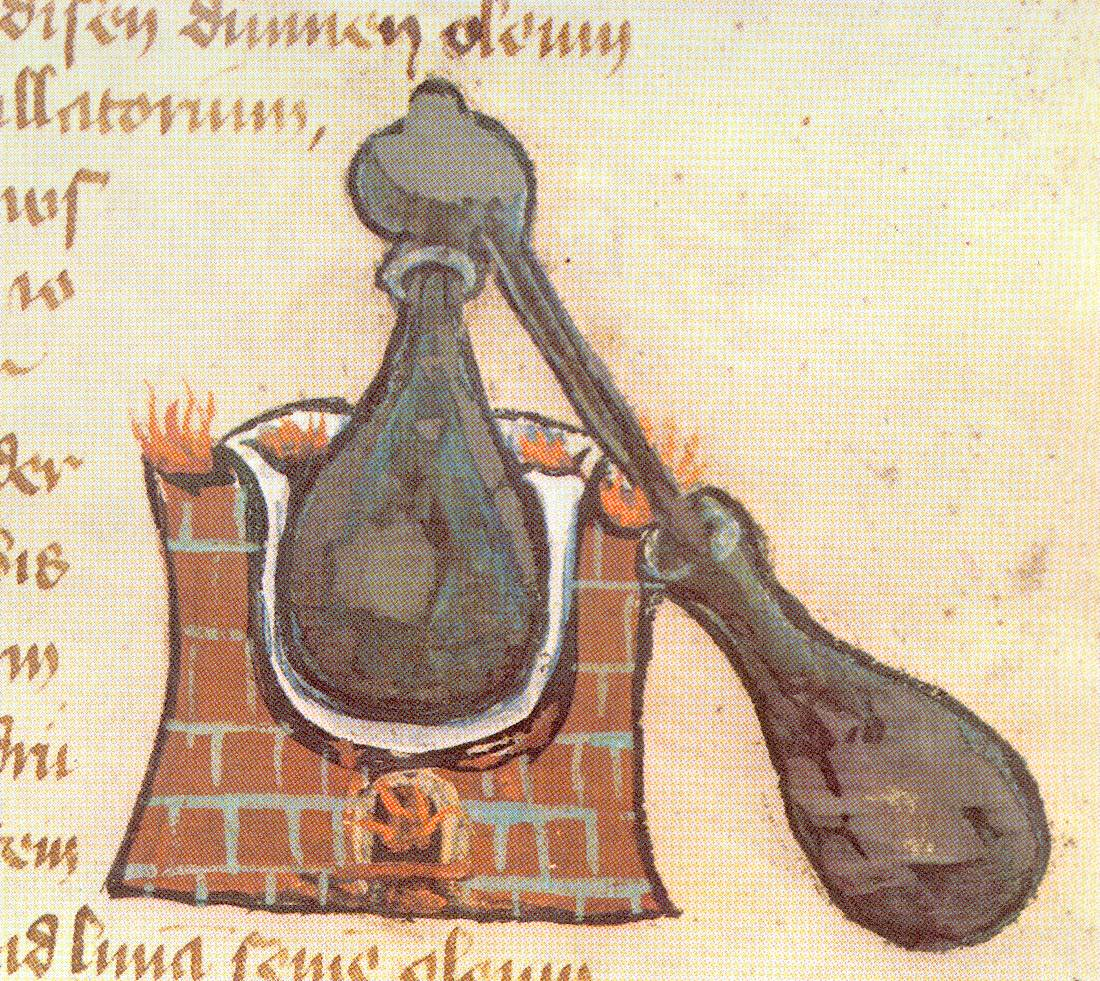
Picture of an alembic from a medieval manuscript

An alembic (from Arabic: الإنبيق, romanized: al-inbīq, originating from Ancient Greek: ἄμβιξ, romanized: ambix, 'cup, beaker') is an alchemical still consisting of two vessels connected by a tube, used for distillation of liquids.

== Description ==
The complete distilling apparatus consists of three parts:

- the "cucurbit" (Arabic: ḳarʿa; Greek: βῖκος, bîkos), the still pot containing the liquid to be distilled, which is heated by a flame
- the "head" or "cap" (إِنْبِيق, ʾinbīq; Greek ἄμβιξ, ambix) which fits over the mouth of the cucurbit to receive the vapors, with an attached downward-sloping "tube" (σωλήν, sōlēn)
- the "receiver" (قَابِلَة, qābila; ἄγγος, angos or φιάλη, phialē) container

In the case of another distilling vessel, the retort, the "cap" and the "cucurbit" have been combined to form a single vessel. The anbik is also called the raʾs (the Arabic word raʾs means "head") of the cucurbit. The liquid in the cucurbit is heated or boiled; the vapour rises into the anbik, where it cools by contact with the walls and condenses, running down the spout into the receiver. A modern descendant of the alembic is the pot still, used to produce distilled beverages.

== History ==
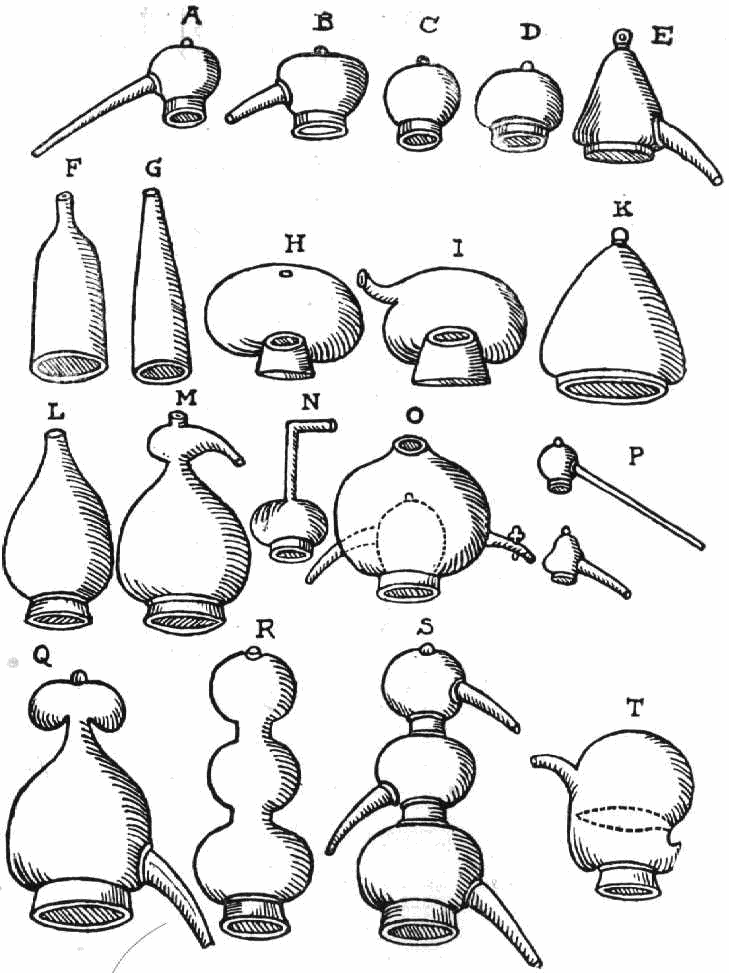
Alembics from a 1606 alchemy book

Dioscorides's ambix, described in his De materia medica (c. 50 C.E.), is a helmet-shaped lid for gathering condensed mercury. For Athenaeus (c. 225 C.E.) it is a bottle or flask. For later chemists it denoted various parts of crude distillation devices.

Alembic drawings appear in works of Cleopatra the Alchemist (3rd century C.E.), Zosimos of Panopolis (c. 300 C.E.), and Synesius (c. 373 – c. 414 C.E.). There were alembics with two (dibikos) and three (tribikos) receivers. According to Zosimos of Panopolis, the alembic was invented by Mary the Jewess.

The anbik is described by Ibn al-Awwam in his Kitab al-Filaha (Book of Agriculture), where he explains how rose-water is distilled. Amongst others, it is mentioned in the Mafatih al-Ulum (Key of Sciences) of Khwarizmi and the Kitab al-Asrar (Book of Secrets) of al-Razi. Some illustrations occur in the Latin translations of works which are attributed to Geber.

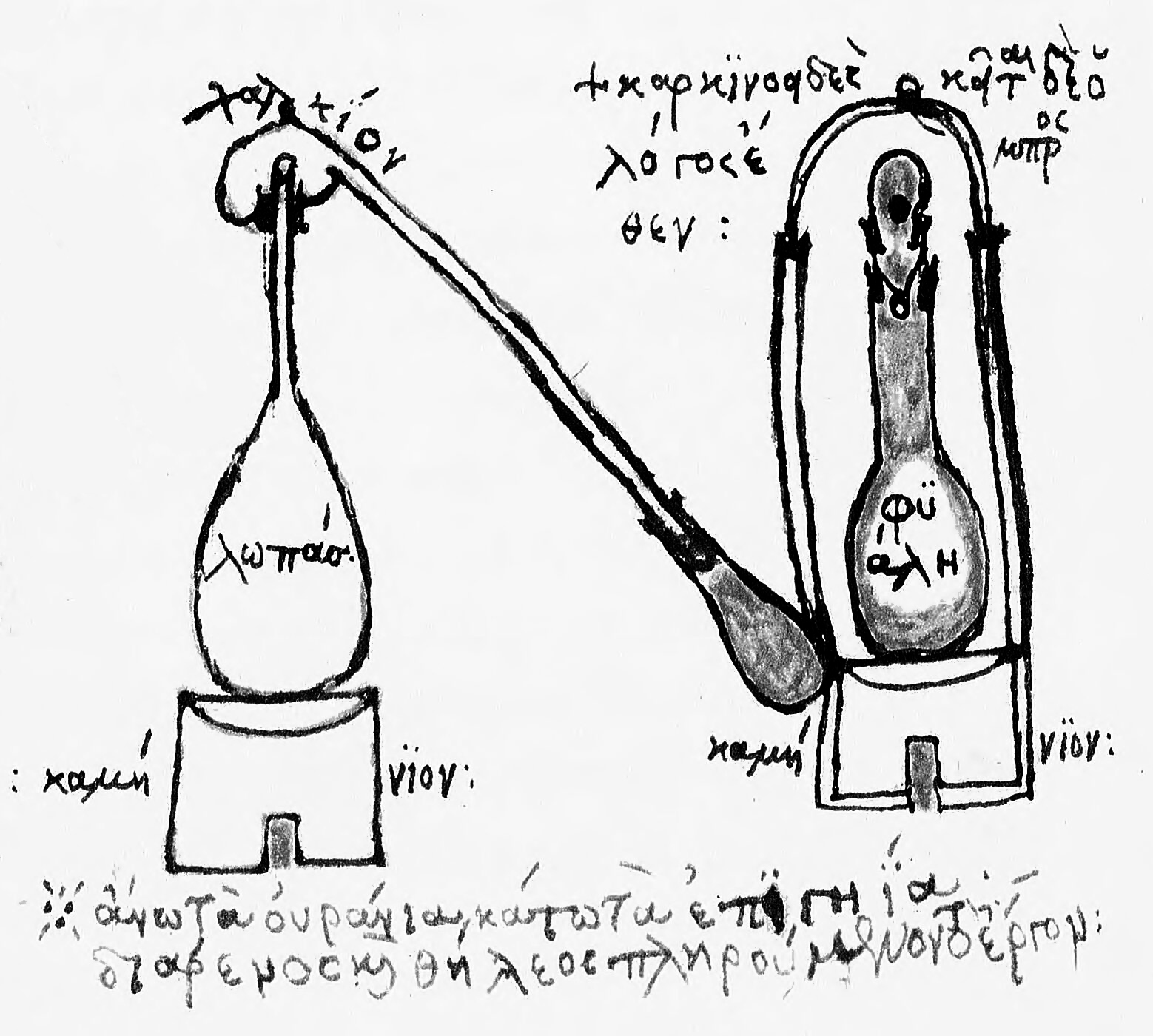
Alembic of Zosimos of Panopolis

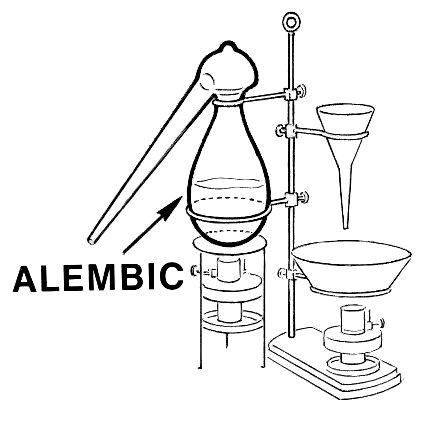
Modern alembic

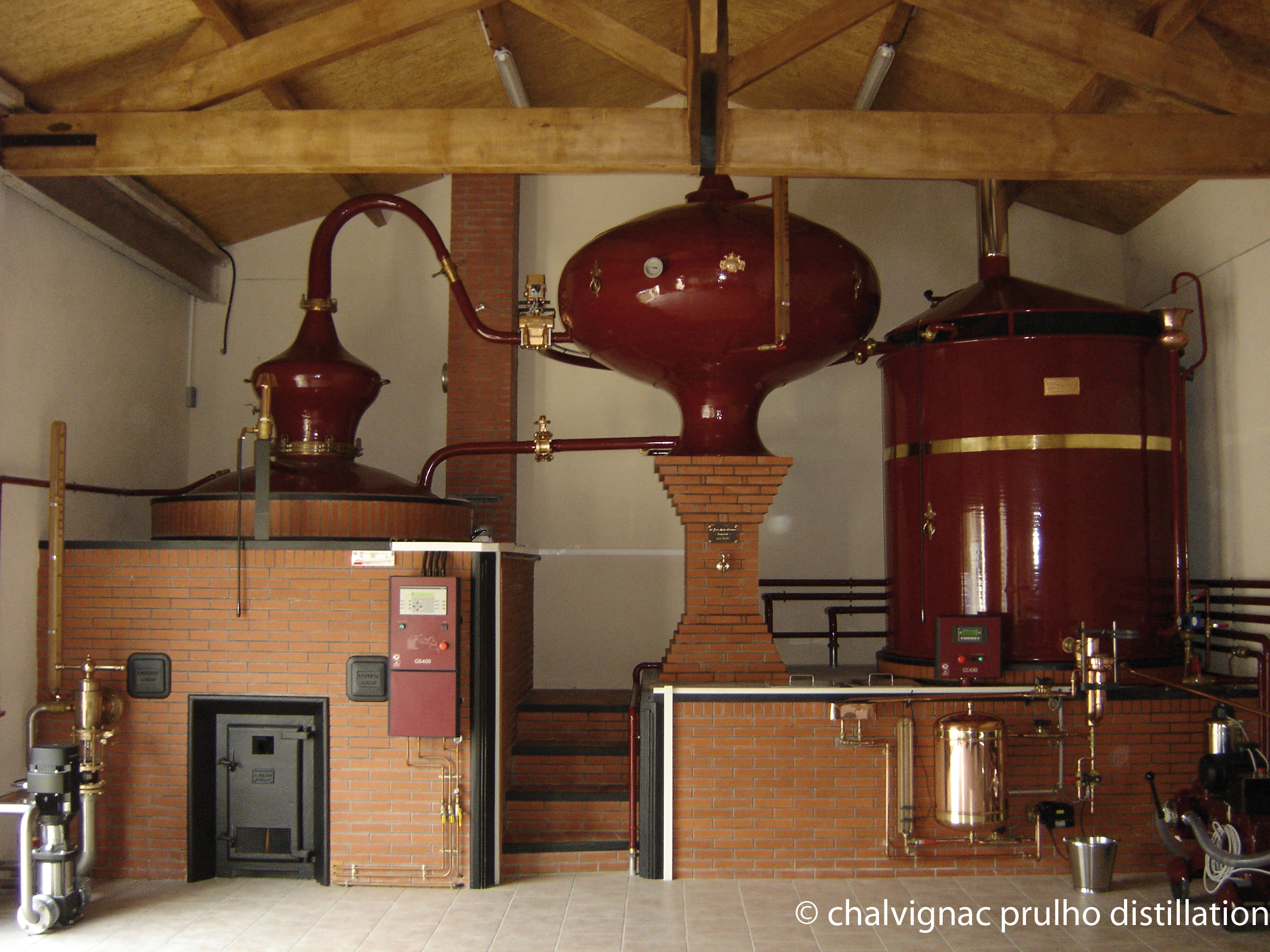
Large "charentais" type alembic for distilling spirits

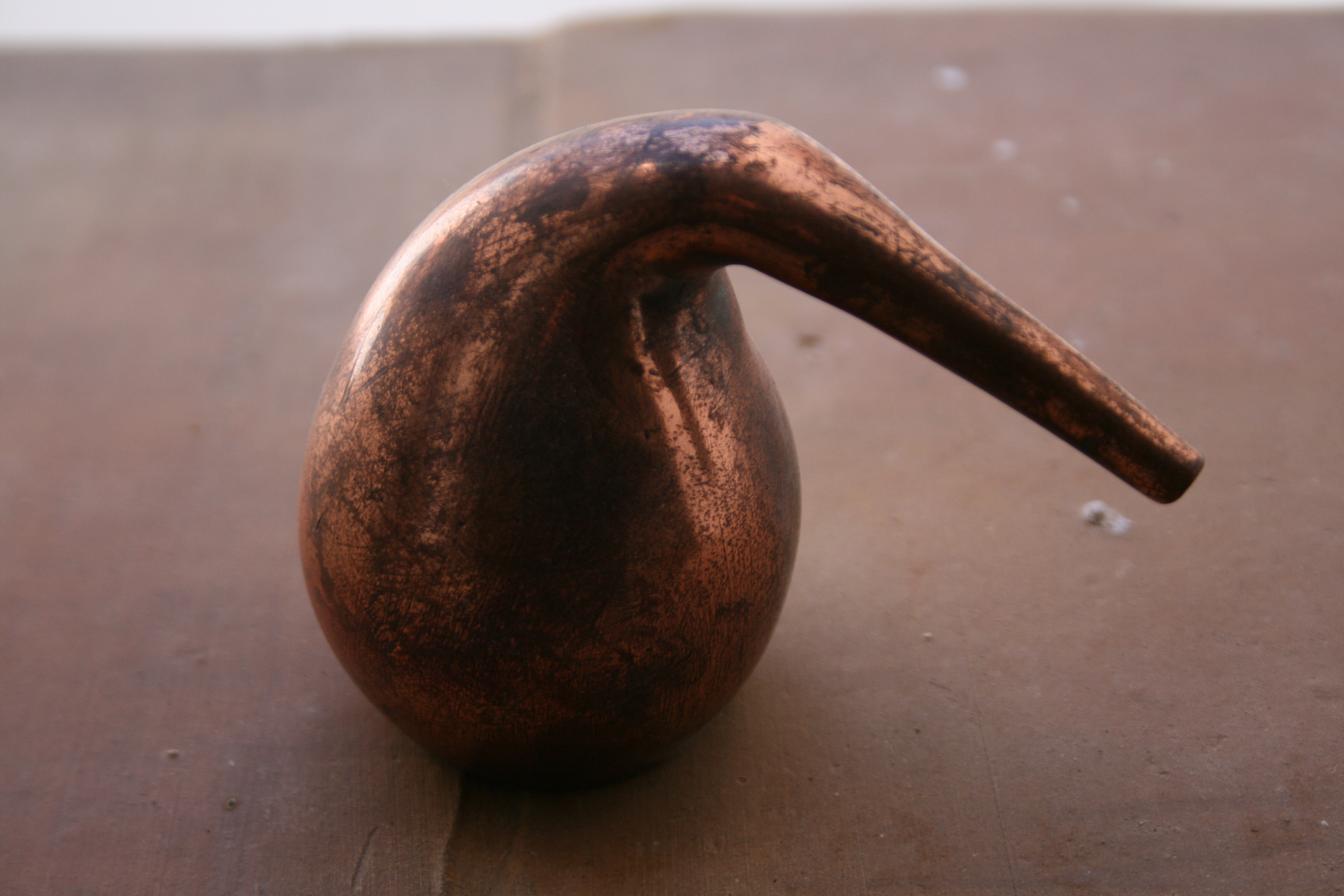
Copper retort

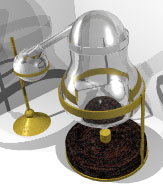
Glass alembic

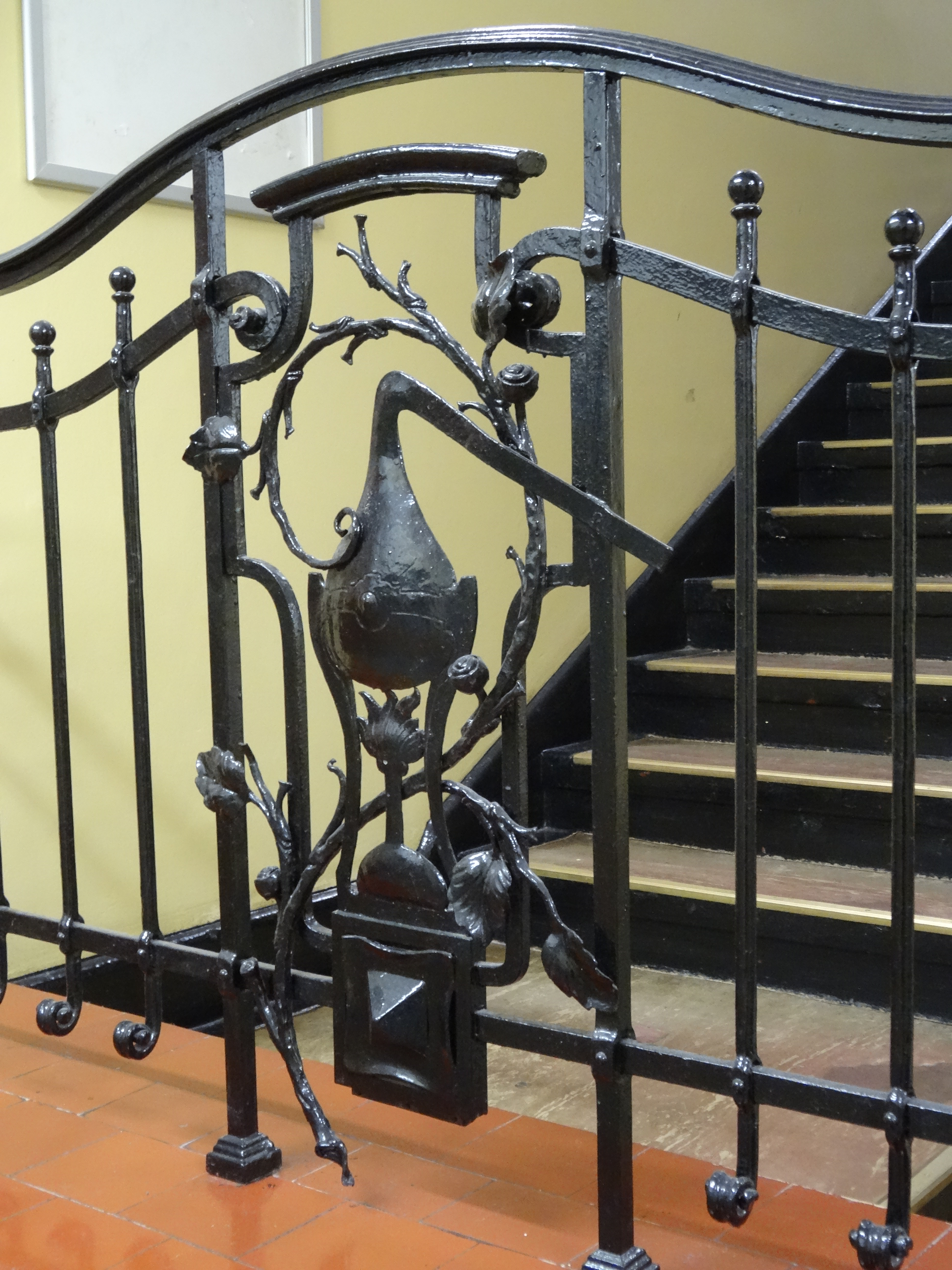
Alembic metalwork in the staircase at the Chemical Faculty of Gdańsk University of Technology, 1904

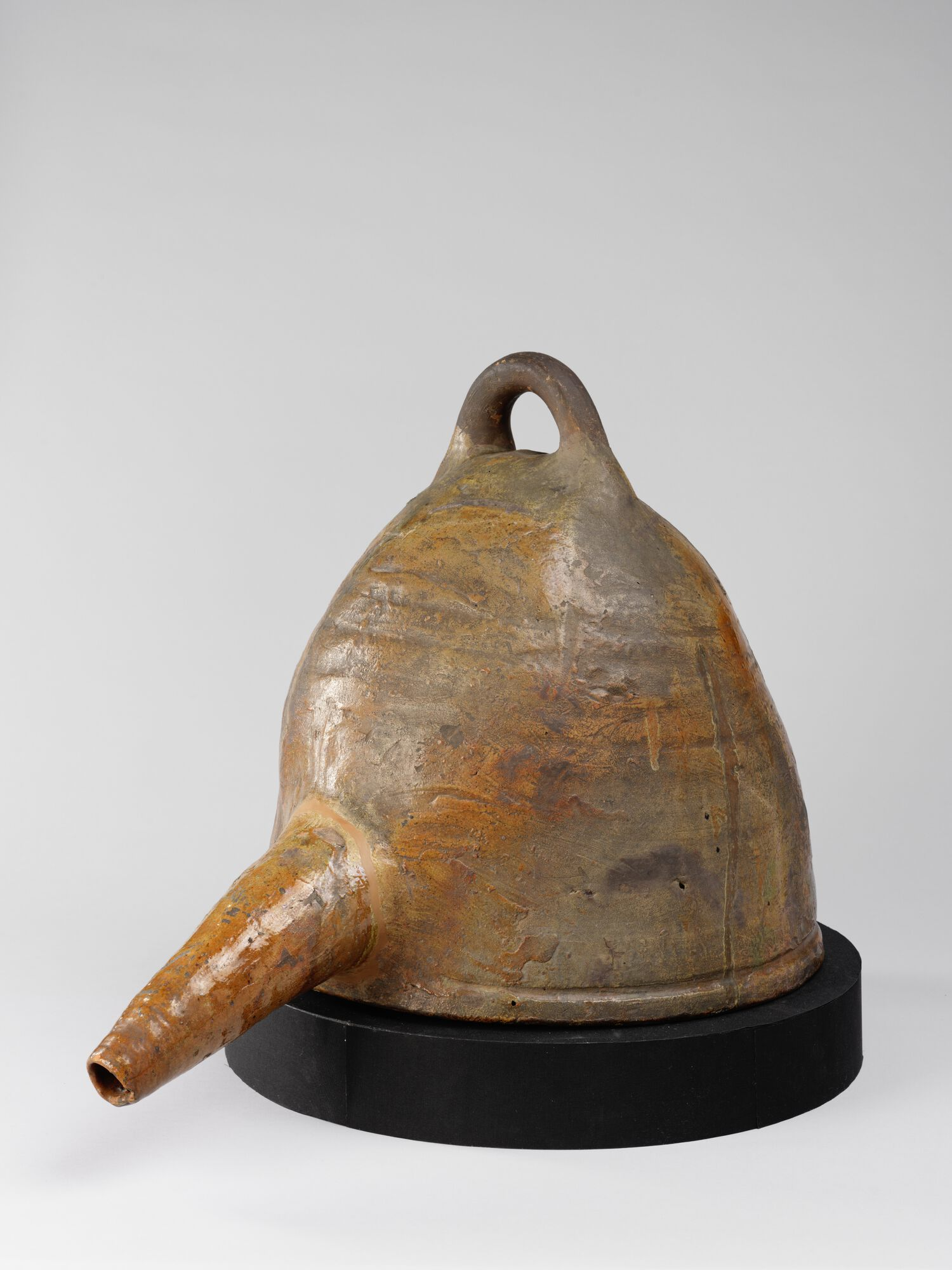
Alembic of the seventeenth century. Collection of the Jenevermuseum Hasselt

== Unicode ==
The Unicode character set specifies three symbols for alembics: the pictogram ⚗ (U+2697), its emoji variation ⚗️ (U+2697U+FE0F), and the ancient alchemical symbol 🝪 (U+1F76A).

== See also ==
- Aludel
