= Zosimos of Panopolis =

Alchemist of the 4th century CE

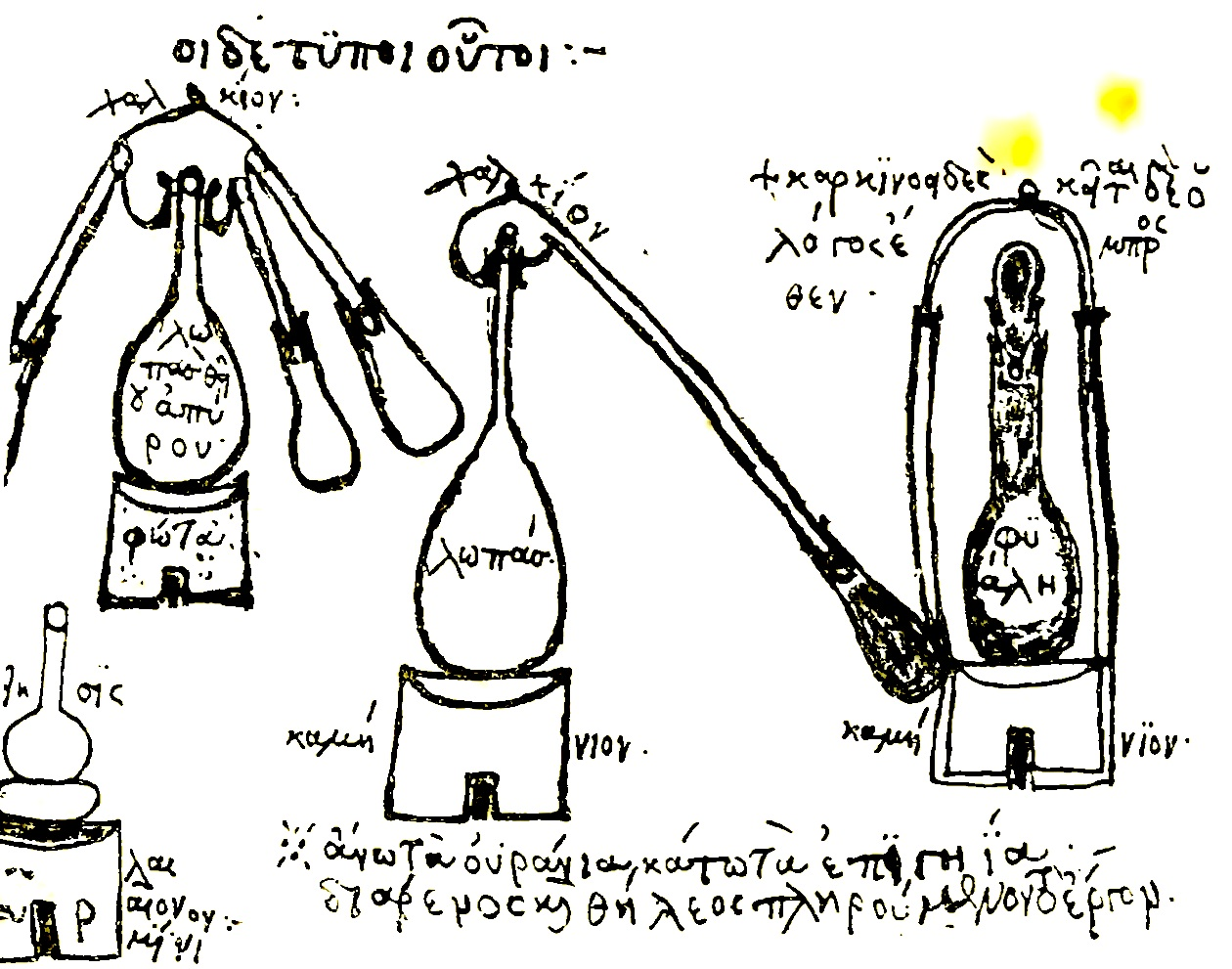
Distillation equipment of Zosimos, from the 15th century Byzantine Greek manuscript Codex Parisinus graecus 2327.

Zosimos of Panopolis (Greek: Ζώσιμος ὁ Πανοπολίτης; also known by the Latin name Zosimus Alchemista, i.e. "Zosimus the Alchemist") was an alchemist and Gnostic mystic. He was born in Panopolis (present day Akhmim, in the south of Roman Egypt), and likely flourished c. 300 AD. He wrote the oldest known books on alchemy, which he called Cheirokmeta, using the Greek word for "things made by hand". Pieces of this work survive in the original Greek language and in translations into Syriac or Arabic. He is one of about 40 authors represented in a compendium of alchemical writings that was probably put together in Constantinople in the 7th or 8th century AD, copies of which exist in manuscripts in Venice and Paris. His fellow Egyptian alchemist Stephen of Alexandria is another.

Arabic translations of texts by Zosimos were discovered in 1995 in a copy of the book Keys of Mercy and Secrets of Wisdom by Ibn Al-Hassan Ibn Ali Al-Tughra'i', a Persian alchemist. The translations were incomplete and seemingly non-verbatim. The famous index of Arabic books, Kitab al-Fihrist by Ibn Al-Nadim, mentions earlier translations of four books by Zosimos, but due to inconsistency in transliteration, these texts were attributed to names "Thosimos", "Dosimos" and "Rimos"; also it is possible that two of them are translations of the same book. Fuat Sezgin, a historian of Islamic science, found 15 manuscripts of Zosimos in six libraries, at Tehran, Cairo, Istanbul, Gotha, Dublin and Rampur. Michèle Mertens analyzed what is known about those manuscripts in her translation of Zosimos, concluding that the Arabic tradition seems extremely rich and promising, and regretting the difficulty of access to these materials until translated editions are available.

== Alchemy ==
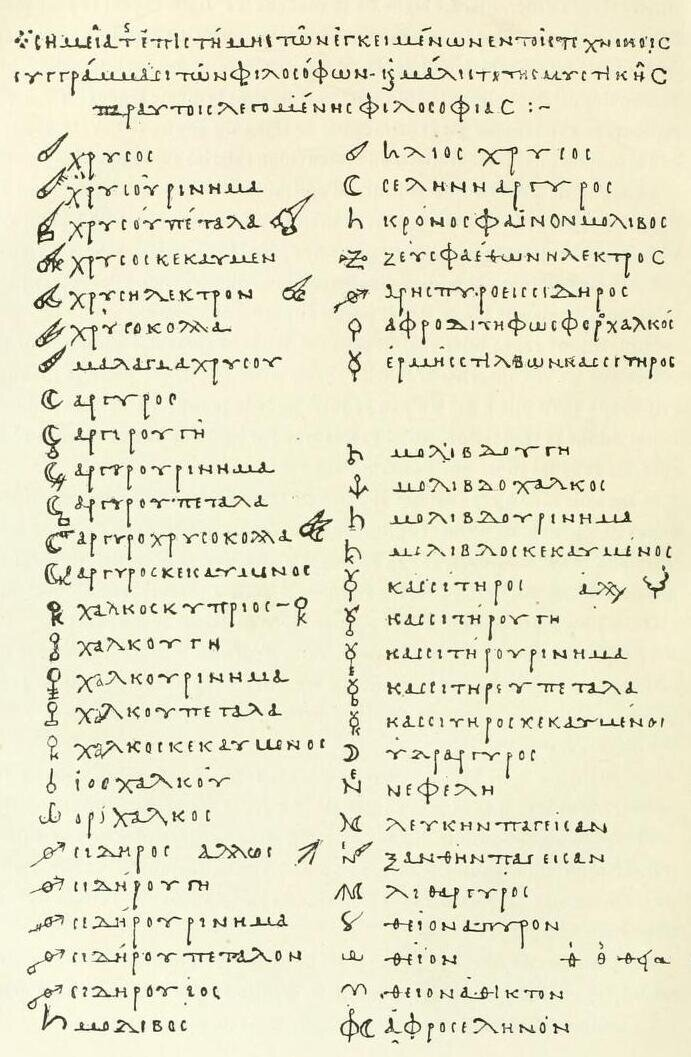
An 1888 reproduction of a Venetian manuscript, from about the year 1100, listing medieval Greek alchemical symbols attributed to Zosimos. Of the planetary metals, ☿ is tin and ♃ electrum; ☾ is silver but ☽ is mercury. See the description of the file on Commons for translation.

Zosimos provided one of the first definitions of alchemy as the study of "the composition of waters, movement, growth, embodying and disembodying, drawing the spirits from bodies and bonding the spirits within bodies."

In general, Zosimos' understanding of alchemy reflects the influence of Hermetic and Gnostic spiritualities. He asserted that the fallen angels taught the arts of metallurgy to the women they married, an idea also recorded in the Book of Enoch and later repeated in the Gnostic Apocryphon of John. In a fragment preserved by Syncellus, Zosimos wrote:

The ancient and divine writings say that the angels became enamoured of women; and, descending, taught them all the works of nature. From them, therefore, is the first tradition, chema, concerning these arts; for they called this book chema and hence the science of chemistry takes its name.

The external processes of metallic transmutation—the transformations of lead and copper into silver and gold were said to always mirror an inner process of purification and redemption. In his work Concerning the true Book of Sophe, the Egyptian, and of the Divine Master of the Hebrews and the Sabaoth Powers, Zosimos wrote:

There are two sciences and two wisdoms, that of the Egyptians and that of the Hebrews, which latter is confirmed by divine justice. The science and wisdom of the most excellent dominate the one and the other. Both originate in olden times. Their origin is without a king, autonomous and immaterial; it is not concerned with material and corruptible bodies, it operates, without submitting to strange influences, supported by prayer and divine grace.

The symbol of chemistry is drawn from the creation by its adepts, who cleanse and save the divine soul bound in the elements, and who free the divine spirit from its mixture with the flesh.

As the sun is, so to speak, a flower of the fire and (simultaneously) the heavenly sun, the right eye of the world, so copper when it blooms—that is when it takes the color of gold, through purification—becomes a terrestrial sun, which is king of the earth, as the sun is king of heaven.

Greek alchemists used what they called ὕδωρ θεῖον, meaning both divine water and sulphurous water. For Zosimos, the alchemical vessel was imagined as a baptismal font, and the tincturing vapours of mercury and sulphur were likened to the purifying waters of baptism, which perfected and redeemed the Gnostic initiate. Zosimos drew upon the Hermetic image of the krater or mixing bowl, a symbol of the divine mind in which the Hermetic initiate was "baptized" and purified in the course of a visionary ascent through the heavens and into the transcendent realms. Similar ideas of a spiritual baptism in the "waters" of the transcendent pleroma are characteristic of the Sethian Gnostic texts unearthed at Nag Hammadi. This image of the alchemical vessel as baptismal font is central to his Visions, discussed below.

== The Book of Pictures ==
This book is divided into 13 chapters, each of them being introduced by a separate image. Two chapters contain a whole series of images, which - according to Zosimos' statements - are meant to be pondered upon in order to better understand his teaching.

The whole text gives a lively dialogue between an alchemical couple: i.e. Zosimos and his female student Theosebeia, revolving about Zosimos' teaching. It reports Theosebeia's complaining about unclear statements of Zosimos as well as Zosimos' anger about her inability to understand his statements. At first sight, the dialogue deals with question upon how to understand statements of alchemical philosophers like Agathodaimon, Democritos, Isis, Moses, Maria, Ostanes, as well as with questions about technical aspects of the alchemical work. But again and again, Zosimos emphasises that he does not talk about the substances and processes as such, as matter, but that they have to be understood symbolically. Zosimos describes the alchemical work by means of a series of images and says to Theosebeia: "What I wrote and told you, and with the picture I made for you with me in it, I gave you what you need to know, and this should be enough for you.". He also states, that these images depict his own innerpsychic process of transformation.

Zosimos' teaching is based on the one hand on his own dream visions, reported in the text. Another source for his teaching was his suffering of a passionate love relationship to Theosebeia, being not allowed to be simply lived out physically. This led him to understand the alchemical work as psychic transformation, enabling the adept to hold and contain the fire of attraction. Correspondingly, Zosimos drew symbolic images of his own death and resurrection as explanation for Theosebeia. Following Abt, the book can be regarded as the earliest historical description of an alchemical work based on a psychic transformation." And it "is a testimony of the painstaking quest to understand not only the problem but also the meaning of attraction, repulsion and ultimate reconciliation between the outer male and female as well as the inner fire and water" a process that "is described [...] with basic substances, mirroring the very elemental, collective character of this process."

In this book, we find fragments of writings from "The Sulfurs", which are ascribed to Zosimos and from his "Letters to Theosebeia". In the course of the dialogue, those fragments seem to be interrupted by Theosebeia's questions and by further explanations. By this, Zosimos' teaching is presented in an easier and more understandable way, as Abt holds.

With regard to content and style, there are similarities between both books, "the Book of Pictures" and the "Book of Keys" (see there).

Up to now, only one single Arabic manuscript of the "Book of Pictures" is extant. In the fourth part of the "Book of the Rank of the Sage (Rutbat al-Ḥakīm) its author Maslama al-Qurțubī (formerly wrongly assigned to Maslama al-Magriti) quotes extensively from the "Book of Pictures". He is the first author quoting it, but using another Greek original than the one published in 2015 than the version published 2015 (CALA III, by Th. Abt) and has influenced several alchemists like the early Arabic alchemist Ibn Umail, the "Kitab al-Habib" (Book of the Friend/Lover; including a dialogue between a so-called Rusam and Theosebeia) and the alchemist "Hermes of Dendera", author of "Risalat as-Sirr" (Epistle of the Secret; including a similar dialogue between Hermes Budasir und Amnutasiya). Other traits of Latin symbolic alchemy, like the traditional division of the work in 12 parts or the representation of inner and outer relationship between adept and soror mystica (e.g. in "Rosarium Philosophorum" and in "Mutus Liber") can be traced back to this book and seem to be influcend by it. Fragments of the text of the "Book of Pictures" can be found in "Rosarium Philosophorum" and "Artis Auriferae". (e.g. titled "Tractatus Rosini ad Euticiam" (="Treatise of Rosinus to Euticia").

The Book of Pictures itself is influenced by Ancient Egyptian thinking, its iconography showing relations to pharaonic iconography and having motifs paralleling Egyptian books of the underworld like Amduat, which was known until Greek-Roman times. Regarding the inner and outer relationship between man and woman or between psychic male and female aspects, the "Book of Pictures" forms a cultural bridge between pharaonic thoughts and European medieval alchemy.

== The Book of the Keys of the Work ==
This book is written as commentary in 10 chapters on "the Book of the 10 Keys", a work ascribed to Democritus (Democritus of Abdera or Pseudo-Democritus). As at the beginning of the book (fol. 41a.3-4) is written, this commentary was Zosimos' last text written for Theosebeia. According to Abt, the book gives an essence of Zosimos' teachings, as the preamble says, that the book is so clear and understandable, that after its reading, Theosebeia "understood the [alchemical] work".

There are many parallels between the "Book of the Keys of the Work" and "The Book of Pictures" in terms of subject and style: Both books are written "to my lady" and mainly "in dialogue form, [... have] the same emphasis on the fact that there is just one alchemical operation [...], the alchemical work is one and emphasises the same central role for Democritus, 'the head of the sages of his time' [...]. The operation in both books centres on a composition of vapours [...]. It has the same essential feature of extracting the subtle with 'gentleness' [...] from all four natures, the mixture of like with like, and the need to bind the fugitive spirit. They have analogies in common, for example that of copper with the human being. As in the "Book of Pictures", one can trace motives and symbols of Zosimos' teachings that go back to the worldview of pharaonic Egypt. Integrating these motives allows a better understanding of the text.

== Surviving works ==
- Authentic Memoirs
- The Book of the Keys of the Work (Kitāb Mafātīḥ aṣ-ṣan'a)
- The Book of Pictures (Muṣḥaf aṣ-ṣuwar)
- Concerning the true Book of Sophe, the Egyptian, and of the Divine Master of the Hebrews and the Sabaoth Powers (French translation)
- The Final Quittance (French translation)
- Letters to Theosebeia
- On the Evaporation of the Divine Water that fixes Mercury (French translation )
- On the Letter Omega (English excerpt translated by G.R.S. Mead; French translation)
- The Sulfurs
- Treatise on Instruments and Furnaces (French translation)
- The Visions of Zosimos (English translation)

The complete (as of 1888) "Œuvres de Zosime" were published in French by M. Berthelot in Les alchimistes grecs. English translations remain elusive; English translations of the Arabic The Book of the Keys of the Work (Kitāb Mafātīḥ aṣ-ṣan'a) and The Book of Pictures (Muṣḥaf aṣ-ṣuwar) have been published by Th. Abt and W. Madelung.

== In popular culture ==
The three visions of Zosimos describe him meeting a priest named Ion, who is mutilated and rebuilt, symbolising the alchemical process. This has inspired works of the SCP Foundation, most notably those of the Sarkicism genre.

== See also ==
- Alchemy and chemistry in medieval Islam
- Mary the Jewess

== Bibliography ==
=== Fragments ===
- Berthelot, Marcelin (1888). Collection des Anciens Alchimistes Grecs (in French). Paris: Steinheil. Vol. I (introduction) p. 119, 127—174, 209, 250; vol. II (Greek text) p. 28, 117—120; Vol. III (trans.) p. 117—242.
- H. D. Saffrey & Zosime de Panopolis (trans. M. Mertens) (1995). Les alchimistes grecs, vol. IV.1: Mémoires authentiques (in French). Les Belles-Lettres. pp. CLXXIII–348. ISBN 2-251-00448-3. p. 1—49: I = Sur la lettre oméga; V = Sur l'eau divine; VI = Diagramme (ouroboros); VII = Sur les appareils et fourneaux

=== Arabic works ===
- Zosimos, of Panapolis (2007). Abt, Theodor; Warburton, David (eds.). The Book of Pictures. Mushaf as-suwar by Zosimos of Panapolis. Facsimile edition. Edited by W. Madelung with an introduction by Theodor Abt. Corpus Alchemicum Arabicum (CALA) II.1. Zurich: Living Human Heritage Publications.
- Zosimos, of Panapolis (2011). Abt, Theodor (ed.). The Book of Pictures. Mushaf as-suwar by Zosimos of Panapolis. Edited with an introduction by Theodor Abt. Translated by Salwa Fuad and Theodor Abt. Corpus Alchemicum Arabicum (CALA) II.2. Zurich: Living Human Heritage Publications. ISBN 978-3-9522608-7-6.
- Zosimos, of Panapolis (2016). Abt, Theodor (ed.). The Book of the Keys of the Work. Kitāb Mafātīh aṣ-ṣan'a by Zosimos of Panopolis. Arabic Facsimile and English Translation. Edited with an Introduction by Theodor Abt. Translated by Salwa Fuad and Theodor Abt. Corpus Alchemicum Arabicum (CALA) III. Zurich: Living Human Heritage Publications. ISBN 978-3-9523880-6-8.

=== Studies ===
- Abt, Theodor (2011). "Introduction to the Facsimile Edition, Introduction to the Translation," in: Zosimos, of Panapolis (2011). Abt, Theodor (ed.). The Book of Pictures. Muṣḥaf aṣ-ṣuwar by Zosimos of Panapolis. Edited with an introduction by Theodor Abt. Translated by Salwa Fuad and Theodor Abt. Corpus Alchemicum Arabicum (CALA) II.2. Zurich: Living Human Heritage Publications. ISBN 978-3-9522608-7-6. p. 17-139.
- Abt, Theodor (2016): "Introduction", in: Zosimos, of Panapolis (2016). Abt, Theodor (ed.). The Book of the Keys of the Work. Kitāb Mafātīh aṣ-ṣan'a by Zosimos of Panopolis. Arabic Facsimile and English Translation. Edited with an Introduction by Theodor Abt. Translated by Salwa Fuad and Theodor Abt. Corpus Alchemicum Arabicum (CALA) III. Zurich: Living Human Heritage Publications. ISBN 978-3-9523880-6-8. p. 11-53.
- Beretta, Marco, ed. (2022). A Cultural History Of Chemistry. Volume 1: In Antiquity. London: Bloomsbury. doi:10.5040/9781474203746. ISBN 978-1-4742-9453-9.
- Berthelot, Marcelin (1885). Les Origines de l'alchimie (in French). Paris: Steinheil. pp. 177–187.
- Berthelot, Marcelin (1888). Collection des Anciens Alchimistes Grecs (in French). Paris: Steinheil. Vol. I (introduction) p. 119, 127—174, 209, 250.
- Berthelot, Marcelin (1893). La Chimie au Moyen Âge (in French). Paris: Steinheil. Vol. II, p. 203—266; Vol. III, p. 28, 30, 41.
- Grimes, Shannon (2018). Becoming Gold: Zosimos of Panopolis and the Alchemical Arts in Roman Egypt. Auckland: Rubedo Press. ISBN 9780473407766.
- Lindsay, Jack (1970). The Origins of Alchemy in Graeco-Roman Egypt. Barnes & Noble. ISBN 0-389-01006-5.
- Jackson, A. H. (1978). Zosimos of Panopolis. On the letter Omega. Missoula (Montana).
- Knipe, Sergio, "Sacrifice and self-transformation in the alchemical writings of Zosimus of Panopolis," in Christopher Kelly, Richard Flower, Michael Stuart Williams (eds), Unclassical Traditions. Vol. II: Perspectives from East and West in Late Antiquity (Cambridge, Cambridge University Press, 2011) (Cambridge Classical Journal, Supplemental Volume 35), 59-69.
- Martelli, Matteo (2017). "Alchemy, Medicine and Religion: Zosimus of Panopolis and the Egyptian Priests". Religion in the Roman Empire. 3 (2): 202–220. doi:10.1628/219944617X15008820103379.
