= Aurora consurgens =

15th century alchemical treatise

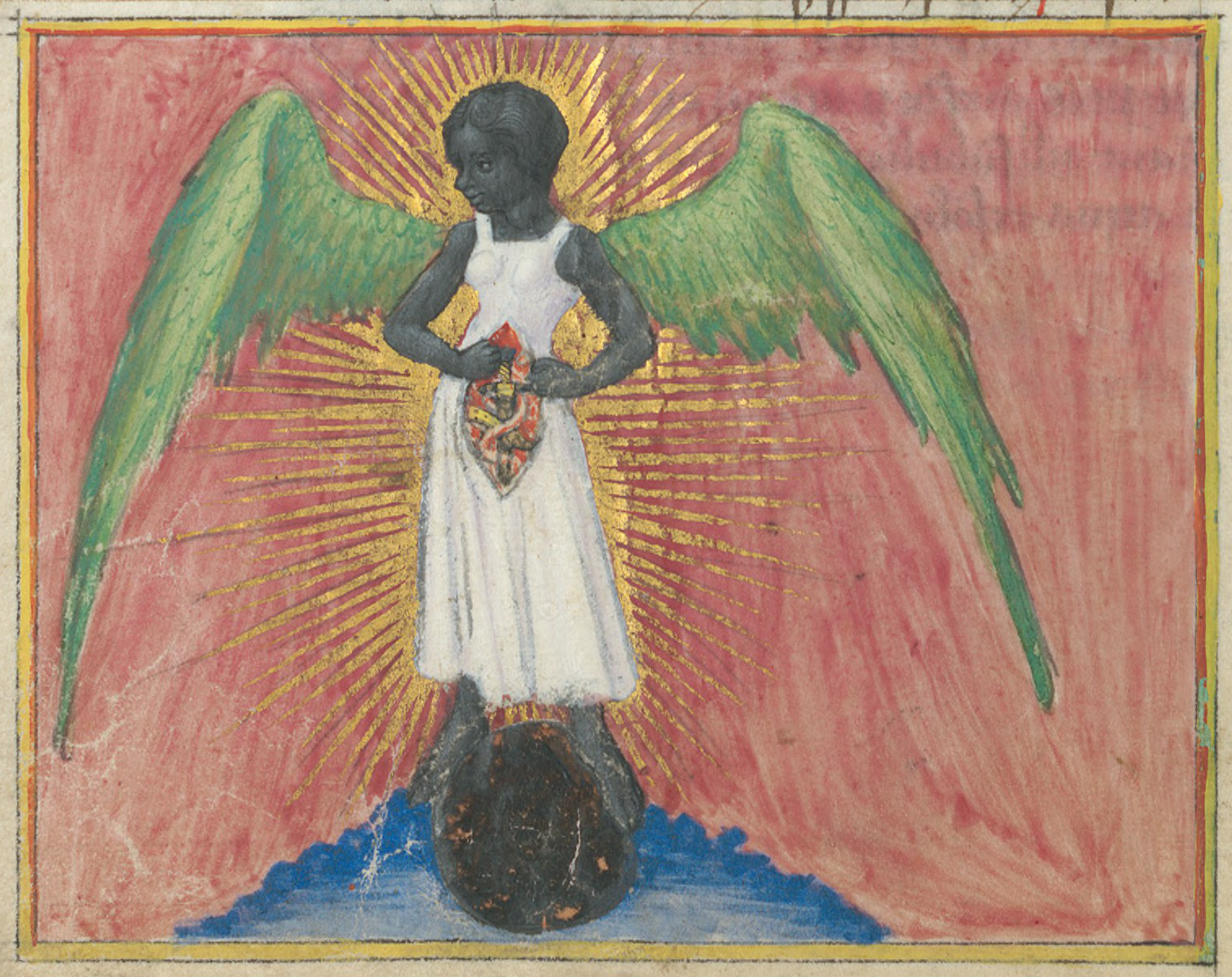
Illustration of an angel found in Aurora consurgens

The Aurora consurgens is an alchemical treatise of the 15th century famous for the rich illuminations that accompany it in some manuscripts. While in the last century, the text has been more commonly referred to as "Pseudo-Aquinas", there are as well arguments in favour of Thomas Aquinas, to whom it has originally been attributed in some manuscripts. The translated title from Latin into English is "Rising dawn."

== Authorship ==
The argument against the authorship of Thomas Aquinas is that the style of Aurora consurgens does not correspond to that of Thomas Aquinas (except in the Fourth Parable, which in style and content is similar to the "Expositio" in "Symbolum Apostolorum", which is an oral lecture of Thomas of Aquinas). According to von Franz the following arguments support the hypothesis of Thomas Aquinas being the author of Aurora Consurgens: Its author knows both the Bible and liturgy intimately, he quotes rather little of classical alchemical texts and mentions neither chemical recipes nor technical instructions, which indicates a clergyman to be its author. His praising of the poor is typical for a Dominican or a Franciscan. The passionate style of being gripped could result from an intrusion of the unconscious, which – as psychological experience tells - might have compensated a rather intellectual consciousness dominated by logic. The biography of Thomas Aquinas fits this, as, before his death, Thomas Aquinas is said to have had a disturbing vision, the content of which is not authenticated. But he is said to have interpreted the Song of Songs on his deathbed. Thus, this treatise might well represent his last seminar or his last words.

== Overview ==
Aurora consurgens is a commentary on the Latin translation of Silvery Waters by Senior Zadith (Ibn Umayl). It also refers to the Song of Songs, especially in its last (7th) parable (de confabulatione dilecti cum dilecta), which draws closely on it, in main parts paraphrasing it. Unusual for a work of this type, the text is accompanied by about thirty-seven fine miniatures in watercolour. The illustrations are representations of alchemical symbols depicted in human or animal form. For example, mercury is depicted as a serpent, gold as the sun and silver as the moon. These illustrations incorporate some of the earliest Greek alchemical symbols known, found in the Authentic Memoirs of Zosimos of Panopolis.

== Illuminations ==
The visuals found in Aurora consurgens are regarded by B. Obrist as alchemical metaphors that relate to human and animal procreation, procedures like calcination and putrefaction and other motifs. The manuscript also contains pictorial metaphors combined with glass vessels which depict the stages of the alchemical art of transformation. There are other metaphors found throughout the manuscript that are used in conjunction to create chains of metaphors. Some examples of this include cosmological and philosophical principles of the concepts like "two are one" and "nature vanquishes nature". Another illustration combines the motifs of Mercury decapitating the sun and the moon with a vase filled with silver and gold flowers.

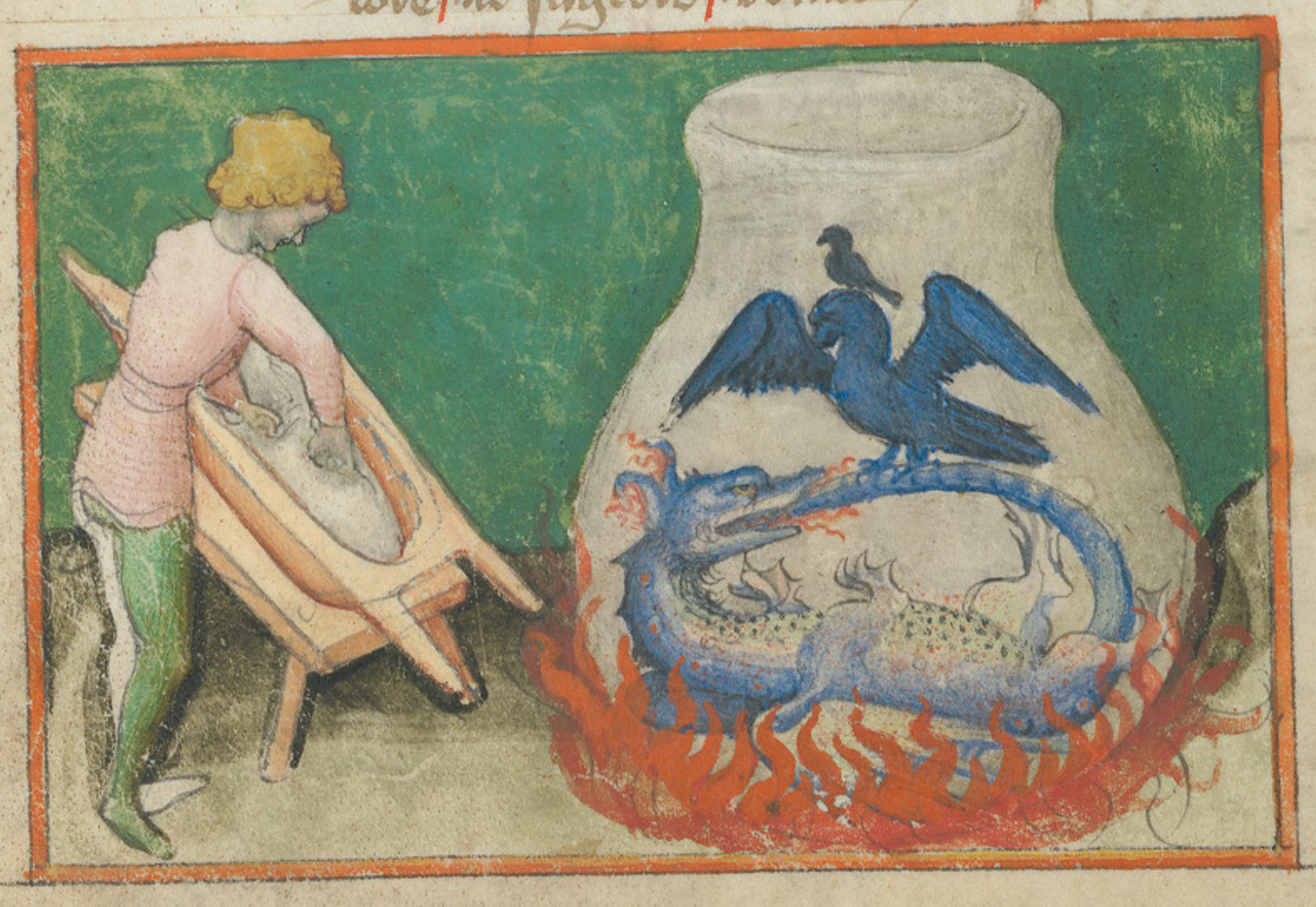
Depiction of the Ouroboros found in Aurora consurgens

Another depicts two birds holding each other in a way that forms a circle which also symbolises "two in one". This exemplifies the cosmic principle of unity, shown metaphorically as the dragon biting its tail. The ouroboros biting its tail has been stylised into a medallion of three concentric circles with inscriptions referring to the unity of everything and two natures attracting and dominating each other. It is associated with the symbols of the sun, moon, mercury, and sulfur. Another example includes the eagle and the dragon, which represent mercury as a volatile and as a solidified substance, respectively. Further, the unification of the opposite principles female/male, passive/active, cold/hot, moist/dry finds expression in the coupling of the sun and the moon, a cosmological motif of central importance since it symbolizes the generation of all things.

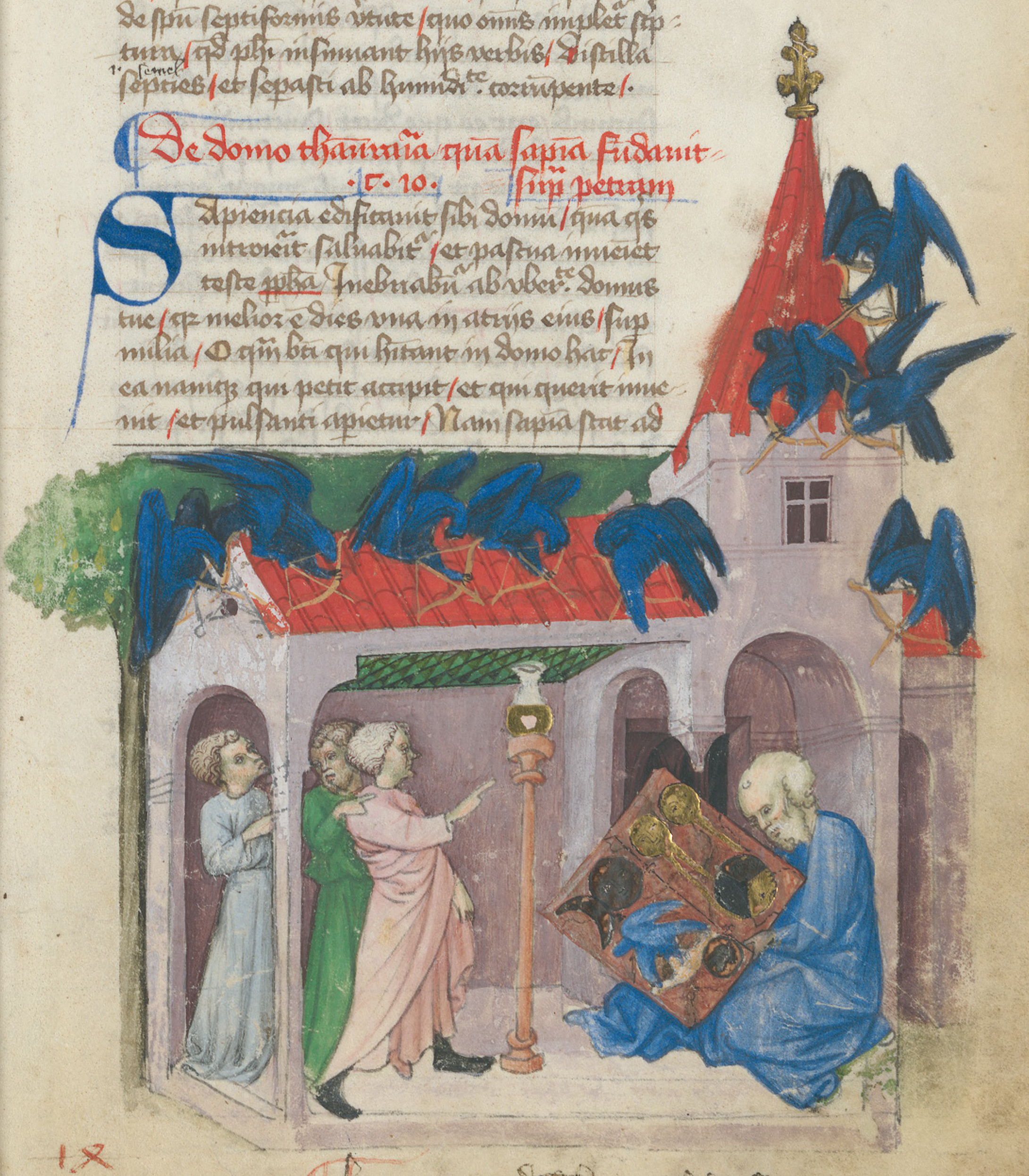
Sage with a tablet within a church-like building (1420/30), the "house of wisdom", depicted in Aurora Consurgens (Codex Rhenoviensis 172, Rheinau, fol. 7r).

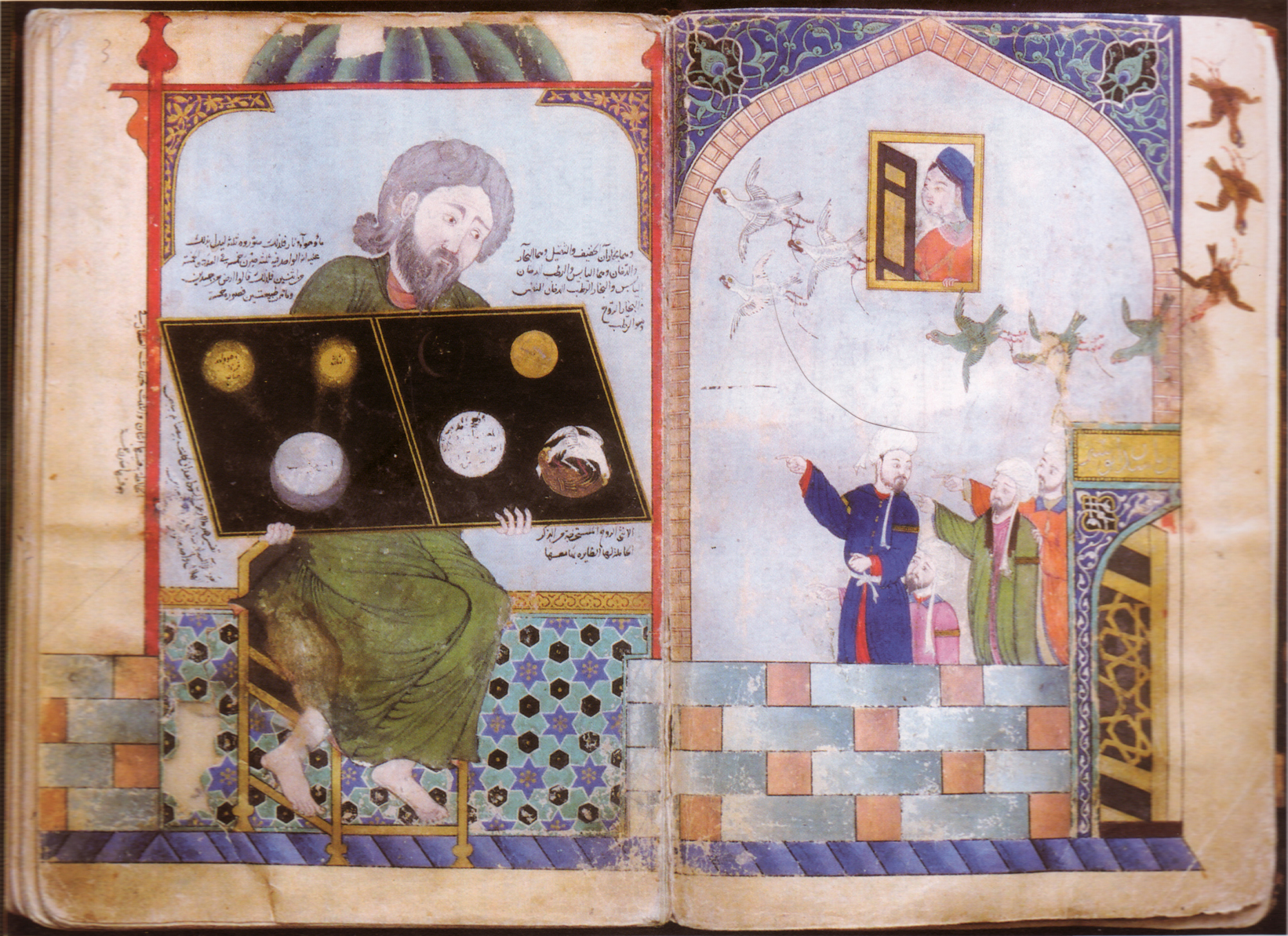
Illustration from a transcript (608H/1211) of Muḥammad ibn Umayl al-Tamimi's book Al-mā' al-waraqī (The Silvery Water), also called Senioris Zadith tabula chymica, depicting his Great Vision.

There are many common features between the illustration of Aurora Consurgens (Cod. Rhenov. fol. 7r) and that of Muḥammad Ibn Umails The Silvery Water. As Th. Abt suggests, the depiction of aurora is very likely to be an assimilated transmission of the depiction of Ibn Umails great alchemical vision in his Arabic The Silvery Water. Ibn Umail understood the symbolic pictograms on the tablet to represent the quintessence of alchemical knowledge. Both illustrations show a wise old man, sitting within a sanctuary, which has two rooms, and holding a tablet with symbolic pictograms. As well, three people pointing towards his direction and nine birds carrying weapons are depicted. Whereas the Arabic original shows a clearer distinction of two similar sized rooms, meant to represent an Egyptian temple, the Latin one shows a kind of church with two rooms of different size. Further, the Arabic original gives different coloured birds carrying swords instead of blue birds with bows, a woman in a window instead of a glass bottle on top of a pole, etc. This illustration may have inspired a rather similar depiction in Theatrum Chemicum (Basle, 1660) and in J.J. Mangets Bibliotheca Chemica (Geneva, 1702).

== Copies of Aurora consurgens ==
- Zürich, Zentralbibliothek MS. Rhenoviensis 172
- Glasgow, University Library MS. Ferguson 6
- Leiden, Universiteitsbibliotheek, MS. Vossiani Chymici F. 29
- Paris, Bibliothèque nationale de France, MS. Parisinus Latinus 14006
- Prague, Univerzitní knihovna, MS. VI. Fd. 26
- Prague, Metropolitan Chapter, MS. 1663. O. LXXIX
- Berlin, Staatsbibliothek Preußischer Kulturbesitz, MS. Germ. qu. 848

=== Major differences ===
In Glasgow, Sp. Coll. Ferguson MS 6 (f. 220v), a couple depicted performing intercourse are hidden under a sheet and a blue bedspread. Their child is shown sleeping in a small rocking cradle, along with a young servant boy standing at the foot of the bed. At the Staatsbibliothek in Berlin MS Ger. Quatro. 848 (f. 30v), the related illustration has been defaced by being covered with a brown wash even though they appear to be covered to their waists by bed clothes. The child and young servant boy at the end of the bed were not damaged. This implies that the defacer was likely offended by the sexual nature of the scene.

Another illustration in the Berlin manuscript (f. 18r), in which the couple makes love on a bed in a forest surrounded by a wattle fence, has also been defaced with wash, although not to the same degree as the image of the couple in bed. (f. 30v). These defacements suggest that some readers of alchemical texts were offended by visualizations of sexual analogies.

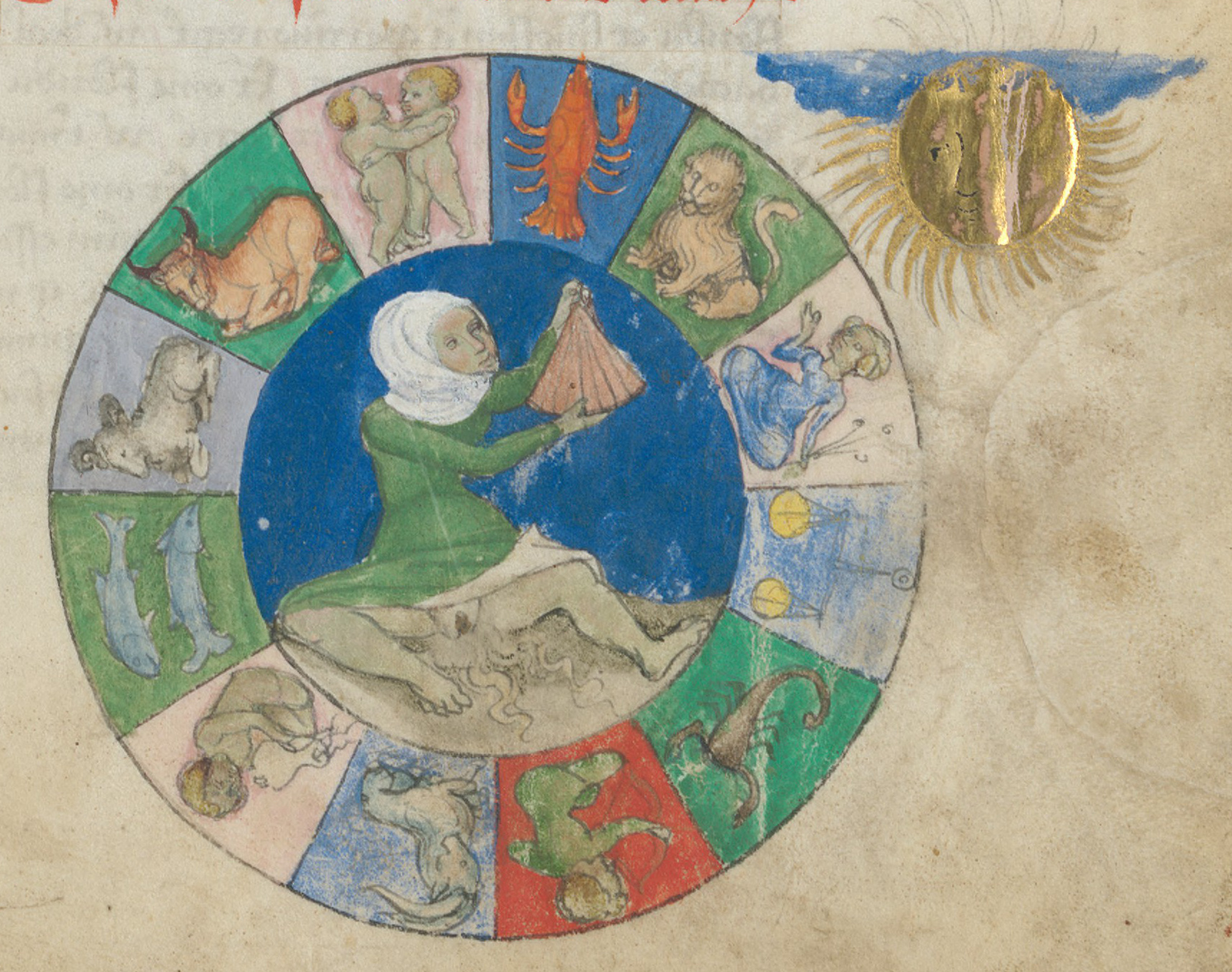
Depiction of the zodiac menstrual cycle found in Aurora consurgens

The explicitness of sexual details also varies from text to text.

In an illustration from Zürich Zentralbibliothek MS Rh. 172 (f. 11r), a menstruating woman bleeds profusely within a zodiac circle to illustrate her monthly cycle and the creation of menstruation and its use within the body. In the Spruch der Philosophien, Glasgow's Sp. Coll. Ferguson MS 6 (Pl. 3), the artist concealed her genitals under her skirt and reduced the blood flow, which obscures the meaning of the menstrual cloths she is holding up.

== Impact ==
The representation of sexuality within these images also provides many points of comparison. The lovemaking of King and Queen in the Rosarium philosophorum series is derived from scenes in the Aurora consurgens and the Donum Dei series.

Many patrons were interested in aesthetic and poetic contemplation and also in gaining the knowledge to perform alchemy. Aurora consurgens addresses all of the factors, implying it is directed to aristocratic and noble patrons. Some of these patrons include the margrave of Brandenburg and Barbara of Cilli, the wife of the emperor Sigismund.

Peter Gabriel drew inspiration from the work for a number of his songs including Down The Dolce Vita, On The Air, and Red Rain.

== Gallery ==
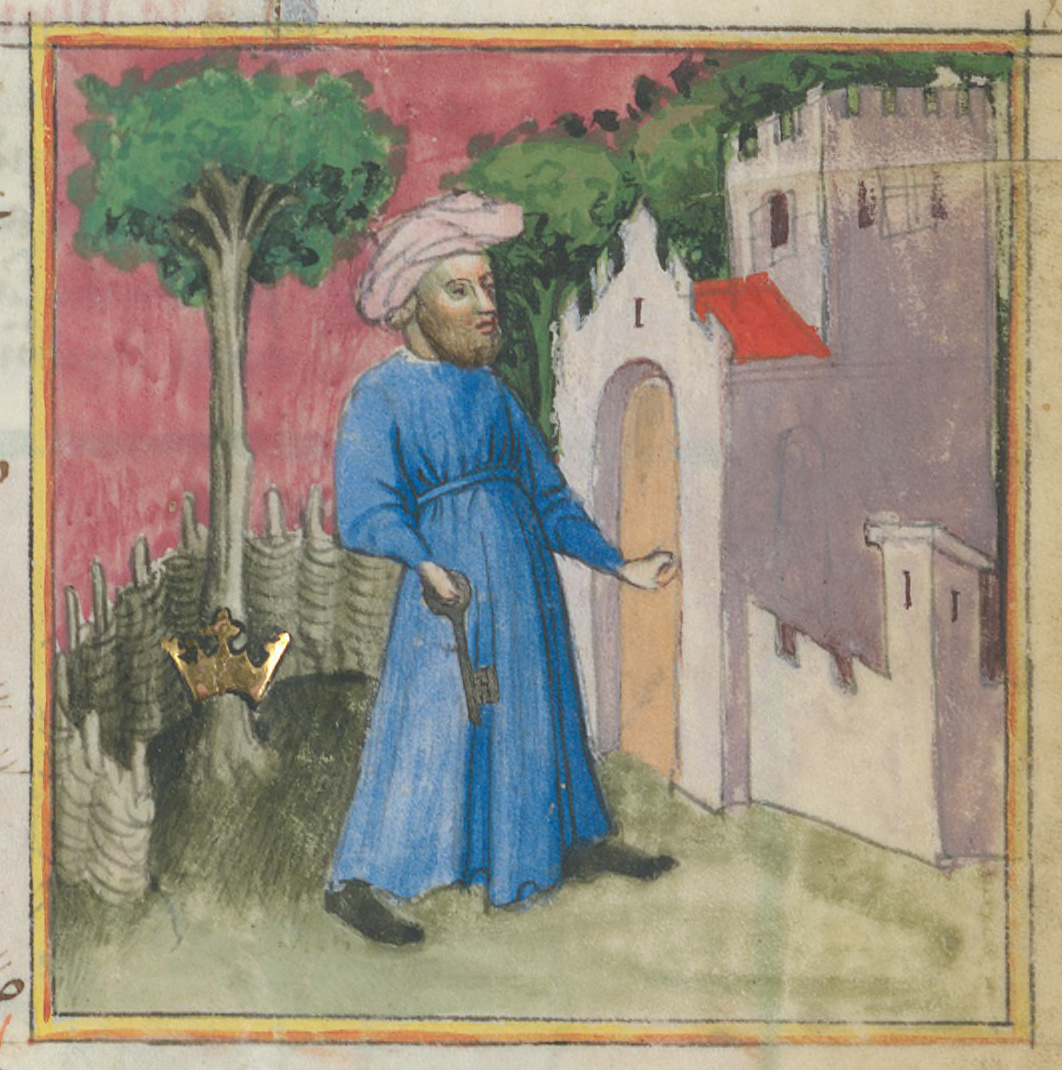
Senior Zadith carries the Key that opens The Treasure House of Wisdom.

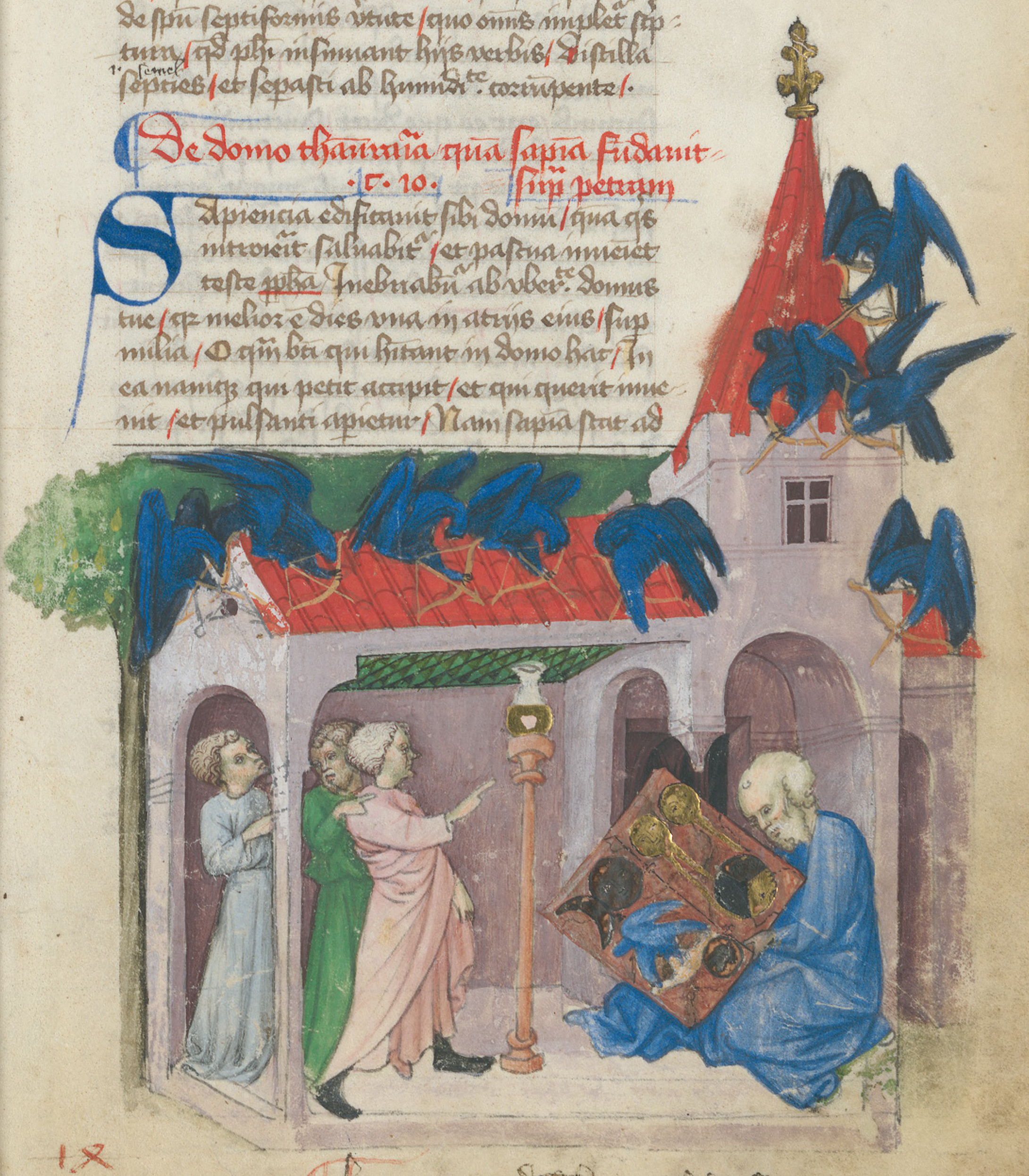
A statue of an ancient sage holds the tablet of wisdom in a temple as described in The Silvery Water

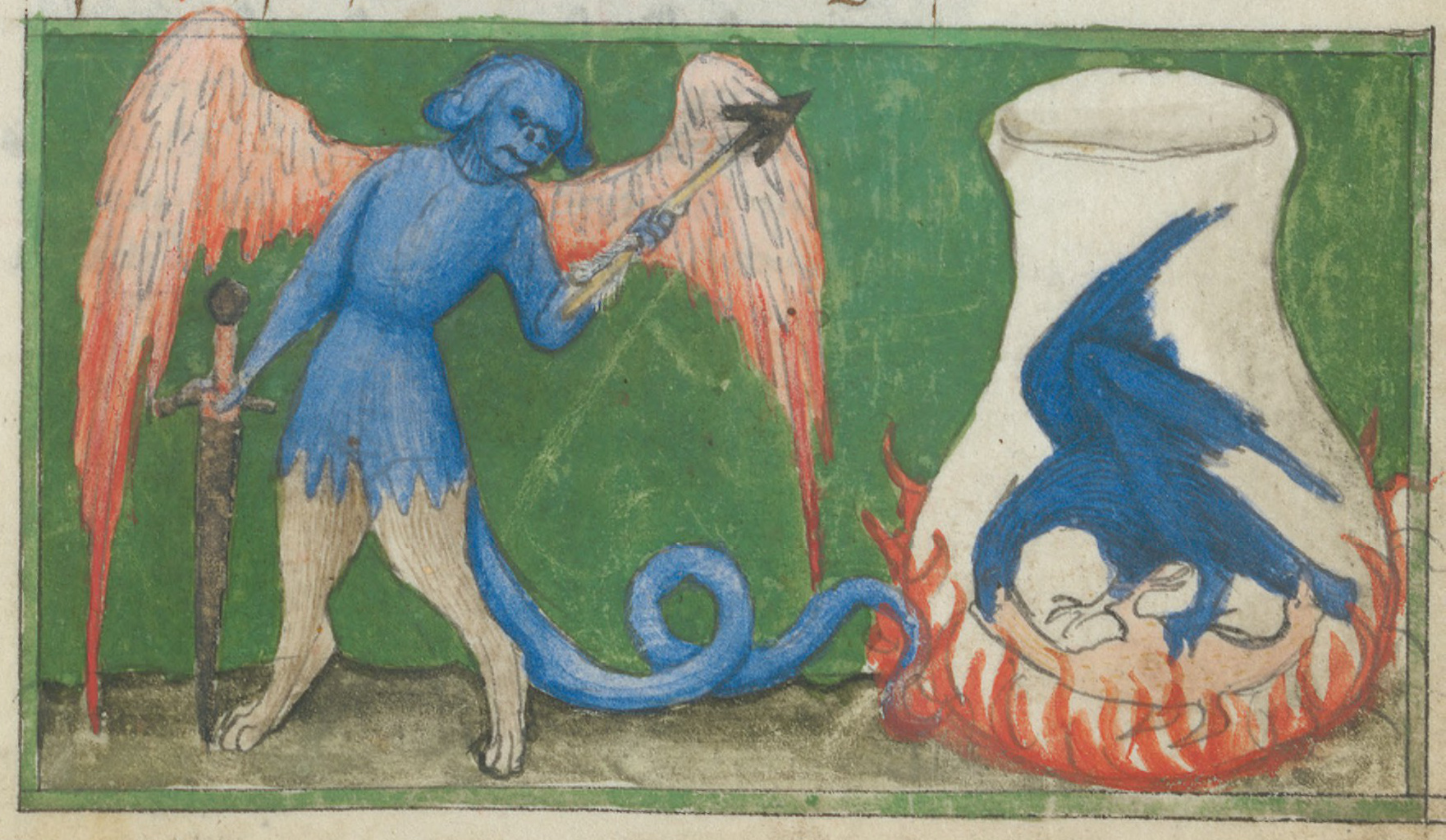
Chimera in athanor

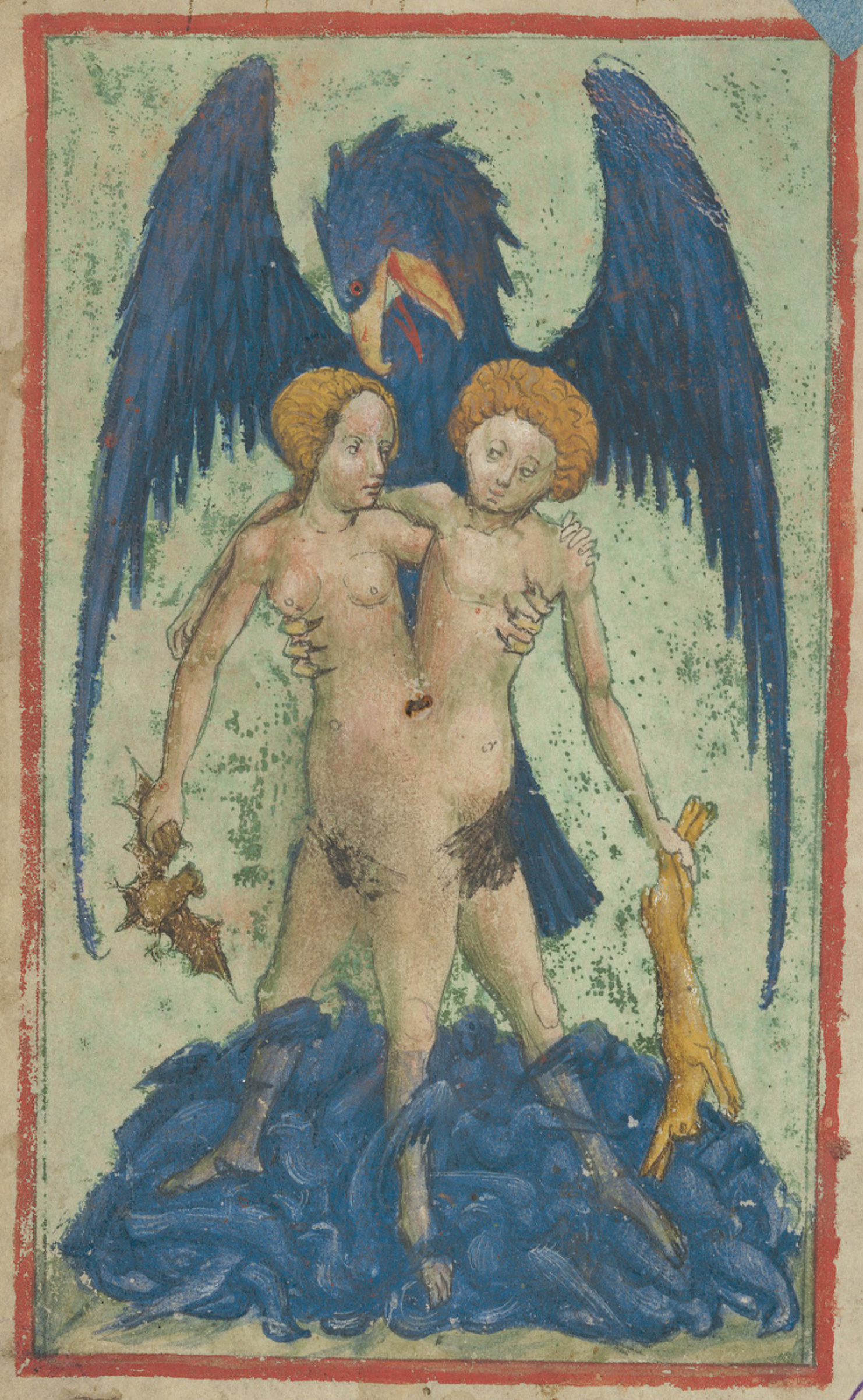
Conjoined opposites

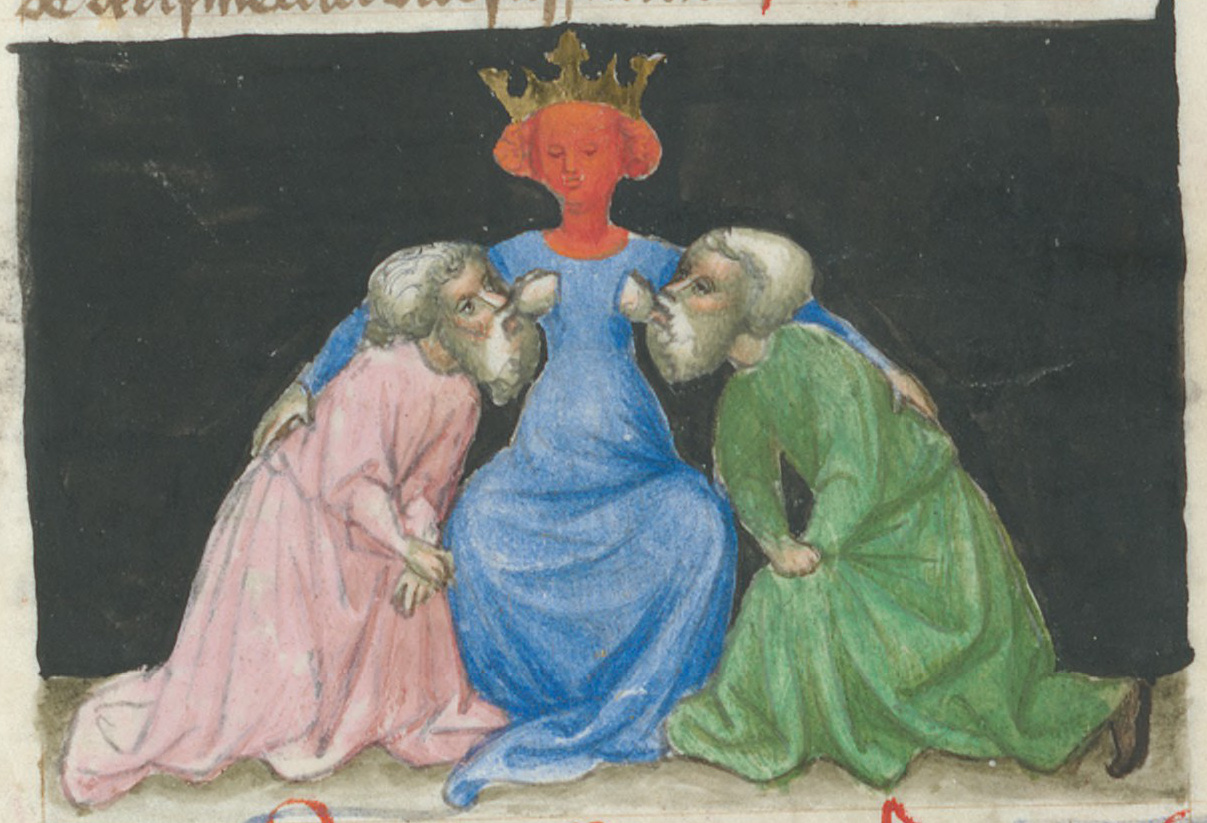
Breastfeeding of opposites

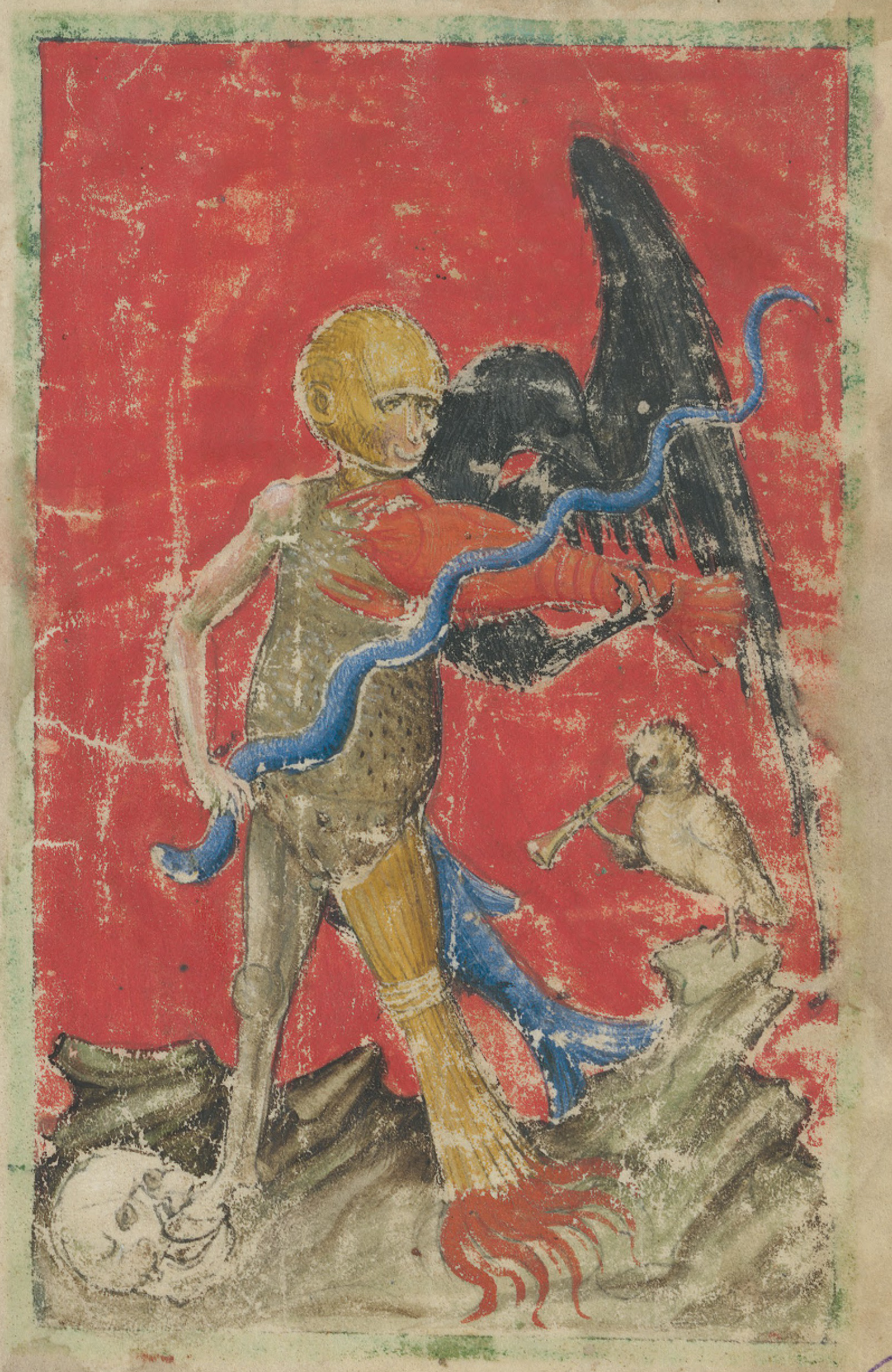
Music of death

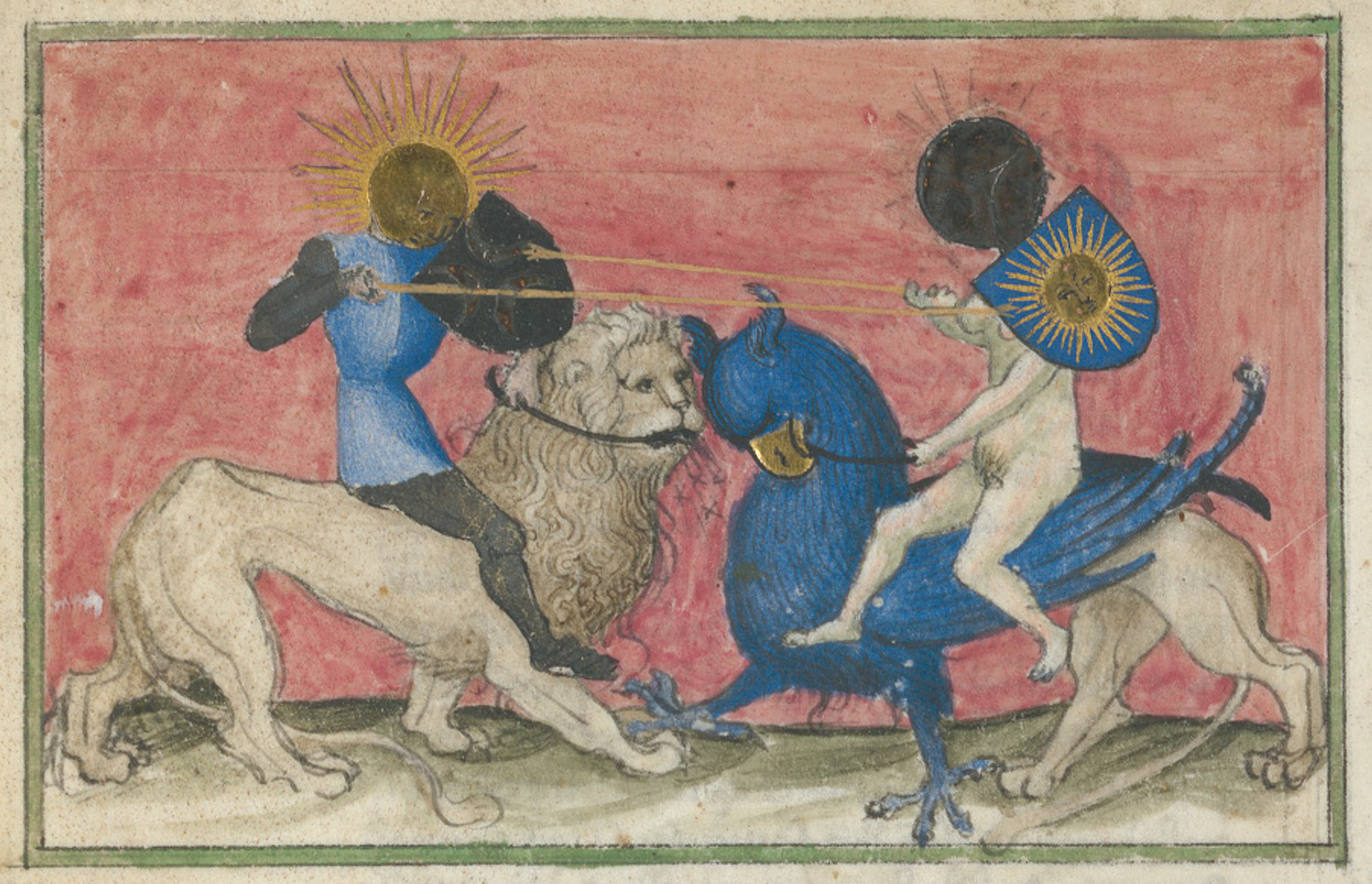
Sun and moon jousting
