= Aludel =

Subliming pot used in alchemy

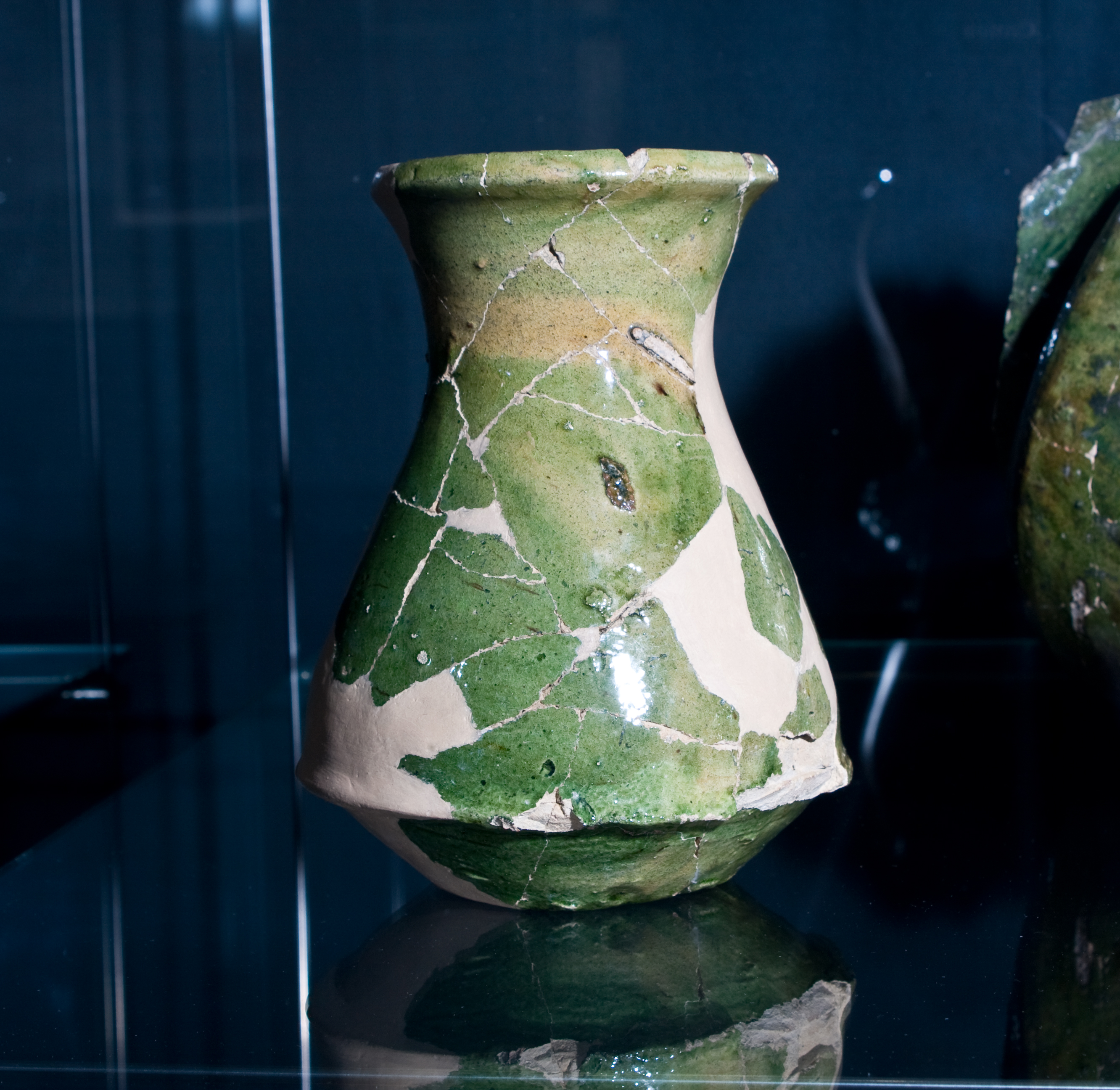
An individual ceramic aludel pot

An Aludel (Arabic: الأثال, al-uṯāl), from Greek αἰθαλίων aithaliōn, 'smoky, sooty, burnt-colored') is a subliming pot used in alchemy. The term refers to a range of earthen tubes, or pots without bottoms, fitted one over another, and diminishing as they advance towards the top. The lowest is adapted to a pot, placed in a furnace, wherein the matter to be sublimed is placed. At the top is a head to retain the flowers, or condensation, which ascends. An aludel was used as a condenser in the sublimation process and thus came to signify the end-stages of transformation and the symbol of creation. Also called the Hermetic Vase, the Philosopher's Egg, and the Vase of the Philosophy.

== Description ==
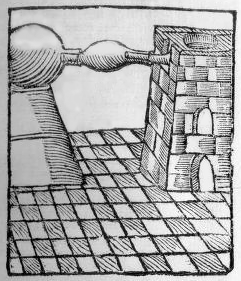
Depiction of an aludel

The aludel is illustrated in a Pseudo-Geber treatise, in the Bibliotheca Chemica Curiosa of Jean-Jacques Manget, and in a Syriac alchemy manuscript conserved in the British Museum. It is mentioned in the "Mafātīḥ al-ʿUlūm" ("Key of Sciences") of al-Khwarazmi.

== See also ==
- Alembic
