= Ibn Umayl =

Tenth-century Egyptian alchemist

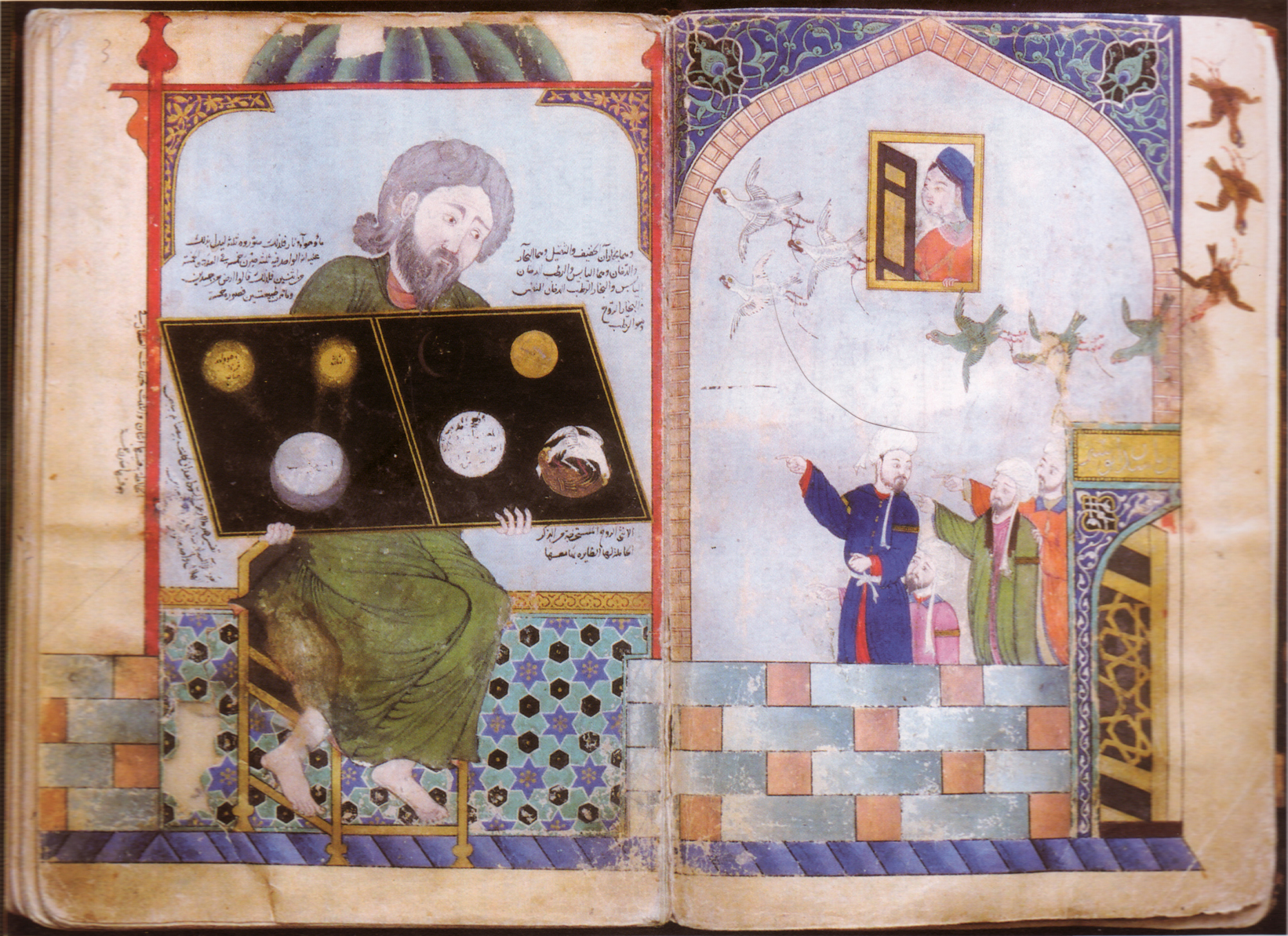
Illustration from a transcript of The Silvery Water, dating to 1339 AD and probably produced in Baghdad.

Muḥammad ibn Umayl al-Tamīmī (Arabic: محمد بن أميل التميمي), known in Latin as Senior Zadith, was an early Muslim alchemist who lived from c. 900 to c. 960 AD.

Very little is known about his life. A Vatican Library catalogue lists one manuscript with the nisba al-Andalusī, suggesting a connection to Islamic Spain, but his writings suggest he mostly lived and worked in Egypt. He also visited North Africa and Iraq. He seems to have led an introverted life style, which he recommended to others in his writings. Statements in his writings, comparing the Alchemical oven with Egyptian temples suggest that he might have lived for some time in Akhmim, the former centre of Alchemy. He also quoted alchemists that had lived in Egypt: Zosimos of Panopolis and Dhul-Nun al-Misri.

In later European literature, ibn Umayl became known by a number of names: his title Sheikh become 'senior' by translation into Latin, the honorific al-sadik rendered phonetically as 'Zadith' and 'ibn Umail' becoming by erroneous translation 'filius Hamuel', 'ben Hamuel' or 'Hamuelis'.

== Historical value ==
The Silvery Water was particularly valuable to Stapleton, Lewis, and Sherwood Taylor, who showed that of some of Umail's Sayings of Hermes came from Greek originals. Also its numerous quotations from earlier alchemical authors allowed, for example, Stapleton to provenance the Turba Philosophorum as being Arabic in origin, and Plessner to date the Turba Philosophorum to ca. 900 AD.

Ibn Umayl's works contain an early commentary on the Emerald Tablet (a short and compact text attributed to Hermes Trismegistus), as well as a number of other Hermetic fragments.

== Symbolic alchemist ==
Ibn Umayl was a mystical and symbolic alchemist. He saw himself as following his “predecessors among the sages of Islam” in rejecting alchemists who take their subject literally. Although such experimenters discovered the sciences of metallurgy and chemistry, Ibn Umayl felt the symbolic meaning of alchemy is the precious goal that is tragically overlooked. He wrote:

“Eggs are only used as an analogy... the philosophers … wrote many books on such things as eggs, hair, the biles, milk, semen, claws, salt, sulphur, iron, copper, silver, mercury, gold and all the various animals and plants … But then people would copy and circulate these books according to the apparent meaning of these things, and waste their possessions and ruin their souls” The Pure Pearl chap. 1.

Moreover, he wrote a Book of the Explanation of the Symbols, there emphasising that the sages spoke "a language in symbols" and that they "would not reveal it [the secret of the stone] except with symbols". In this book, he gives a huge list of names for the stone, the water, etc. thus referring to one inner mystery or religious experience, which - in contrast to an allegory - cannot be fully explained.

For all his devotion to Greek alchemy, Ibn Umayl wrote as a Muslim, frequently mentioning his religion, explaining his ideas "for all our brothers who are pious Muslims" and quoting verses from the Quran.

== The interpreter ==
Ibn Umail presented himself as an interpreter of mysterious symbols. He set his treatise Silvery Water in an Egyptian temple Sidr wa-Abu Sîr, the Prison of Yasuf, where Joseph learned how to interpret the dreams of the Pharaoh. (Koran: 12 Yusuf and Genesis: 4)

"... none of those people who are famous for their wisdom could explain a word of what the philosophers said. In their books they only continue using the same terms that we find in the sages .... What is necessary, if I am a sage to whom secrets have been revealed, and if I have learned the symbolic meanings, is that I explain the mysteries of the sages."

Ibn Umails Book of the Explanation of Symbols (Ḥall ar-Rumūz) can be considered as a summary of his Silvery Water and Starry Earth, giving a "unified synthesis of Ibn Umail's earlier works".

== Modern psychological interpretations ==
The psychologist CG Jung recognized in ibn Umayl's story the ability to bring self-realization to a soul by interpreting dreams, and from the 1940s onwards focused his work on alchemy. In continuation of Jung's approach towards alchemy, the psychologist Theodor Abt states that Ibn Umail's Book of the Silvery Water and the Starry Earth gives a description of a process of distillation, which is meant as image for a process of "continuous pondering over the different symbols", creating thus consciousness (symbolised by 'light', 'gold') out of the reality of matter, nature and body ('starry earth'). This shows that the "alchemical process is in fact entirely a psychological work that is based on dealing with concrete matter and the bodily reality."

== Works Attributed to ibn Umail ==
- Ḥall ar-Rumūz (Solving the Riddles/Book of Explanation of the Symbols)
- ad-Durra an-Naqīya (The Pure Pearl)
- Kitāb al-Maghnisīya (The Book of Magnesia)
- Kitāb Mafātīḥ al-Ḥikma al-‘Uẓmā (The Book of the Keys of the Greatest Wisdom)
- al-Mā’ al-Waraqî wa'l-Arḍ an-Najmīya (The Silvery Water and the Starry Earth) that comprises a narrative; a poem Risālat ash-Shams ilā al-Hilâl (Epistola solis ad lunam crescentem, the letter of the Sun to the Crescent Moon),
- Al-Qasida Nuniya (Poem rhyming on the Letter Nun), with a commentary by Ibn Umail. Ms. Beşir Ağa (Istanbul) 505. For the poem without commentary see Stapelton's Three Arabic Treatises
- Al-Qasida al-mīmīya (Poem rhyming on the Letter Mīm), with a commentary by Ibn Umail

== Later publications ==
- 12th century: al-Mā’ al-Waraqī (Silvery Water) became a classic of Islamic Alchemy. It was translated into Latin in the twelfth or thirteenth century and was widely disseminated among alchemists in Europe often called Senioris Zadith tabula chymica (The Chemical Tables of Senior Zadith)
- 1339: In the al-Mâ’ al-Waraqī transcript that is now in Topkapi Palace Library, Istanbul, the scribe added a note to the diagram that the sun represents the spirit (al-rūḥ) and the moon the soul (al-nafs) so the "Letter from the Sun to the Moon" is about perfecting the receptivity of soul to spirit.
- 14th century: Chaucer's Canon's Yeoman's Tale has alchemy as a theme and cites Chimica Senioris Zadith Tabula (The Chemical Tables of Senior Zadith). Chaucer considered Ibn Umayl to be a follower of Plato.
- 15th century: Aurora consurgens is a commentary by Pseudo Aquinas on a Latin translation of Al-mâ' al-waraqî (Silvery Water).
- 1605 Senioris Zadith filii Hamuelis tabula chymica (The Chemical Tables of Senior Zadith son of Hamuel) was printed as part I of Philosophiae Chymicae IV. Vetvstissima Scripta by Joannes Saur
- 1660: The Chemical Tables of Senior Zadith retitled Senioris antiquissimi philosophi libellus was printed in volume 5 of the Theatrum chemicum.
- 1933 Three Arabic treatises on alchemy by Muhammad bin Umail (10th century AD), prints the three treatises in Arabic, and prints them in 13th century Latin as they were partially translated from the Arabic to Latin in 13th century. Printed in the journal Memoirs of the Asiatic Society of Bengal, Volume 12, Calcutta.
- 1997/2006: Corpus Alchemicum Arabicum 1A: An improved translation of Book of the Explanation of the Symbols. Kitāb Ḥall ar-Rumūz with a commentary by the Jungian psychologist and scholar Marie-Louise von Franz.

== Gallery ==
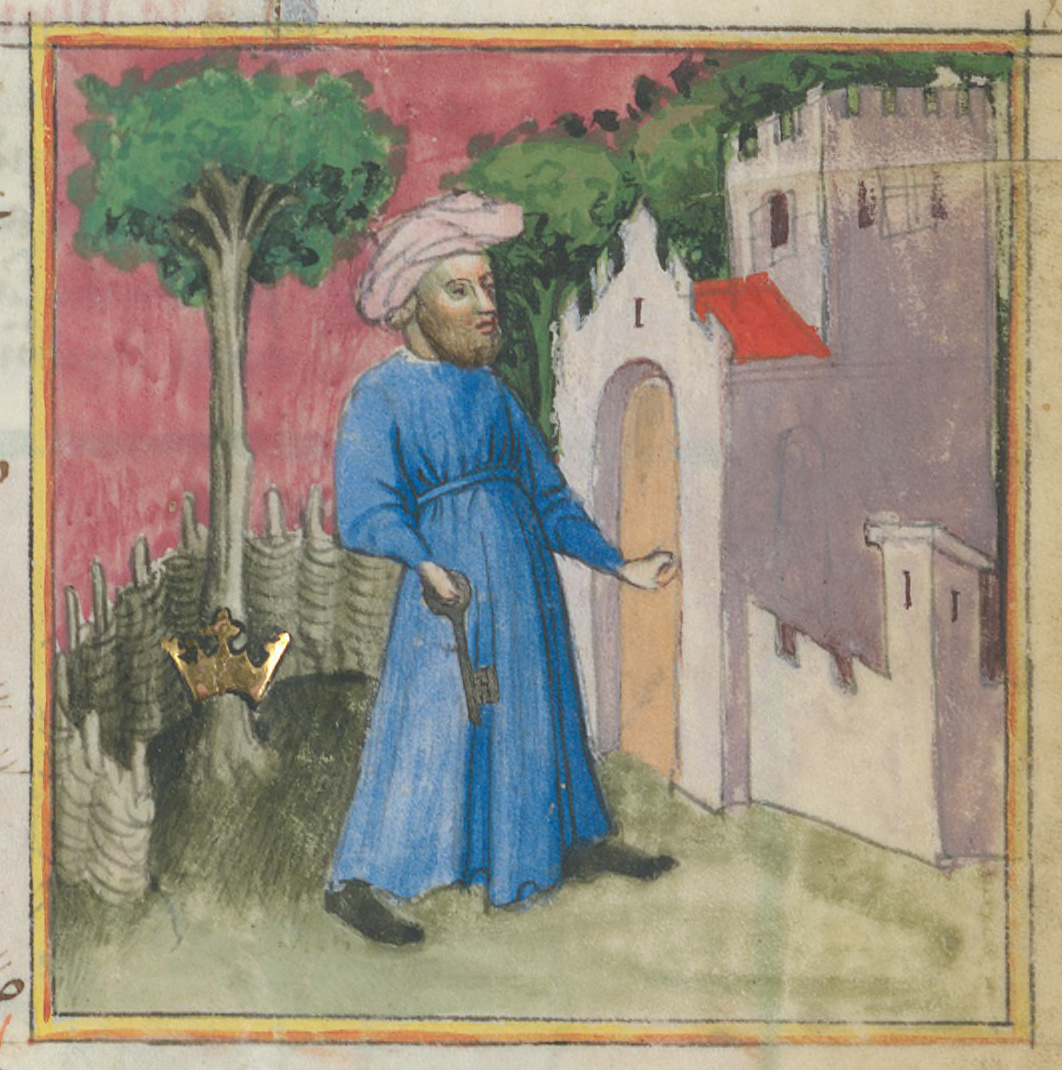
Ibn Umayl was depicted in later European books. In Aurora consurgens, c.1400, Here Senior Zadith carries the Key that opens The Treasure House of Wisdom.

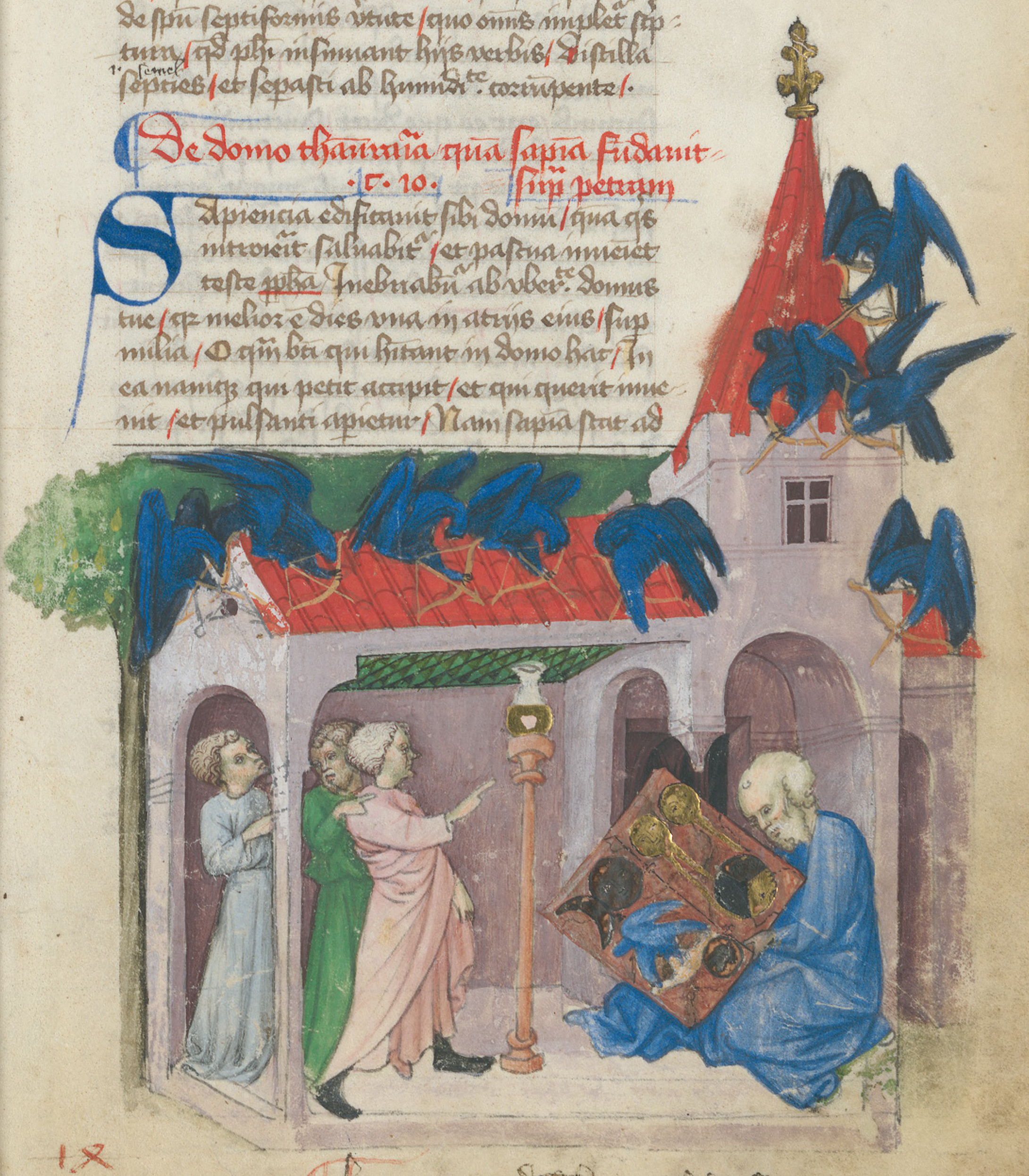
Aurora Consurgens also illustrates the statue of an ancient sage holding the tablet of wisdom described in Ibn Umayl's The Silvery Water
