= Madelung =

Madelung is a German surname. It is also the name of multiple terms in mathematics and science based on people named Madelung.

== People ==
- Erwin Madelung (1881–1972), German physicist
- Georg Hans Madelung (1889–1972), German aeronautical engineer
- Otto Wilhelm Madelung (1846–1926), German surgeon
- Otfried Madelung (1922–2017), Germany solid-state physicist
- Wilferd Madelung (1930–2023), German-American author and scholar of Islamic history

== Mathematics and science ==
- Madelung constant, chemical energy of an ion in a crystal, named after Erwin Madelung
- Madelung equations, Erwin Madelung's equivalent alternative formulation of the Schrödinger equation

== Medicine ==
- Madelung's deformity, characterized by malformed wrists and wrist bones, and short stature, named after Otto Wilhelm Madelung
- Madelung's syndrome, also known as "benign symmetric lipomatosis", named after Otto Wilhelm Madelung
