= Musaeum Hermeticum =

Compendium of alchemical texts (1678)

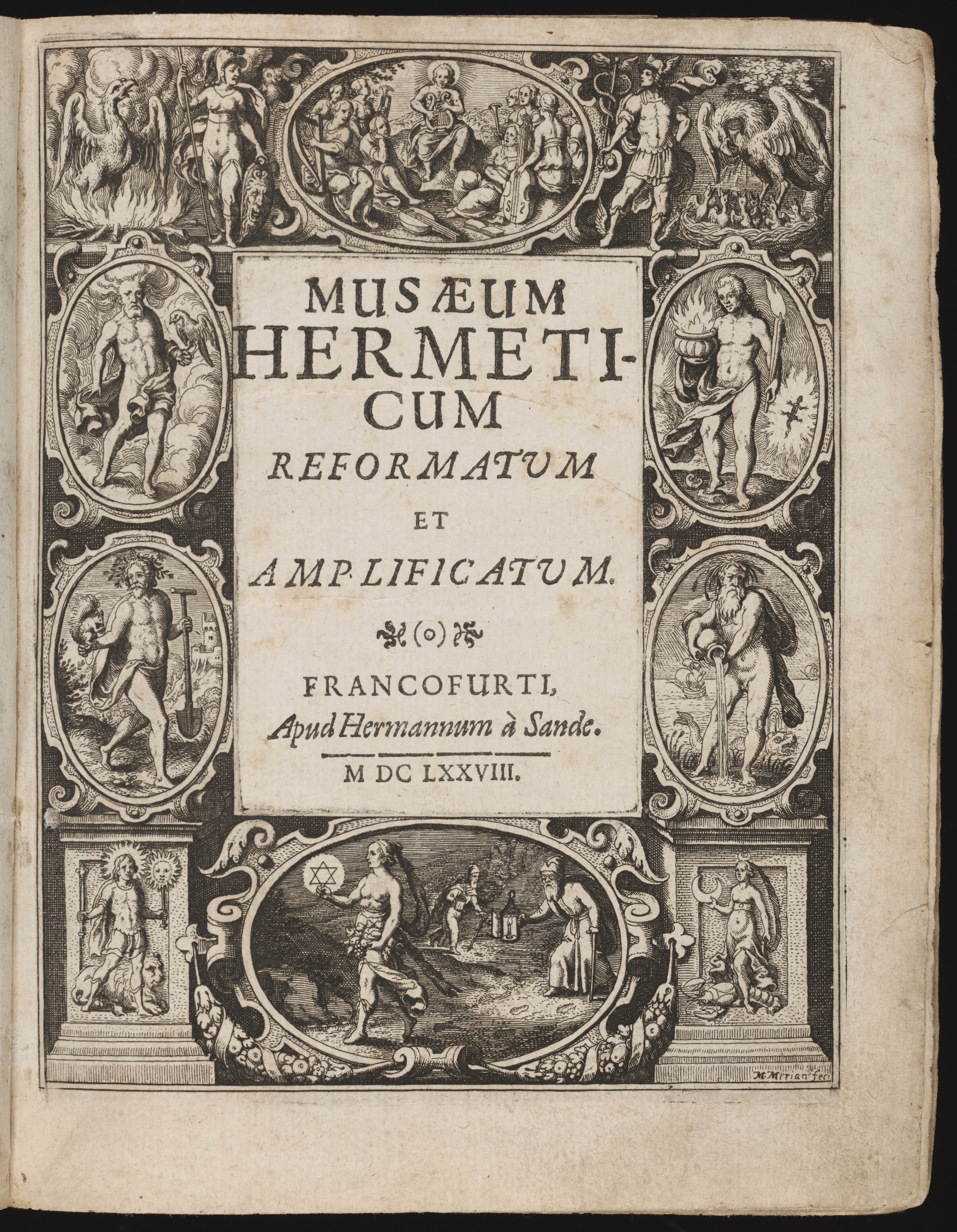
Title page of a 1678 edition at the Beinecke Rare Book & Manuscript Library

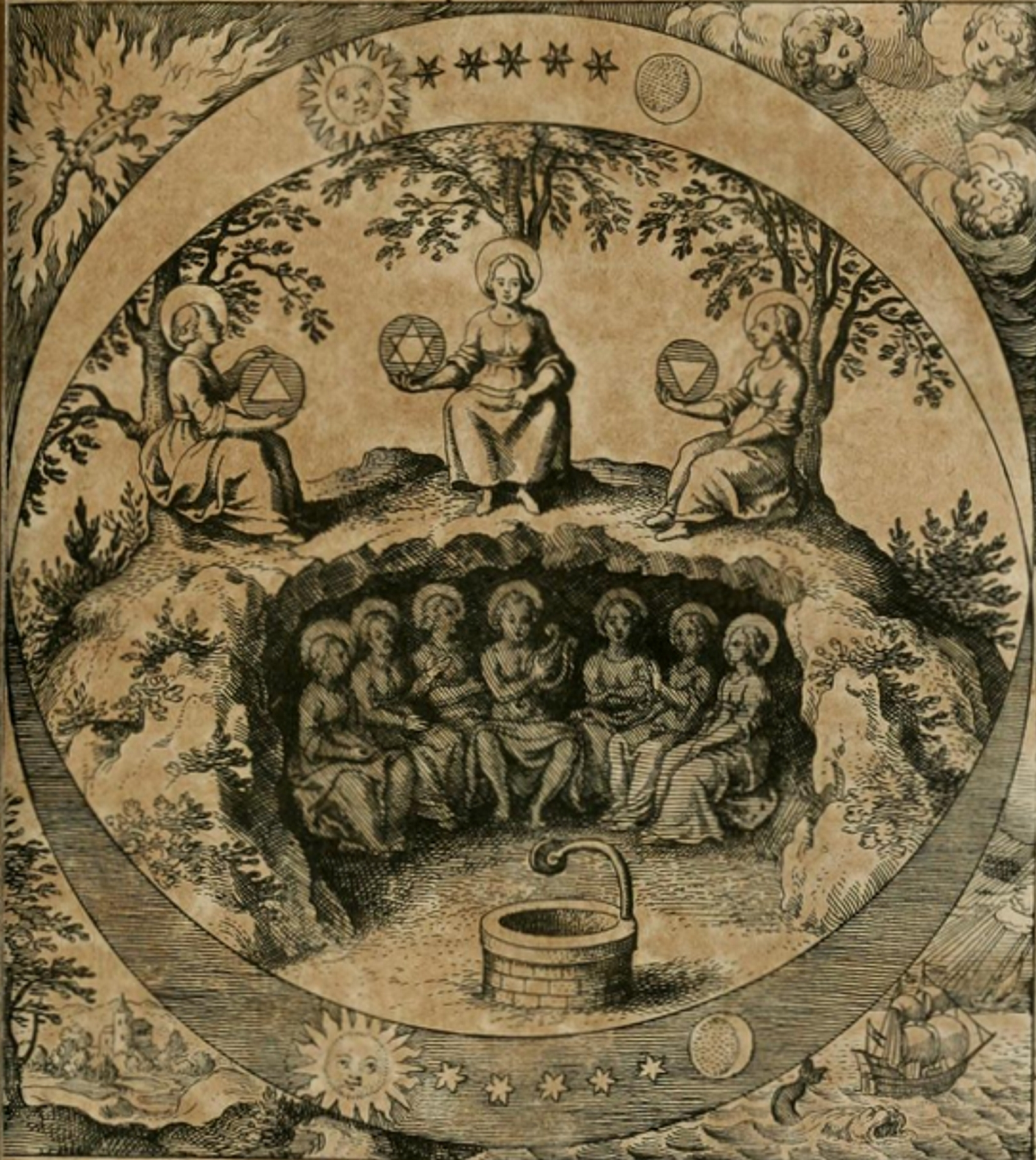
Frontispiece of the Musaeum Hermeticum

Musaeum Hermeticum ("Hermetic library") is a compendium of alchemical texts first published in German, in Frankfurt, 1625 by Lucas Jennis. Additional material was added for the 1678 Latin edition, which in turn was reprinted in 1749.

== Purpose ==
Its purpose was apparently to supply in a compact form a representative collection of relatively brief and less ancient alchemical writings; it could be regarded as a supplement to those large storehouses of Hermetic learning such as the Theatrum Chemicum, or Jean-Jacques Manget's Bibliotheca Chemica Curiosa. It seemed to represent a distinctive school in Alchemy, less committed to the past and less obscure than the works of older and more traditional alchemical masters.

== Title ==
The full Latin title is: "Musæum Hermeticum, omnes sopho-spagyricæ artis discipulos fidelissime erudiens, quo pacto summa illa veraque Medicina, qua res omne, qualemcumque defectum patientes, instaurari possunt (quæ alias Benedictus Lapis Sapientum appellatur) inveniri ac haberi queat inveniri ac haberi queat. Continens tractatus chymicos novem præatantissimos, quorum nomina et seriem versa pagella indicabit. In gratiam filiorum doctrinæ, quibus Germanicum Idioma ignotum, in Latinum conversum ac juris publici factum. Jennis"

== Content ==
=== First edition (1625) ===
The first edition contained:

1. The Remonstrances of Nature ascribed to Jean de Meung
2. The Twelve Keys of Basil Valentine
3. Subtle Allegory (Michael Maier)
1. Three Treatise of Philalethes
2. The Book of Alze
3. Open Entrance to the Closed Palace - Philalethes
4. A Tract of Great Price
5. The Only True Way
6. The Testament of Cremer
7. The Glory of the World
8. The Waterstone of the Wise
9. The Golden Tract concerning the Philosopher's Stone

The illustrated book contains 445 + 35 pages.

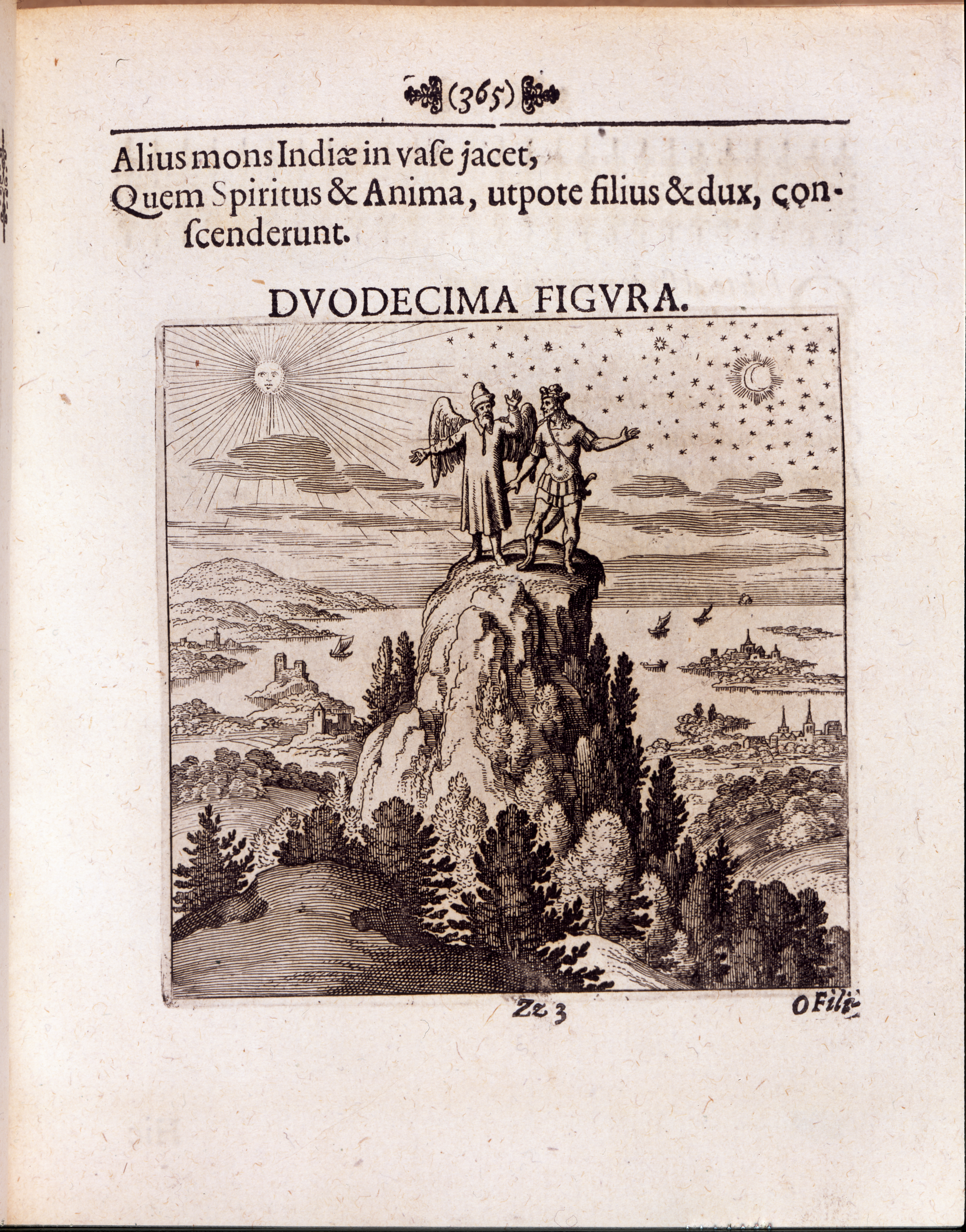
"Spirit and Soul are acting as child and guide" from the Musaeum Hermeticum, 1678 Edition, Science History Institute

=== 1678 edition ===
The 1678 edition is 863 pages long, and includes:

1. Aureus tractatus de philosophorum lapide
2. Aureum seculum redivivum
3. Hydrolithus sophicus
4. Aquarium sapientum
5. Demonstratio naturae, quam errantibus chymicis facit
6. Via veritatis unicae
7. Elegans, perutile et praestans opusculum, viam veritatis aperiens
8. Gloria mundi, aliâs, paradysi tabula
9. Vera priscae scientiae descriptio
10. De lapide philosophico tractatus eximius
11. Lambsprinck nobilis germani philosophi antiqui libellus De lapide philosophico
12. De lapide philosophico
13. Tripus Aureus
14. Tres tractatus chymici selectissimi
15. Basilii Valentini, benedictini ordinis monachi, Germani, practica una cum 12. clavibus et appendice
16. Practica cum duodecim clavibus et appendice, de magno lapide antiquorum sapientum
17. Testamentum cremeri, abbatis westmonasteriensis, angli, ordinis benedictine
18. Novum lumen chemicum, e naturae fonte et manuali experientia depromptum
19. Introitus apertus, ad occlusum regis palatium
20. Subtilis allegoria super secreta chymiae perspicuae utilitatis et iucundae meditationis
21. Philalethae tractatus tres
22. Metallorum metamorphosis
23. Brevis manuductio ad rubinum coelestum
24. Fons chymicae veritatis
25. Vitulus aureus
