= Samuel Norton =

Samuel Norton may refer to:

- Samuel Norton (alchemist) (1548–1621), English writer
- Samuel Norton, a character in The Shawshank Redemption
- Samuel Tilden Norton (1877–1959), Los Angeles–based architect

== See also ==
- Sam Norton-Knight (born 1983), Australian rugby union footballer
