= Tripus Aureus =

1618 book by Michael Maier

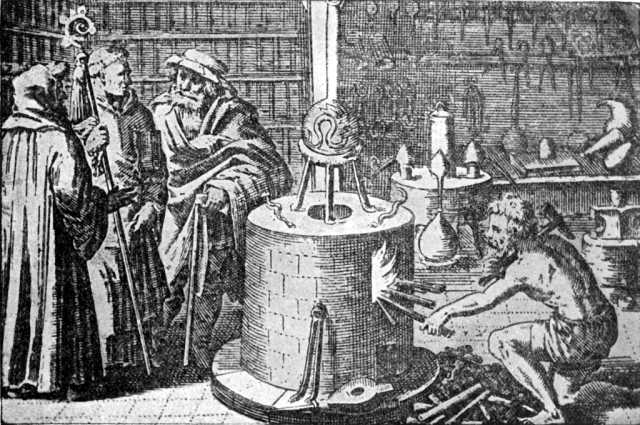
- Title page engraving showing Valentine, Norton, and Cremer.
- Author: Michael Maier
- Original title: Tripus Aureus, hoc est, Tres Tractatus Chymici Selectissimi, nempe; I. Basilii Valentini, Benedictini Ordinis monachi, Germani, Practica vna cum 12. clauibus & appendice, ex Germanico; II. Thomas Nortoni, Angli Philosophi Crede Mihi seu Ordinale, ante annos 140. ab authore scriptum, nunc ex Anglicano manuscripto in Latinum translatum, phrasi cuiusque authoris vt & sententia retenta; III. Cremeri cuiusdam Abbatis Westmonasteriensis Angli Testamentum, hactenus nondum publicatum, nunc in diuersarum nationum gratiam editi, & figuris cupro affabre incisis ornati opera & studio.
- Subject: Alchemy
- Published: Printed by Paul Jacob
- Publisher: Lucas Jennis, Frankfurt.
- Publication date: 1618

Tripus Aureus or The Golden Tripod is an alchemical book by Michael Maier published in 1618 by Lucas Jennis. It contains three alchemical texts: The "twelve keys" of Basil Valentine, Thomas Norton's Ordinal of Alchemy (1477), and The Testament of Cremer.

== The Twelve Keys of Basil Valentine ==
This alchemical book is spuriously attributed to the figure of Basil Valentine, and was first published in 1599. It's presented as a sequence of alchemical operations encoded allegorically, in words to which images have been added. Maier's Latin edition in Tripus aureus contains woodcut illustrations for all twelve keys for the first time. These were engraved by Matthaeus Merian.

== Testament of Cremer ==
The Testament of Cremer is a pseudo-alchemical text which originated in sixteenth century England. Two manuscript copies of it exist. One is in the hand of Elias Ashmole and is housed in the Bodleian Library. The other is a French translation in the Wellcome Collection dated to around 1675. Maier's transcription is the earliest extant copy of the text.

The author calls himself John Cremer, Abbott of Westminster. According to the text, he lived at the time of Raymond Lull (c. 1232–c. 1315) and King Edward III (1312–1377). However, there is no such abbot on the rolls of Westminster. The medieval origins of the document are doubtful. Maier translated the text from English into Latin and it was published for the first time in his 1618 volume. Maier warns his readers:

Either the meaning of the Author or the letter of his writings is deceitful. Be on your guard, therefore. Everywhere a serpent lurks among the flowers. Yet scorn not a friend who spoke as plainly as he might. Beneath the shadowy foliage of words is concealed the golden fruit of Truth.

Cremer's text was also published in Musaeum Hermeticum (1625) and later in Arthur Edward Waite's Hermetic Museum.

=== Contents ===
The introduction tells the author's story of a journey to Italy. According to legend, Cremer visited Lull in Milan 1330. The two men returned to England, where they worked to supply gold to Edward III, which he used against France. After a five verse hymn, a pseudo alchemical recipe follows in seven short chapters. This text contains little of the allegory and deck names common in alchemical literature.
