= Samuel Norton (alchemist) =

English country gentleman and alchemist

Samuel Norton (1548–1621) was an English country gentleman and alchemist.

== Life ==
The son of Sir George Norton of Abbots Leigh in Somerset, he was great-grandson of Thomas Norton, author of the Ordinal of Alchemy. He studied for some time at St John's College, Cambridge, but records show no degree. On the death of his father, in 1584, he succeeded to the estates. Early in 1585 he was in the commission of the peace for the county, but apparently suffered removal; he was reappointed in October 1589, on the recommendation of Thomas Godwin, bishop of Bath and Wells . He was sheriff of Somerset in 1589, and was appointed muster master of Somerset and Wiltshire on 30 June 1604.

== Works ==
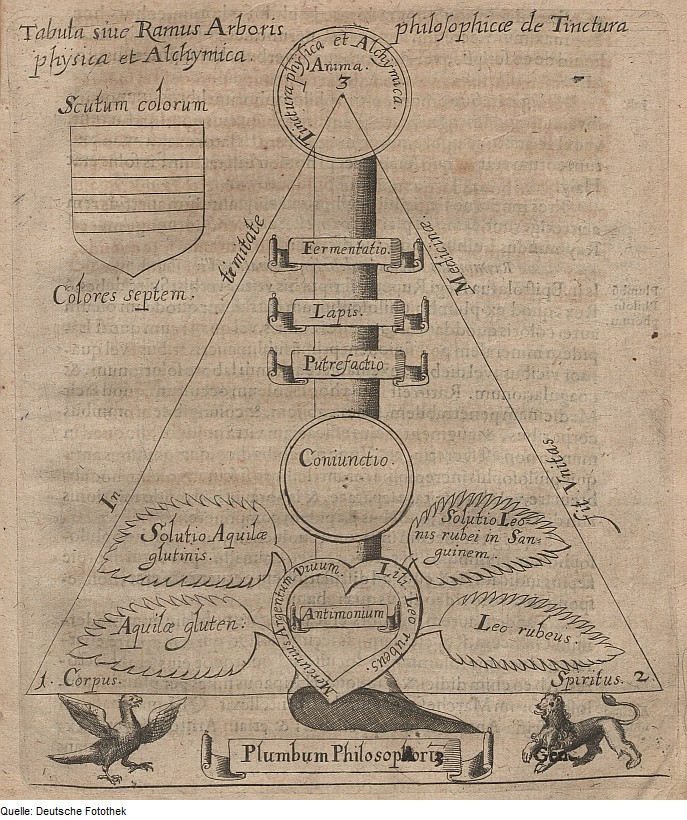
Ramist tincture tree of physics and alchemy, illustration from Catholicon Physicorum (1630), by Samuel Norton and Edmund Deane

Norton was the author of alchemical tracts; they were edited and published in Latin by Edmund Deane, at Frankfurt in 1630. The titles were:

- Mercurius Redivivus.
- Catholicon Physicorum, seu modus conficiendi Tincturam Physicam et Alchymicam.
- Venus Vitriolata, in Elixer conversa.
- Elixer, seu Medicina Vitæ seu modus conficiendi verum Aurum et Argentum Potabile.
- Metamorphosis Lapidum ignobilium in Gemmas quasdam pretiosas.
- Saturnus Saturatus Dissolutus et Cœlo restitutus, seu modus componendi Lapidem Philosophicum tam album quam rubeum e plumbo.
- Alchymiæ Complementum et Perfectio.
- Tractatulus de Antiquorum Scriptorum Considerationibus in Alchymia.

A German translation of the treatises was published in Nuremberg in 1667, in Dreyfaches hermetisches Kleeblat.

Norton's works circulated earlier; from John Robson, to Richard Napier, to Elias Ashmole. Portions of the work in manuscript, brought together before Deane edited his volume under the title of Ramorum Arboris Philosophicalis Libri tres, are in the British Library (Sloane MS. 3667, ff. 17–21, 24–28, and 31–90), and the Bodleian Library (Ashmolean MS. 1478, vi. ff. 42–104). Norton was occupied on the work in 1598 and 1599. Among the Ashmolean MSS. is a work by Norton entitled The Key of Alchimie, written in 1578, when he was at St John's College, and it is dedicated to Elizabeth I; an abridgement is in the Ashmolean MS. In 1574 Norton translated George Ripley's Bosome Booke into English.

== Notes ==
Attribution

This article incorporates text from a publication now in the public domain: Lee, Sidney, ed. (1895). "Norton, Samuel". Dictionary of National Biography. Vol. 41. London: Smith, Elder & Co.
