= Guido di Montanor =

15th century alchemist

Guido di Montanor was a Greek or French alchemist who lived in the 15th century.

His name is variably given as sometimes referred to as Montaner or Montaynor. His nationality is uncertain, either Greek or French. From references in the works of George Ripley and Ramon Llull, his activity is dated between the end of the 14th century and the beginning of the 15th century. His work, such as the Scala Philosophorum, is referenced in quotations and extracts in subsequent sources.

== Alchemy ==
Di Montanor was a follower of the alchemy of the elixir and mercury alone. He integrated the different settings of Ramon Llull and Arnaldo on one side, and Paolo of Taranto on the other. His main work was the Scala philosophorum, meaning "Scale of the Philosophers". This work was one of the first known to present a systematic order and structure for alchemic processes.
