= Lucas Jennis =

German engraver and publisher

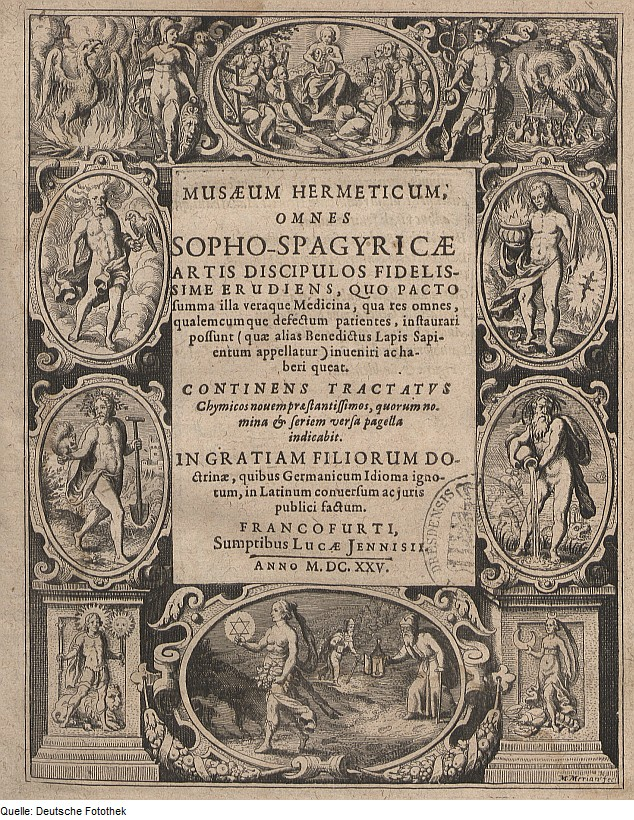
Title page of Musaeum Hermeticum, published by Jennis in 1625.

Lucas Jennis (1590–1630) was a German engraver. He was the leading publisher of alchemical works of his time.

== Life ==
Jennis was born to Lucas Jennis the Elder in Frankfurt. His father was a wealthy goldsmith, jeweller, and engraver who had fled persecution in Brussels.

Jennis’ father died in 1606. A year later, Johann Israel de Bry (1565–1609) married Jennis’ widowed mother. Jennis was now a member of the de Bry family, who were famous for their engraving work. Johann Theodor de Bry (1561–1623) was his step uncle.

== Works ==
Jennis’ publishing career began around 1616. He operated in Oppenheim and Frankfurt. In that time he published the alchemical works of Michael Maier, Johann Daniel Mylius, Daniel Stolz von Stolzenberg, Thomas Norton and many others.

His work was an influential aspect of seventeenth century alchemy, which saw the printing of an unprecedented number of alchemical texts. His copperplate engravings were used in the production of Hermetic emblems, used to convey the symbolic ideas in alchemy pictorially.
