= Thomas Norton (alchemist) =

English poet and alchemist

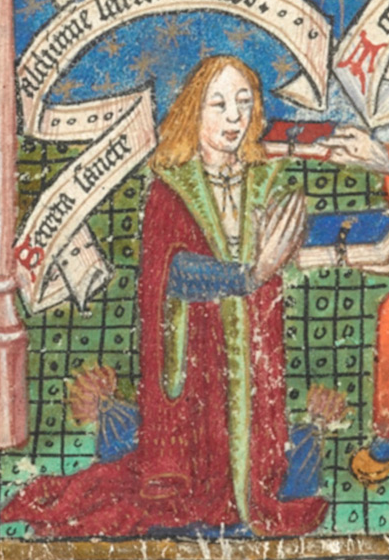
- Illumination of Thomas Norton from a contemporary manuscript of the Ordinal, likely written under his supervision.
- Born: before 1436
- Died: 30 November 1513
- Occupations: Poet, alchemist
- Notable work: The Ordinal of Alchemy
- Relatives: Samuel Norton

Thomas Norton (b. <1436 – d. c. 1513) was an English poet and alchemist best known for his 1477 alchemical poem, The Ordinal of Alchemy.

== Biography ==
This letter receiving, I hasted full sore
To ride to my master an hundred miles and more,
And there Forty dayes continually,
I learned all the seacrets of Alkimy

— Thomas Norton, The Ordinal of Alchemy

Thomas Norton was born to a merchant, mayor and sheriff of Bristol, called Walter Norton (fl. 1392-1421). In the Ordinal, he says he was one of the three alchemists in England who worked together at the time of the change of the coin under Sir Hugh Bryce (1464) and that he was a full alchemist at barely 28, which means that he cannot have been born after 1436. Norton was present to sign the transfer of some property in Wiltshire in 1454 and must have been of age by then, so an earlier date of birth is more likely. He was born "undir a crosse in thende of shirys three", possibly in Colerne, on the border of Wiltshire, Somerset, and Gloucestershire. Thomas Norton was a member of the important Bristol merchant family of Norton.

Norton is believed to have studied under one of the most prominent alchemists of his time, George Ripley, writing that he "learned all the secrets of Alkimy" through his words. Norton is known to have studied alchemy in the service of King Edward IV, becoming a gentleman of Edward's privy chamber, past at least 1466. Perhaps to compensate for being partly cut out of his father's will, Norton began the Ordinal in 1477.

Norton was rewarded with land confiscated from the rebels upon Edward IV's return from exile in 1471. In March 1479, Norton accused the incumbent mayor of Bristol of high treason, surrounding an argument concerning the legacy of his father as the mayor. Norton appealed to the king for support but was forced into silence. Norton died on 30 November 1513

Norton's great grandson, Samuel Norton, also became an alchemist - writing of his great grandfather in his work The Key of Alchemy.

== The Ordinal of Alchemy ==
=== Content ===
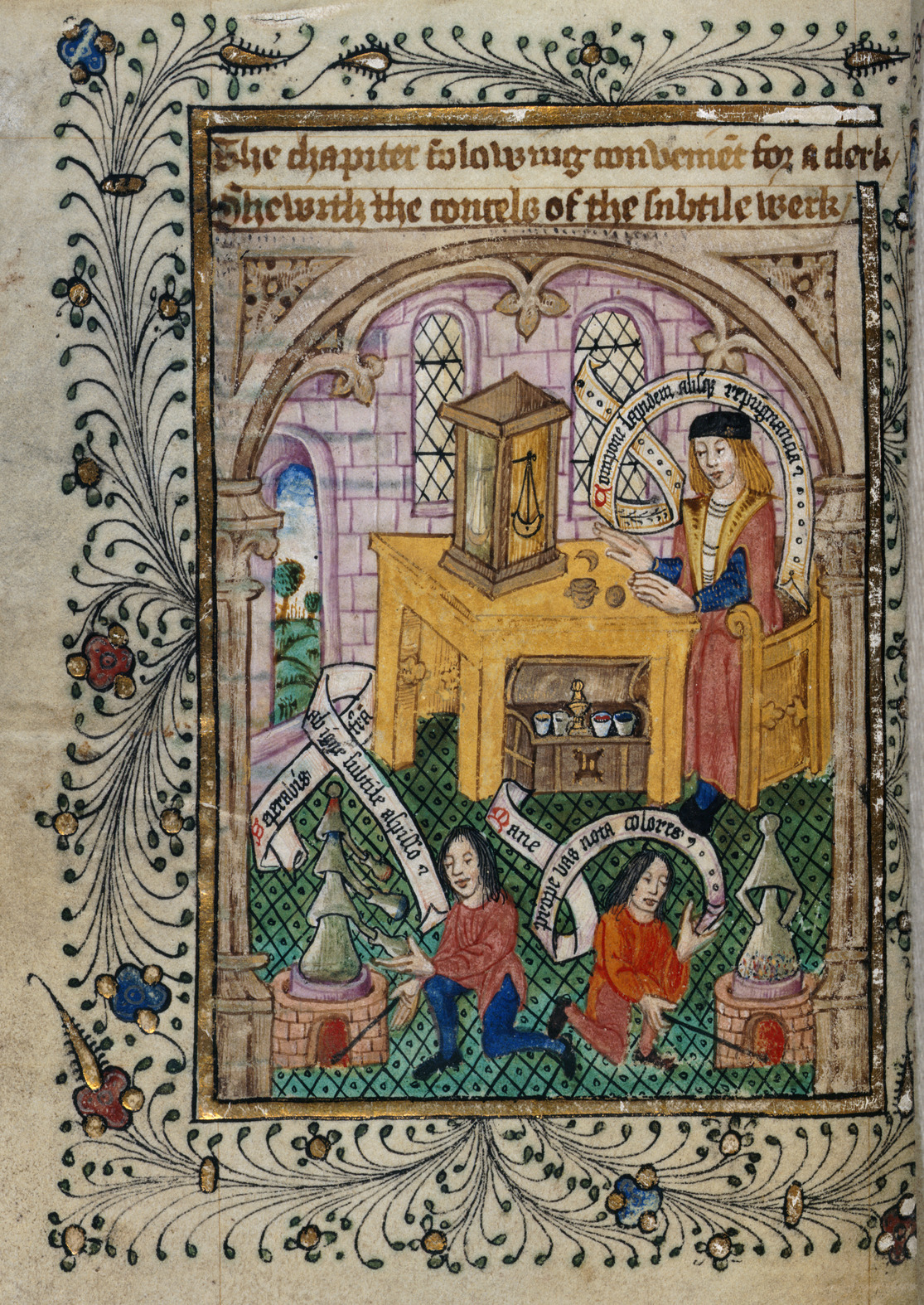
An alchemical master "sits at a table in the background surrounded by the symbols of alchemy: a silver crescent moon, a gold ball and a vessel used in experimentation". From the above-mentioned manuscript.

The Ordinal of Alchemy is an alchemical poem composed of 3,102 lines of irregularly rhymed Middle English.

In the beginning of the poem, Norton lambasts the naivete of others who have bastardized the ideas of the ancient masters of alchemy. He tells us to read his book multiple times to get the best out of it, hinting at the esoteric hiding of his name in how he describes that "chaunging of some one sillable May make this Boke unprofitable". He also gives us something of a biography, professing that he began his study of alchemy at a young age and learned "the seacrets of Alkimy" from the adept alchemist George Ripley. He describes that on two occasions he made an "elixir of life" only for it to be stolen away from him by the greed of others - first by his valet, and the second time by a merchant's wife.

Notably, the book contains several verses satirising certain alchemical or hermetic connections to the Middle English poet Geoffrey Chaucer, who had written The Canon's Yeoman's Tale, a work satirizing alchemists. Inadvertently, this played a large part in the Renaissance conception of Chaucer as an alchemist, which was later abandoned as it was found to be untrue.

The book also contains the first supposed description of a dampers, describing Norton's construction of a furnace with no fewer than sixty temperatures it could attain at a single time.

=== Discovery of Norton's authorship ===
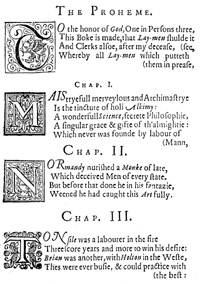
The first syllables of the first four chapters, showing the name of Thomas Norton (collage).

In 1617 Michael Maier in his Symbola Aureae Mensae, identifies Norton as such:

THOMAS NORTONUS, of Bristol, master of the perfect art, (as seen in two initial syllables of each chapter of the book, which describes this art) well known; wrote English poems, very sharp, not yet published.

Similarly, in 1652 Elias Ashmole in his Theatrum Chemicum Britannicum identifies Norton:

From the first word of the Proeme, and the Initiall letters of the six following Chapters [...] we may collect the authors Name and place of Residence: For those letters, (together with the first line of the seventh Chapter) speak thus [...].

Both of these men were drawing from the rather esoterically hidden message found in the Ordinal - where, by connecting the syllables from the first lines of the first 7 chapters of the book, a message is found. This message being: "To Mais Nor Ton Of Brise To", or as Maier and Ashmole interpreted it "Thomas Norton of Bristol".

=== Authorship controversy ===
For where quick sentencce shall seame not to be
Ther may wise men finde selcouthe previtye;
And chaunging of some one sillable
May make this Boke unprofitable
Therefore trust not one Reading or twaine
But twenty tymes it would be over sayne;

— Thomas Norton, The Ordinal of Alchemy

Norton was first identified as the author of the 'Ordinal' in 1617 and has since become the widespread identification of the work's author. However, in 1932, two scholars, M. Nierenstein and P. F. Chapman, criticised this identification (which they named "the Maier-Ashmole hypothesis") under the grounds that, beyond the esoteric link drawn by Maier and Ashmole, very little contemporary evidence seemed to link Norton to the Ordinal. This criticism received little attention in its time and a 1957 article by historian J. Reidy roundly criticised the article, arguing conclusively in favour of the 'Maier-Ashmole hypothesis' by citing various contemporary pieces of evidence that imply that Norton was a significant alchemist and very likely wrote the Ordinal.

=== Editions and legacy ===
Norton's Ordinal is reported to exist in 32 manuscripts. A very early and beautifully illuminated manuscript of the Ordinal exists in the British Library (BL Add MS 10302) made during Norton's lifetime and likely under his supervision; it contains many illustrations of alchemical processes and a portrait of Norton himself (see above). A copy from the 16th century is currently owned by the National Library of Israel. This copy holds an inscription noticing that this manuscript was given in 1837 by Baron Bolland to C. J. Blomfield D.D., Bishop of London.

Thomas Norton's Ordinal became a very influential alchemical text in the 17th century, with its Latin translation in Michael Maier's Tripus Aureus. It was reprinted in English as the premier text in Elias Ashmole's Theatrum Chemicum Britannicum, along with various engravings of illuminations from Ashmole's manuscript of the work (see below), perhaps based on the British Library MS.

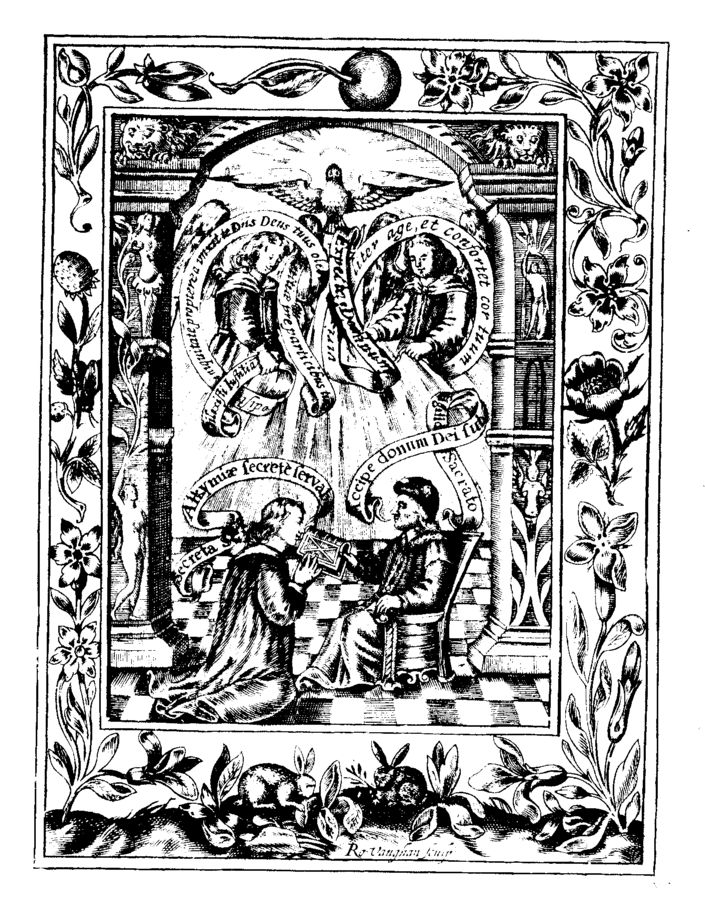
Student receiving a book of alchemy from a master.

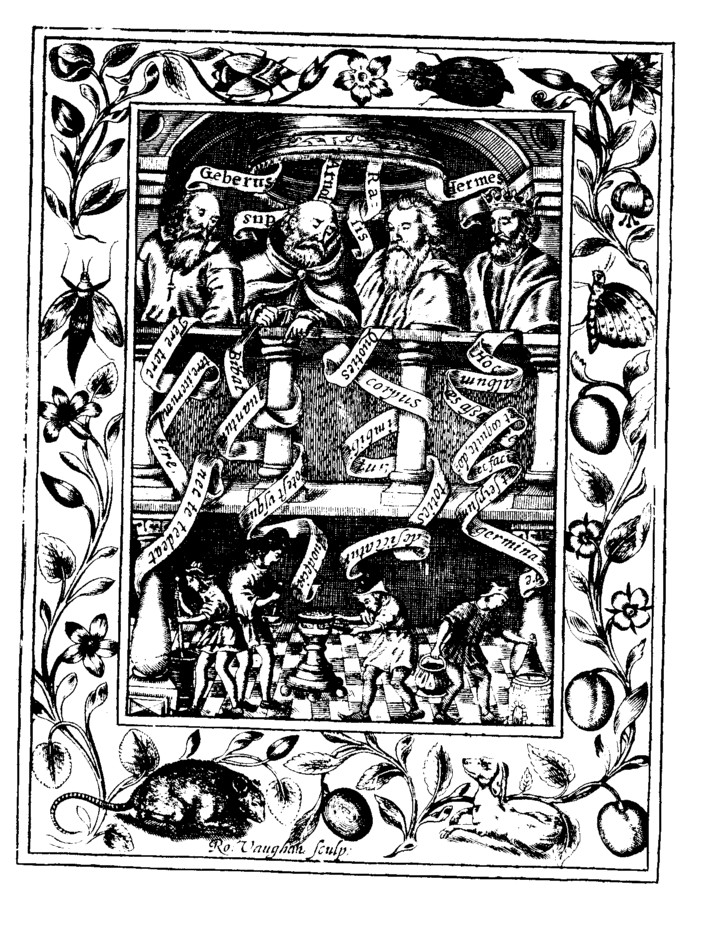
The ancient masters of alchemy (Geberus, Arnold, Razi, Hermes) ruling over wisdom.

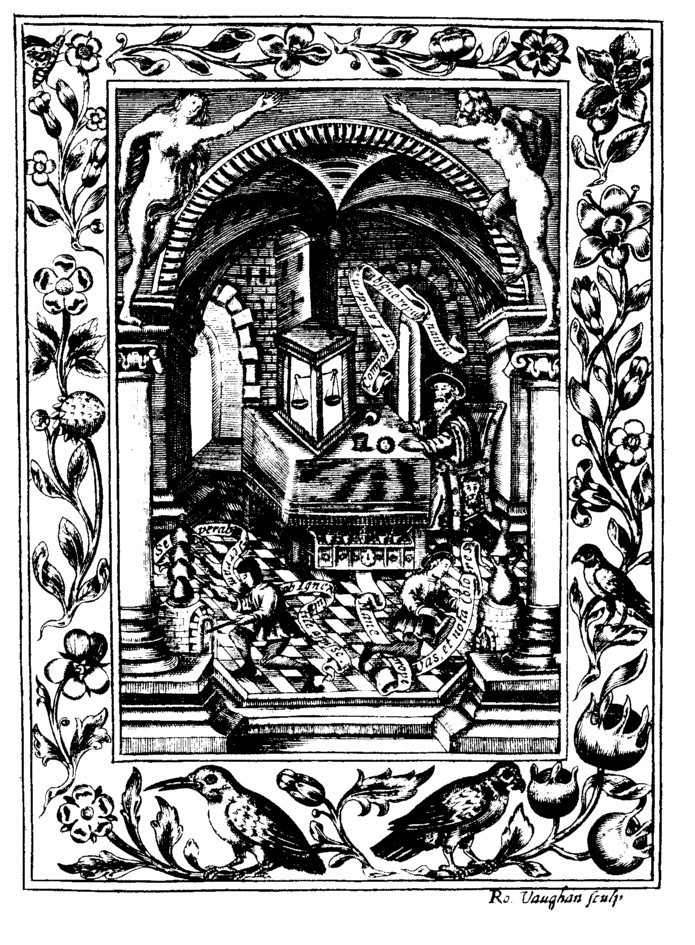
Alchemist writing and furnaces being used in front of an early depiction of a scale.

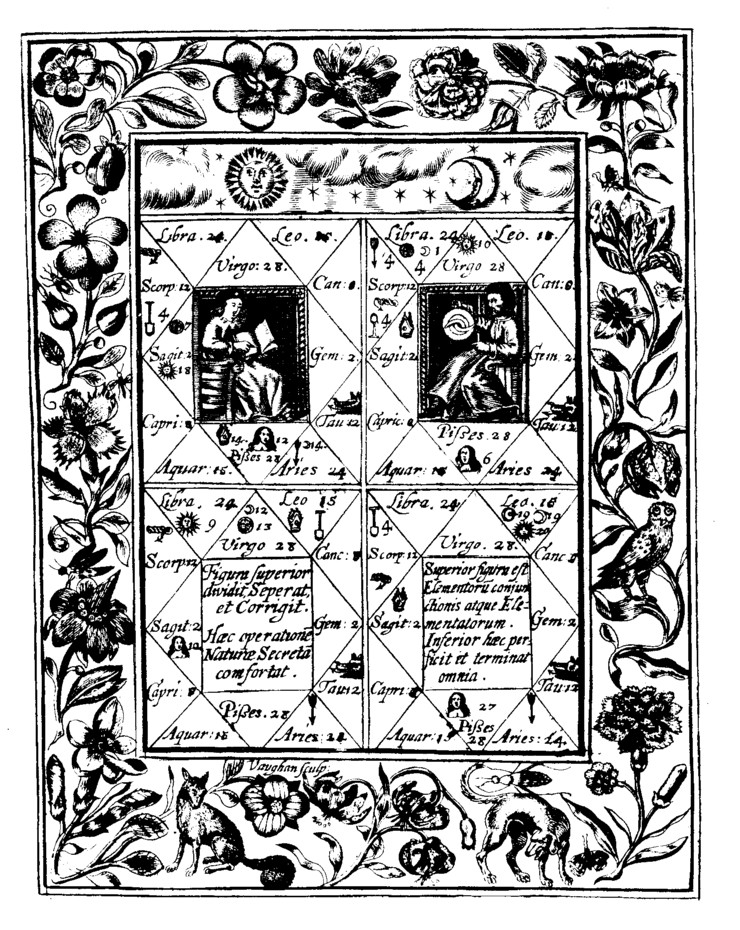
Astrological table for the various states of the sun.

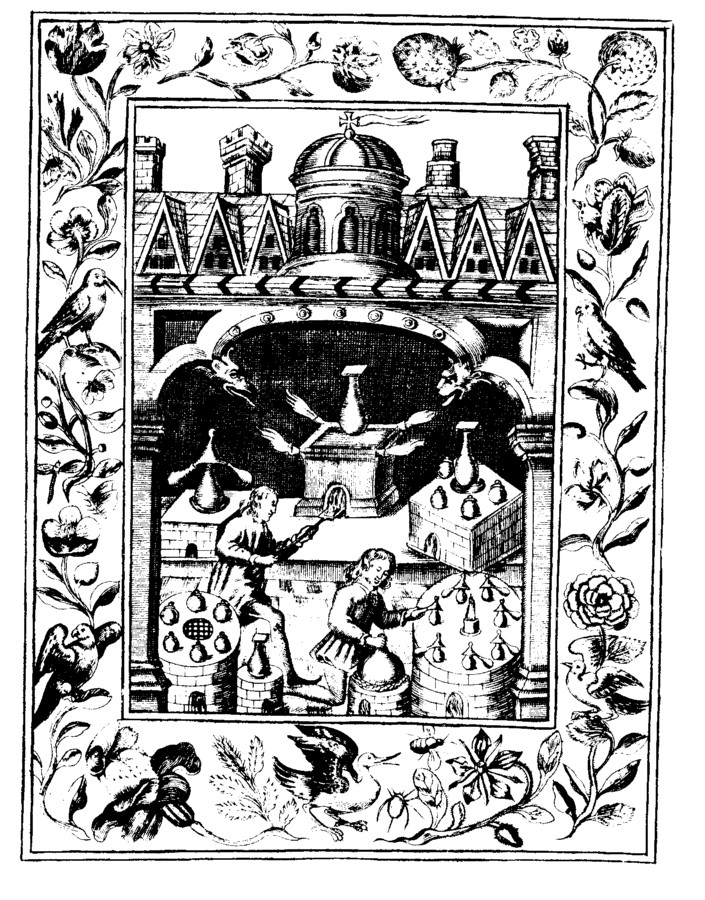
Alchemists experimenting in an early laboratory.
