= Basil Valentine =

Pseudonymous German author

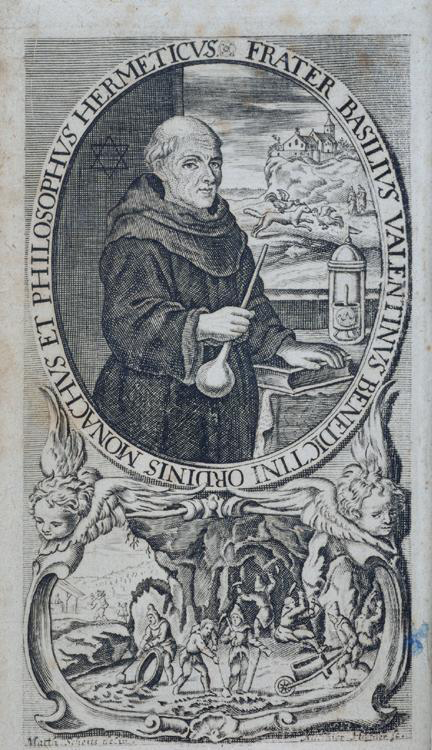
"Frater Basilius Valentinus, monk of the Benedictine order and Hermetic philosopher": imaginary portrait in the frontispiece from Chymische Schrifften, 1717

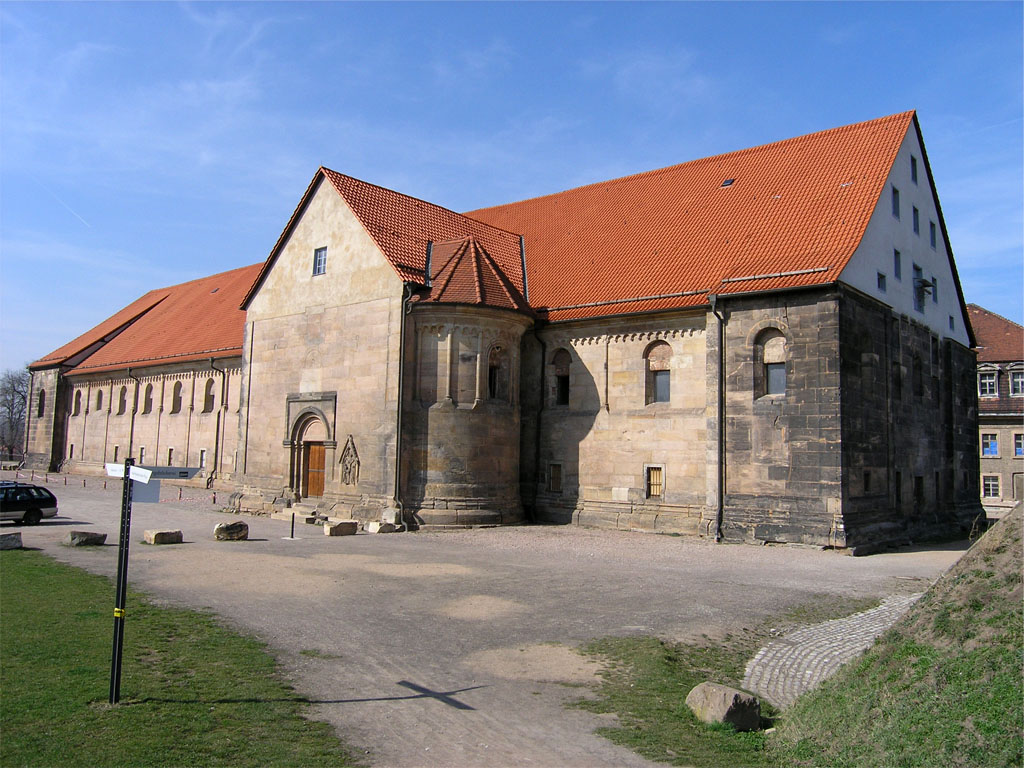
The Peterskirche, Erfurt, as it appeared in 2007

Basilius Valentinus, Anglicised as Basil Valentine, was a purported 15th-century German author, ostensibly a alchemist, possibly Canon of the Benedictine Priory of Saint Peter in Erfurt, Germany but more likely a pseudonym used by one or several 16th-century German authors.

According to John Maxson Stillman, who wrote on the history of chemistry, there is no evidence of such a name on the rolls in Germany or Rome and no mention of this name before 1600. His putative history, like his imaginary portrait, appears to be of later creation than the writings themselves.

During the 18th century it was suggested that the author of the works attributed to Basil Valentine was Johann Thölde, a salt manufacturer in Germany who lived roughly 1565–1624. Modern scholarship now suggests that one author was Thölde, but that others were involved. Thölde published the first five books under Valentine's name.

Whoever he was, Basil Valentine had considerable knowledge of chemistry. He demonstrated that ammonia could be obtained by the action of alkali on sal-ammoniac (ammonium chloride), described the production of hydrochloric acid by acidifying brine of common salt (sodium chloride), and created ethyl chloride and oil of vitriol (sulfuric acid), among other achievements.

== The Twelve Keys of Basil Valentine ==
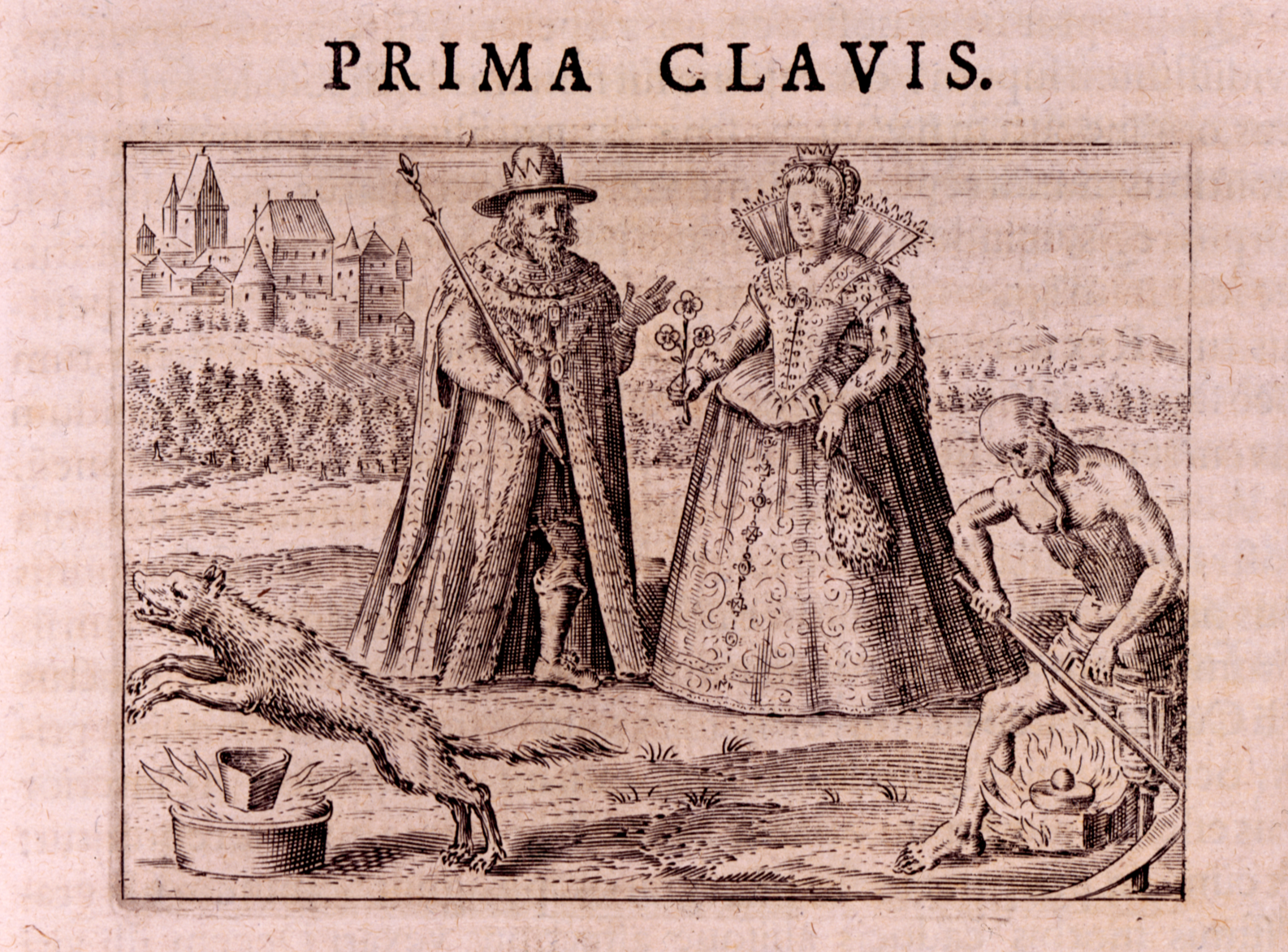
Illustration of the first key

The Twelve Keys of Basil Valentine is a widely reproduced alchemical book attributed to Valentine, first published in 1599 by Johann Thölde. It contains two parts, the second of which houses the twelve keys which was accompanied by woodcut engravings from later publications in the early seventeenth century.

== Selected publications ==
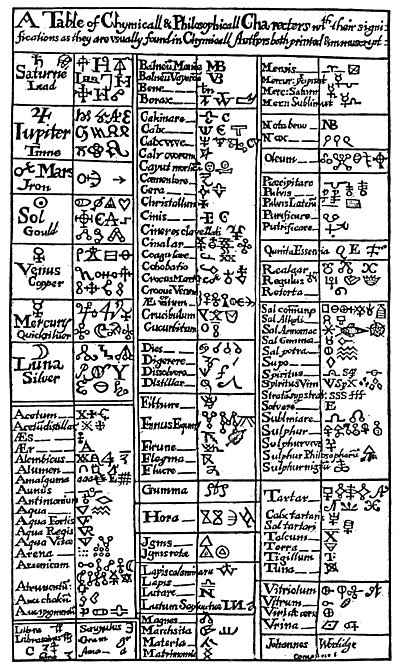
Table of alchemical symbols, from an English translation of his Last Will and Testament, 1671

Numerous publications on alchemy in Latin and German were published under the name Basil Valentine. They have been translated into many European languages, including English, French, Russian and others. The following list is roughly organized in order of translation or publication date.

- Ein kurtz summarischer Tractat, von dem grossen Stein der Uralten..., (Of the great stone of the ancients), by Basilius Valentinus. Eisleben: 1599 (without illustrations) (German)
- Ein kurtz summarischer Tractat, von dem grossen Stein der Uralten..., Leipzig: 1602 (with woodcuts) (German)
- Triumph Wagen Antimonii, (The Triumphant Chariot of Antimony) by Basil Valentine; Johannes Isaaci Hollandus; Joachim Tank; Georg Phaedro; Roger Bacon. Leipzig : In Verlegung Jacob Apels, 1604. (German)
- De microcosmo deque magno mundi mysterio, et medicina hominis, (Of the microcosm, of the great secrecy of the world, and the human medicine), by Basilius Valentinus; Wolfgang Ketzel; Raphael Eglinus. Marpurgi : typis Guolgangi Kezelii, 1609. (Latin)
- A Latin translation of the text of Ein kurtz summarischer Tractat as Tripus Aureus, hoc est, Tres Tractatus Chymici Selectissimi, nempe I. Basilii Valentini...Practica una cum 12 clavibus & appendice, ex Germanico, Michael Maier (editor), Frankfurt: Paul Jacob for Lucas Jennis, 1618. (with engravings of the 12 keys) (Latin)
- Azoth, ou le moyen de faire l'or caché des philosophes, de frère Basile Valentin by Basilius Valentinus; Christofle Perier; Jeremie Perier. (French) Paris: Chez Ieremie & Christofle Perier, au Palais, MDCXXIV 1624. (French)
- Les dovze clefs de philosophie de Frere Basile Valentin ... Traictant de la vraye medecine matalique. Plus l'Azoth, ou Le moyen de faire l'or chaché des philosophes. Tradvction francoise. by Basilius Valentinus. Paris, Chez Ieremie et Christophle Perier, 1624. (French)
- Fratris Basilii Valentini,... letztes Testament und Offenbahrung der himmlischen und virdischen Geheimnüss, so in einem Altar gefunden, in fünff Bücher abgetheilet... zuvor nie in Druck aussgangen, jetzt aber... publiciret durch Georgium Claromontanum,... by Basile Valentin; Georg Hellberger dit Georgius Claromontanus. Iena : H. Eyrings und J. Perferts Erben, 1626. (German)
- Revelation des mysteres des teintures essentieles des sept metaux et de leurs vertus médicinales... by Basile Valentin; translated by Jean Israël. Paris : J. De Senlecque et J. Hénault, 1645. (French)
- Currus triumphalis antimonii : opus antiquioris medicinae et philosophiae hermeticae studiosis dicat, by Basilius Valentinus. Tolosae : Apud Petrum Bosc, 1646. (The triumphal chariot of antimony) (Latin)
- Le char triomphal de l'antimoine, translation by Sauvin, François, 17th century (1646), introduction by Sylvain Matton; préface by Joachim Tancky. Editions Retz, 1977, 254 p. (French)
- Les livres secrets et le dernier testament de frere Basile Valentin Benedictin, de la grande pierre des anciens philosophes et autres mysteres cachés de la nature. Le tout tiré et transcrit de l'original trouvé dans le haut autel sous une petite table de marbre a Erfurt et mis en lumiere ou imprimé a línstante priere des enfans de la science ... by Basilius Valentinus. (French) Strasbourg: 1651. (French)
- Les douze clefs de philosophie de frere Basile Valentin ... : traictant de la vraye medecine metalique : plus l'Azoth, ou, Le moyen de faire l'or caché des philosophes : traduction francoise. Basilius Valentinus.; Jean Gobille; Clovis Hesteau Nuisement, sieur de. Paris : Chez Pierre Moët ..., 1660. (French)
- Of natural and supernatural things : also, of the first tincture, root, and spirit of metals and minerals by Basilius Valentinus. London : Printed, and are to be sold by Moses Pitt, 1670. (English)
- The last will and testament of Basil Valentine, monke of the order of St. Bennet, by Basil Valentine; translated by John Worlidge. London : Printed by S.G. and B.G. for Edward Brewster, 1671. (English)
- Chymische Schrifften by Basilius Valentinus. Hamburg: 1677. (German)
- Compendium veritatis philosophicum fratis Basilii Valentini Manuscript (Ms.180), 1780. (German)
- Les douze clefs de la philosophie. Eugène Canseliet, translator. Paris, Éditions de Minuit, 1956, 264 p. (French)
- Révélations des mystères des teintures des sept métaux, Pierre Savoret, editor. Omnium littéraire, 1976. (French)
- Le dernier testament de Basile Valentin : livres I, II, III, IV et V, dans lequel sont montrées les mines, l'origine d'icelles, leurs natures et propriétés... by Basile Valentin; edited by Joseph Castelli. Montélimar : Castelli, 2008. (French)
- Las doce llaves de la filosofía by Basilius Valentinus. Barcelona: Muñoz Moya y Montraveta, 1986. (Spanish)

== See also ==
- List of Catholic clergy scientists
