= George Ripley (alchemist) =

English alchemist (c. 1415–1490)

Sir George Ripley
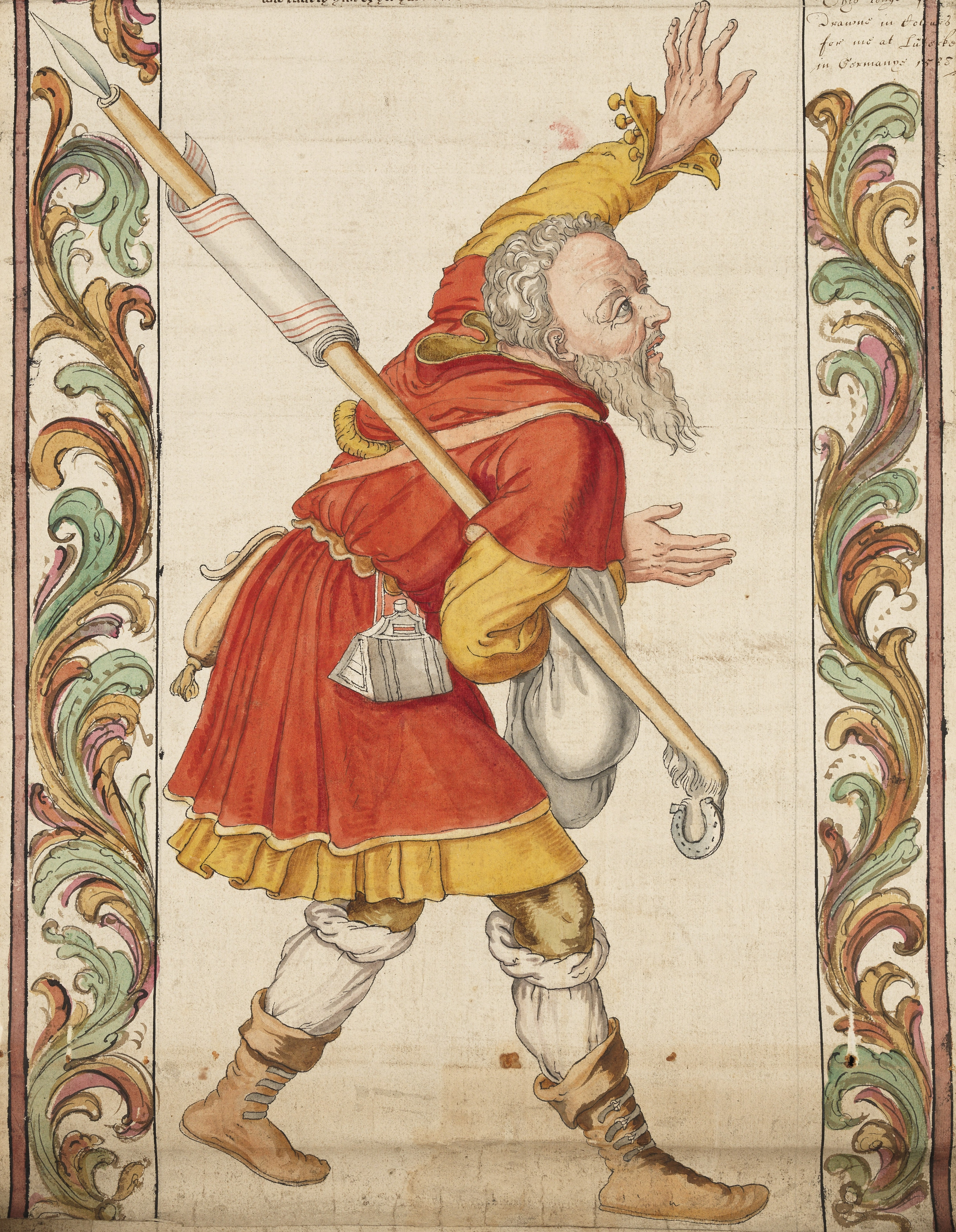
- Ripley, as illustrated in a 16th-century edition of the Ripley Scroll
- Born: c. 1415; Kingdom of England
- Died: 1490 (aged 74–75)

Philosophical work
- Main interests: Alchemy
- Notable works: The Compound of Alchemy, Cantilena Riplaei, The Ripley Scroll (disputed)

Sir George Ripley (c. 1415–1490) was an English Augustinian canon, author, and alchemist.

== Biography ==
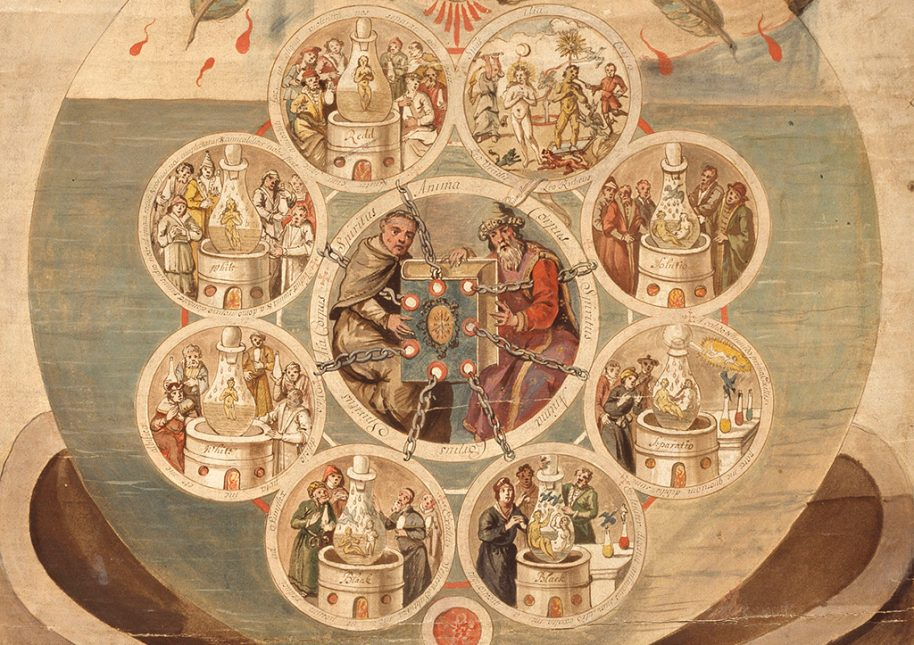
Alchemists Revealing Secrets from the Book of Seven Seals, The Ripley Scroll, detail

George Ripley was one of England's most famous alchemists. His alchemical writings attracted attention not only when they were published in the fifteenth century, but also later in the sixteenth and seventeenth centuries. His writings were studied by noted figures such as the alchemist John Dee, Robert Boyle (who is considered to be the first modern chemist), and even Isaac Newton.

A great deal of myth has grown up around Ripley, such as that he studied in Italy for twenty years and became a favourite of Pope Innocent VIII. He did however spend a number of years on the continent, and after his return to England he wrote his work The Compound of Alchemy; or, the Twelve Gates leading to the Discovery of the Philosopher's Stone (Liber Duodecim Portarum) in 1471. The Cantilena Riplaei is one of the first poetic compositions on the subject of alchemy. Most of Ripley's work is based on the work of pseudo-Ramon Lull, although The Compound of Alchemy is based largely on the work of a little-known alchemist of the fifteenth century, named Guido de Montanor.

Another story about him is reported by Thomas Fuller in his Worthies of England, which describes a reputable English gentleman who reported having seen a record in the island of Malta which stated that Ripley gave the enormous sum of one hundred thousand pounds sterling annually to the Knights of that island and of Rhodes to support their war against the Turks.

Ripley is known as the "Canon of Bridlington". He spent his later years as an anchorite near Boston (Yorkshire).

== The Wheel ==
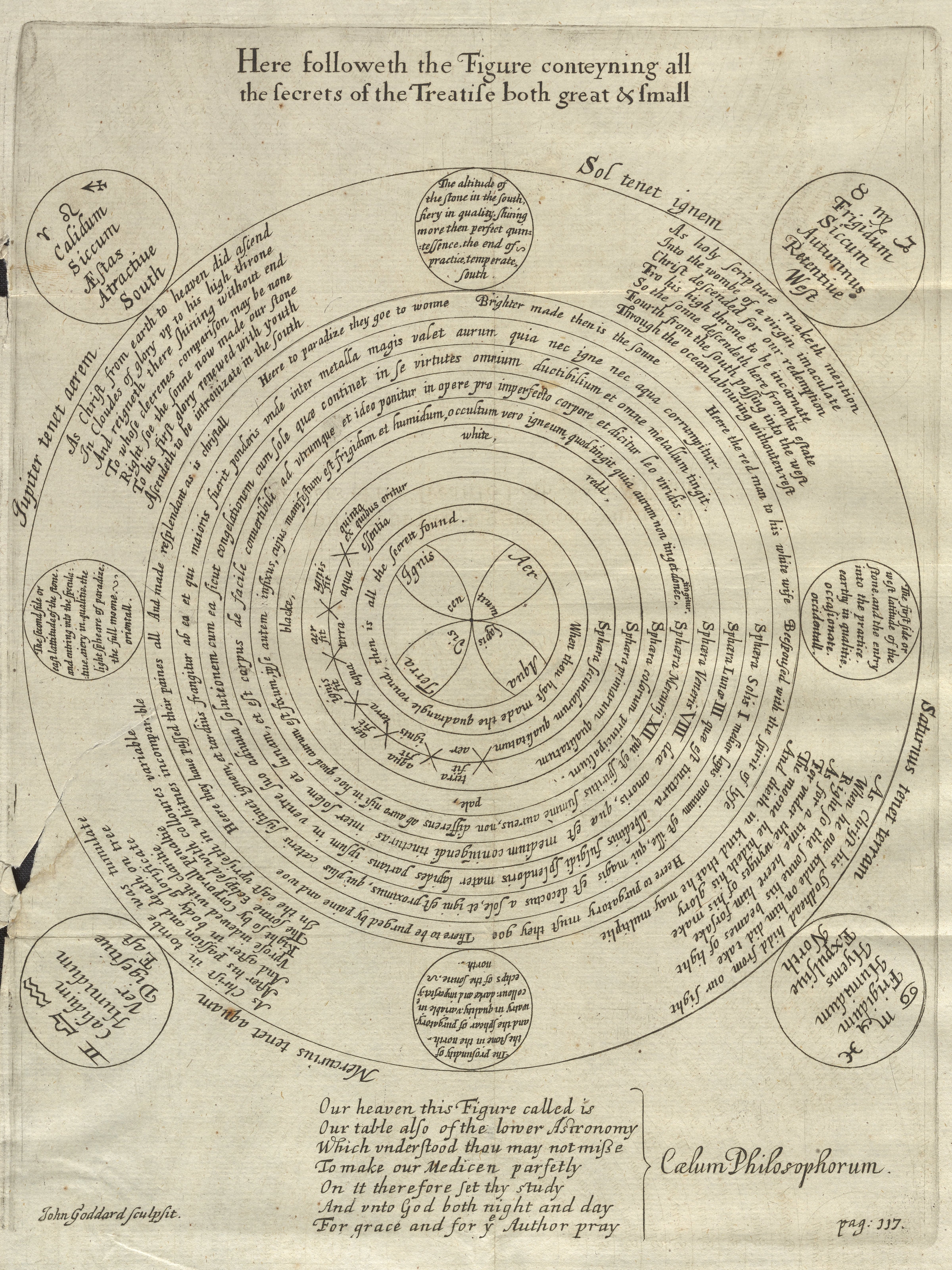
George Ripley's Wheel, by Elias Ashmole, 1652

Some scholars claim that the writings of The Compound of Alchemy were meant to be read in light of an alchemical drawing done by Ripley called the Wheel. This drawing is in essence an analogy of the planets of the Solar System, of which at the time, Earth was considered to be the centre. Ripley encoded his alchemical recipes into this drawing, depicting them as the planets which revolved around the Earth, or, more specifically, the elements of his work. In alchemy, there is often an analogical connection made between heaven and Earth, and this connection is symbolised by the use of the seven planetary symbols: Sol (Sun), Luna (Moon), Mercurius (Mercury), Venus, Mars, Jupiter, and Saturn. These planets correspond respectively to gold, silver, quicksilver, copper, iron, tin, and lead.

== The Vision of Sir George Ripley ==
A commentary upon Ripley's works was written in a series of treatises by the English alchemist Eirenaeus Philalethes. Ripley's Vision, written in the Twelve Gates, became the subject of an exposition by Eirenaeus published in 1677 in London. The English form of the Vision gives a fair sample of the allusive style.

When busie at my Book I was upon a certain Night,
This Vision here exprest appear'd unto my dimmed sight:
A Toad full Ruddy I saw, did drink the juice of Grapes so fast,
Till over-charged with the broth, his Bowels all to-brast:
And after that, from poyson'd Bulk he cast his Venom fell,
For Grief and Pain whereof his Members all began to swell;
With drops of Poysoned sweat approaching thus his secret Den,
His Cave with blasts of fumous Air he all bewhited then:
And from the which in space a Golden Humour did ensue,
Whose falling drops from high did stain the soil with ruddy hue.... (etc.)

== The "Ripley Scroll" ==
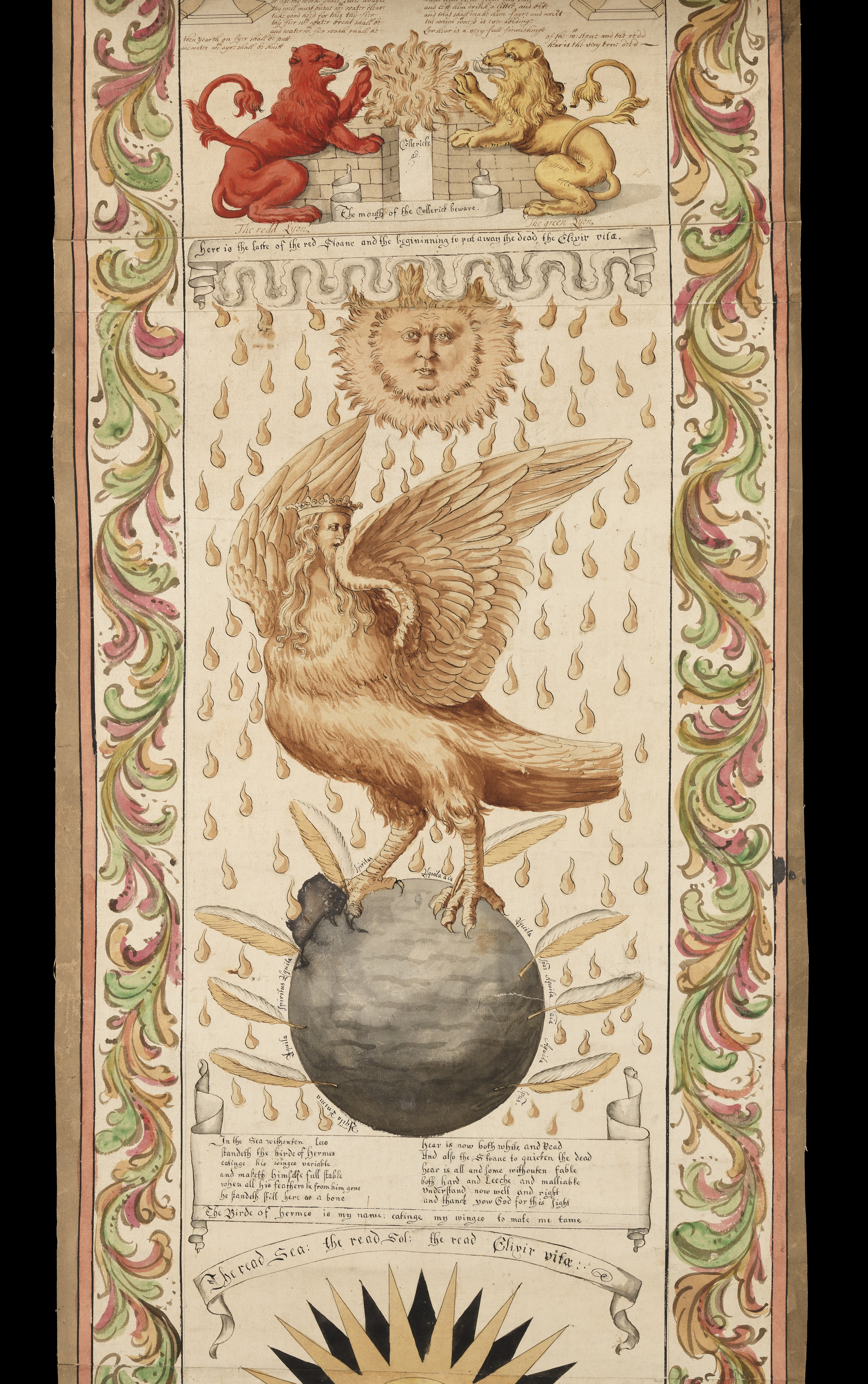
An excerpt from a copy of the Ripley Scroll

There are approximately 23 copies of the Ripley Scroll in existence. The scrolls range in size, colour, and detail but are all variations on a lost 15th-century original. Although they are named after George Ripley, there is no evidence that Ripley designed the scrolls himself. They are called Ripley scrolls because some of them include poetry associated with the alchemist. The scrolls' images are symbolic references to the philosopher's stone.

- London, British Library, Add MS 5025 (Alchemical scrolls), Four scrolls are drawn in Lubeck 1588.
- London, Science Museum, A21950, 18th century.
- London, Wellcome Institute, 692 & 693, two scrolls 16th century.
- Cambridge, Fitzwilliam Museum, MS 276, 16th century.
- ref. also a version of Ripley Scrowle by James Standysh, 16th century, British Library, Add MS 32621.
- Oxford, Bodleian Library MS Bodl Rolls 1 | Alchemical Roll
- Oxford, Bodleian Library MS Ash. Rolls 40 | Alchemical Roll
- Oxford, Bodleian Library MS Ash. Rolls 52 | Alchemical Roll
- Oxford, Bodleian Library MS Ash. Rolls 53 | Alchemical Roll

== Canonical works ==
- George Ripley, Cantilena Riplaei
- George Ripley, Opera omnia chemica. Kassel, 1649.
- George Ripley, Liber duodecim portarum, also contained in J.J. Mangetus, Bibliotheca Chemica Curiosa (Geneva 1702), Vol. II, pp 275–285.
- Aeyrenaeus Philalethus, Ripley Reviv'd; or, An Exposition upon Sir George Ripley's Hermetico-Poetical Works (London 1678).
