= Where Wicked Muhammad Came From =

Where Wicked Muhammad Came From (Latin: Qualiter iniquus Mahometus venit) is an anonymous Latin biography of Muhammad from the late 13th century. Although it contains some authentic Islamic elements, it consists mostly of legendary material or reworkings intended to ridicule and denounce Islam and its founder.

== Title ==
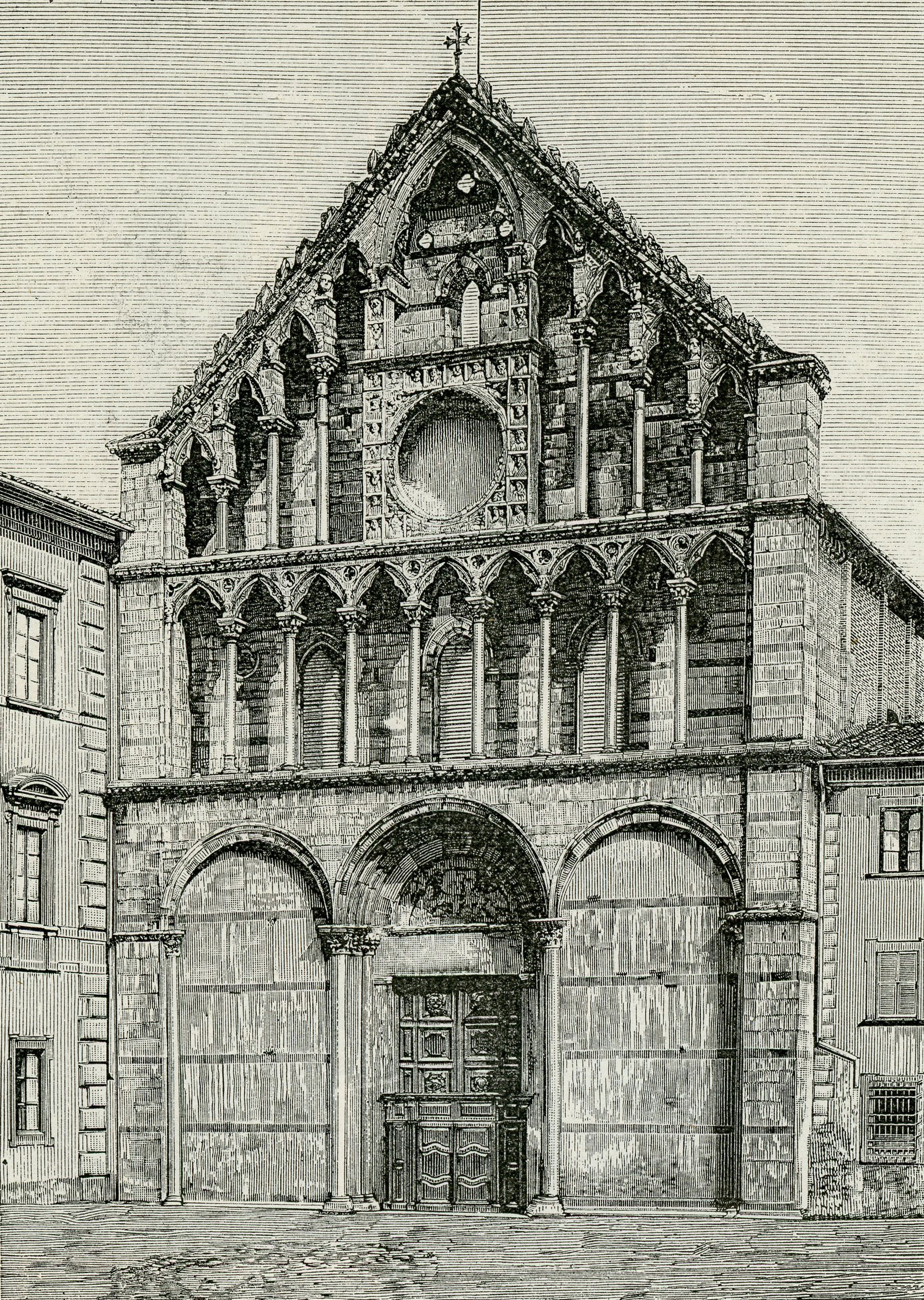
Church of Santa Caterina, where the only manuscript of Wicked Muhammad is kept

In the single manuscript copy of the work, it begins with the incipit:

Hic incipit qualiter iniquus Mahometus venit et a quibus et quo modo processit.

Here begins the account of where wicked Muhammad came from and among whom and how he rose to prominence.

In the introduction to their Latin edition and English translation, Julian Yolles and Jessica Weiss refer to the text as Where Wicked Muhammad Came From, or Qualiter for short. Using a different part of the incipit for a short title, John Tolan calls it Iniquus Mahometus ('deceitful Muḥammad'). Fernando González Muñoz calls it the Vita Mahometi ('life of Muhammad') of the Pisan manuscript, while others simply identify it as the "Pisan manuscript" or "Pisan text".

== Synopsis ==
In the days of the apostles there was a man by the name of Nicolas, who was false and wicked in every way; nonetheless, he was one of the seven deacons, just as the traitor Judas had been one of Christ's disciples.

Nicolas sought to succeed Pope Clement I. Failing this, he tried to avenge himself on the church by preaching that wives and property should be held in common. He was excommunicated as a heretic and imprisoned in a tower, where he died of hunger and thirst. He had a disciple, called Maurus "both by name and ethnicity" (i.e., a Moor), to whom he taught necromancy and multiple languages. Maurus fled Rome by ship for Arabia after his master's arrest. There he took up residence as a hermit on a mountain beside a city that had recently converted to Christianity.

In order to effect his master's vengeance, Maurus recruited a young camelherd named Muhammad, promising to make him a king. He taught him black arts, multiple languages and the doctrines of Nicolas. He devised a series of ruses to convince the townspeople to make Muhammad king. Two calves were trained to eat from Muhammad's hand and a dove to eat grain from his ear. When the king of the city died some years later, the people sought the advice of the hermit as to whether they should continue in their new faith. Maurus made it appear that Muhammad could tame a wild bull and bring forth water from the ground. Muhammad was elected king.

Maurus and Muhammad then wrote a book of doctrine enjoining circumcision, ablution, polygamy, sodomy and Friday prayers while forbidding belief in the Trinity. At first, there were no dietary restrictions. The book was then laid in Muhammad's lap by the other tamed bull while the dove appeared on his shoulder as if a messenger from God for its interpretation. Following these ruses, Muhammad was seized by convulsions during which he uttered prophecies under demonic influence. This was how he usually prophesied. It was during one of these episodes that he described his ascension to heaven.

At first, Muhammad permitted Christians and Jews to live in a separate quarter in the same city, but as the power of his followers grew he began to initiate wars against his neighbours. He was increasingly given over to lust, having sexual relations with both boys and girls of all faiths, relationships he often disguised with the claim that he was in heaven speaking with God. He was finally murdered by the family of a Jewish woman who refused his advances. His body was fed to pigs, but his left foot was preserved. The woman claimed that he was taken up to heaven by angels, but that she tugged on his foot until they decided to leave it behind. His followers built the Kaaba to house his foot and they visit it every year on the Hajj. On account of these events, Muslims curse Jews and refuse to eat pork.

And this is how the wicked sect of the descendants of Ishmael was invented through the agency of the devil. Here ends the evil life, that is, of the Saracens, which was created through the agency of the devil.

== Analysis ==
Wicked Muhammad is a polemical anti-Islamic work containing a mix of outrageous legends and "some knowledge of Muslim practice". It is of interest primarily for the original way its author has weaved together various strands of Muhammad traditions current in western Europe into a coherent narrative. The figure of Nicholas was commonly associated, even identified, with Muhammad in western accounts. He was usually (and anachronistically) considered the same person as Nicholas of Antioch, who was in turn identified as the founder of the Nicolaitans. Wicked Muhammad's treatment of the figure is unique, as is the introduction of the intermediary Maurus.

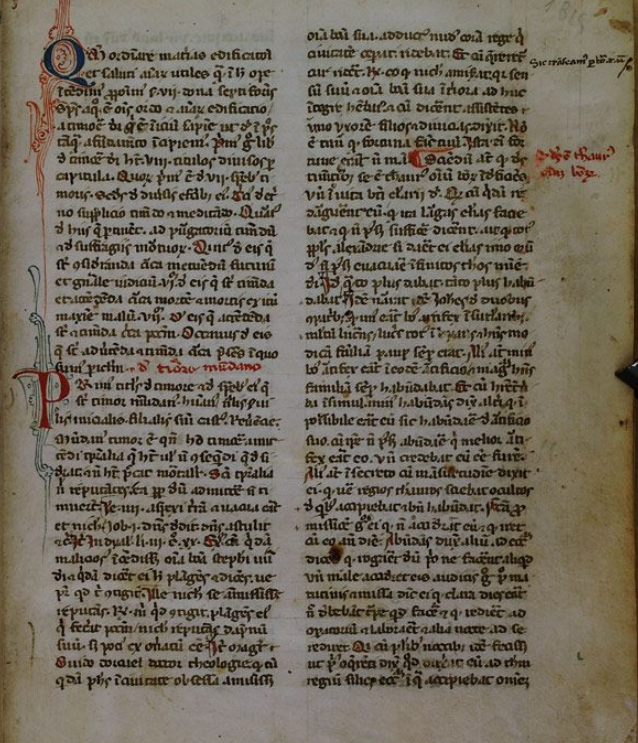
First page of the manuscript. The text of Wicked Muhammad starts at folio 81v.

Wicked Muhammad is also unique incorporating both tales of the bulls. In the Vita Mahumeti of Embrico of Mainz, Muhammad overcomes the bull to succeed to the kingdom, while in the works of Walter of Compiègne, Guibert of Nogent, Adelphus, Vincent of Beauvais and Thomas of Pavia, the bull deposits the Qur'an in Muhammad's lap. In Wicked Muhammad, there are two bulls and both episodes occur.

The Islamic story of the splitting of the Moon became, in certain popular traditions, an account of how the Moon entered one of Muhammad's sleeves and passed out the other. This version is found in Wicked Muhammad and, uniquely, takes place during Muhammad's ascension.

Wicked Muhammad was not a popular or influential text, but it was used by Pedro Pascual.

== Manuscript and sources ==
Wicked Muhammad is known from a single copy, now manuscript 50 in the Biblioteca Cateriniana del Seminario Arcivescovile in Pisa. It formerly belonged to the Dominican convent of Santa Caterina in Pisa. The manuscript probably dates from the late 14th or early 15th century, although the biography was written earlier, probably in the last quarter of the 13th century.

The story of Muhammad's night journey and ascension points to an Iberian origin, since this story was well known there by the 13th century through a variety of texts, including the Liber denudationis, the Vita Mahometi of Uncastillo, the Historia Arabum of Rodrigo Jiménez de Rada and the Primera Crónica General. After 1264, however, the Book of Muhammad's Ladder, compiled in Iberia, made the story more widely known beyond the Pyrenees. On the basis of internal evidence, González Muñoz concludes that the text was probably composed outside of Iberia.

== Bibliography ==
- Brown, Jonathan A. C. (2011). Muhammad: A Very Short Introduction. Oxford University Press.
- Daniel, Norman (1980). Islam and the West: The Making of an Image. Edinburgh University Press.
- González Muñoz, Fernando (2006). "Dos versiones tardías de la leyenda de Mahoma: la Vita Mahometi del ms. Pisa, Biblioteca del Seminario 50 y el tratado Sobre la seta mahometana de Pedro de Jaén". In A. A. Nascimento; P. F. Alberto (eds.). Actas do IV Congresso Internacional de Latim Medieval Hispánico. Lisbon: Centro de Estudos Clássicos. pp. 591–598.
- Tolan, John (2008). Sons of Ishmael: Muslims Through European Eyes in the Middle Ages. University Press of Florida.
- Tolan, John (2012). "Iniquus Mohametus". In David Thomas; Alex Mallett (eds.). Christian–Muslim Relations: A Bibliographical History. Vol. 4 (1200–1350). Brill. pp. 654–656.
- Yolles, Julian; Weiss, Jessica, eds. (2018). Medieval Latin Lives of Muhammad. Harvard University Press.
