= Metellus =

Metellus may refer to:

== Cognomina ==
- Metellus, a cognomen of the gens Caecilia, an ancient Roman family
  - For their family tree, see Caecilii Metelli family tree
- Hugo Metellus (died c. 1150), Augustinian canon and poet
- Metellus of Tegernsee (fl. c. 1167), German monk and writer

== Surname ==
- Alain Metellus (born 1965), American-Canadian track-and-field athlete
- Jean Métellus (1937–2014), Haitian neurologist, poet, novelist and playwright
- Josh Metellus (born 1998), American professional football player
- Philippe Metellus (born 1990), Haitian-Canadian judoka

== Other ==
- Metellus a synonym for the beetle genus Taumacera

== See also ==
- Caecilius Metellus (disambiguation)
- Lucius Caecilius Metellus (disambiguation)
- Marcus Caecilius Metellus (disambiguation)
- Quintus Caecilius Metellus (disambiguation)
