= Vita Mahometi =

Vita Mahometi or Vita Machometi (Latin for 'life of Muhammad') may refer to:

- Vita Mahumeti of Embrico of Mainz (late 11th century)
- Vita Machometi (Adelphus) (12th century)
- Vita Mahometi (Uncastillo) (early 13th century)
- Vita Machometi (Pisa), better known as Where Wicked Muhammad Came From (late 13th century)
- Vita Machometi, published name of George Hermonymus' translation of George Hamartolos' passage on Muhammad

== See also ==
- Latin biographies of Muhammad
