= Embricho (bishop of Würzburg) =

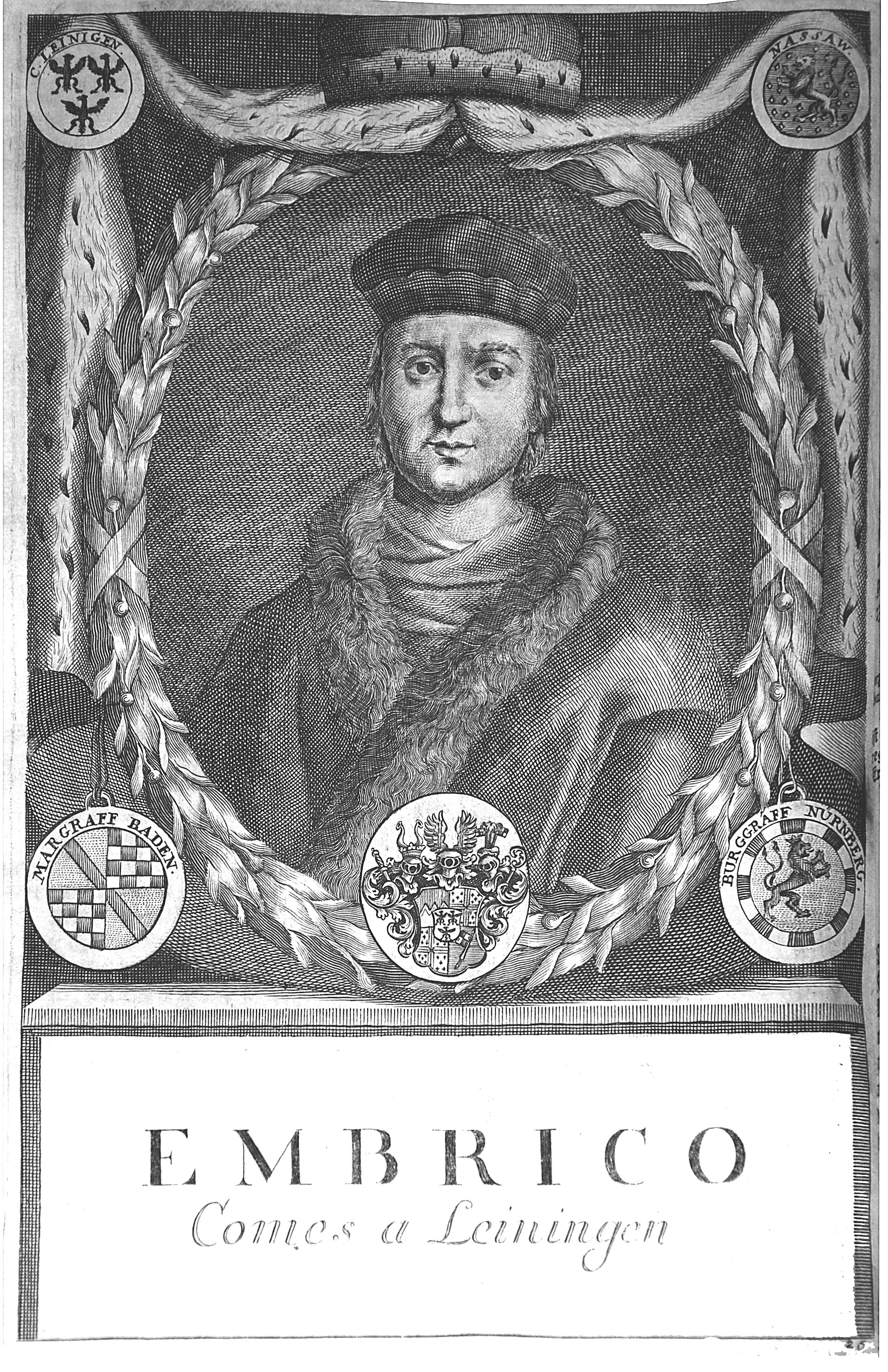
Embricho portrait

Embricho (died November 1146) was the bishop of Würzburg from 1127 until his death. He served as chancellor under King Lothair III from 1125 to 1127. He died while returning from a diplomatic mission to the Byzantine Empire. He has left some short writings in Latin.

== Life ==
Embricho was born into a noble family, probably from Rhenish Franconia. Ever since Lorenz Fries in the 16th century, he has been called the count of Leiningen, but this is an error. He was probably educated in Toul Cathedral, where he was a classmate of Hugh Metel. From 1118 until 1127, he was the provost of Erfurt Cathedral. From 1125, he served King Lothair III as chancellor. Lothair appointed him to succeed the deposed Bishop Gebhard of Henneberg in December 1127. He became the first bishop of Würzburg to use the title duke, which appears (as Latin dux) on his coins. It is uncertain, however, if he was invested with the duchy of East Franconia by Lothair. In a letter written shortly after Emicho's appointment, Hugh Metel praises his intellectual capabilities.

Embricho was a regular presence at Lothair's court. Nevertheless, he paid close attention to his diocese, initiating its division into archdeaconries and rural chapters. In 1128, he issued a diploma confirming the shoemakers' guild. He held regular diocesan synods. At a synod in 1128, Embricho granted land to the new Praemonstratensian monastery of Oberzell in exchange for a vineyard at Stenbach and a house in Würzburg. The synod of 1 May 1136 created a new parish. At the synod of 5 May 1137, Embricho granted to the Cistercian monastery of Ebrach land at Alolvesheim which had previously been made over by Count Gebhard of Sulzbach. He also helped found the Cistercian house of Wechterswinkel.

After 1137, Embricho was one of the closest advisors of King Conrad III. The abbey of Saint James was founded outside Würzburg during his episcopate and he consecrated its church, perhaps in 1138. Under him, the architect Enzelin constructed the first stone bridge over the Main River and rebuilt the nave of Würzburg Cathedral. At a diocesan synod on 18 October 1144, he turned over the tithes of Erlebach and Haselach to the monastery of Heilsbronn in exchange for the parish church of Haselach. In 1145, he escorted Conrad's sister-in-law, Bertha of Sulzbach, to Constantinople to marry the Emperor Manuel I. He died at Aquileia while returning home.

== Works ==
Two works by Embricho are known. In 1139, he delivered a eulogy (laudatio funebris) at the funeral of Otto of Bamberg, a key figure in the Pomeranian mission. Late in life, he wrote his Confessio Imbriconis episcopi Wirzburgensis, a highly personal work. It is 102 lines of leonine hexameters. The poem expresses lament, repentance and fear of God for past sins and shortcomings.

It was first suggested by Valentin Rose that Embricho may be the same person as the Embrico of Mainz who authored a Latin biography of Muhammad in leonine hexameters while a student around the year 1100. Several similarities between the Confessio and the Vita Mahumeti (Life of Muhammad) have been raised in evidence.

== Works cited ==
- González Muñoz, Fernando (2015). Mahometrica: ficciones poéticas latinas del siglo XII sobre Mahoma. Consejo Superior de Investigaciones Científicas.
- Mews, Constant J.; Heikkinen, Seppo, eds. (2025). The Letters of Hugh Metel. Boydell and Brewer. doi:10.1515/9781837650927. ISBN 978-1-83765-092-7.
- Pixton, Paul B. (1995). The German Episcopacy and the Implementation of the Decrees of the Fourth Lateran Council, 1216–1245: Watchmen on the Tower. E. J. Brill. ISBN 9789004102620.
- Roche, Jason T (2021). The Crusade of King Conrad III of Germany: Warfare and Diplomacy in Byzantium, Anatolia and Outremer, 1146–1149. Brepols. ISBN 978-2-503-53038-3. OCLC 1252629980.
- Wendehorst, Alfred (1959). "Embricho". Neue Deutsche Biographie (in German). Vol. 4. Berlin: Duncker & Humblot. pp. 474–474. (full text online).
