= Book of Muhammad's Ladder =

Account of Muhammad's Israʾ and Miʿraj

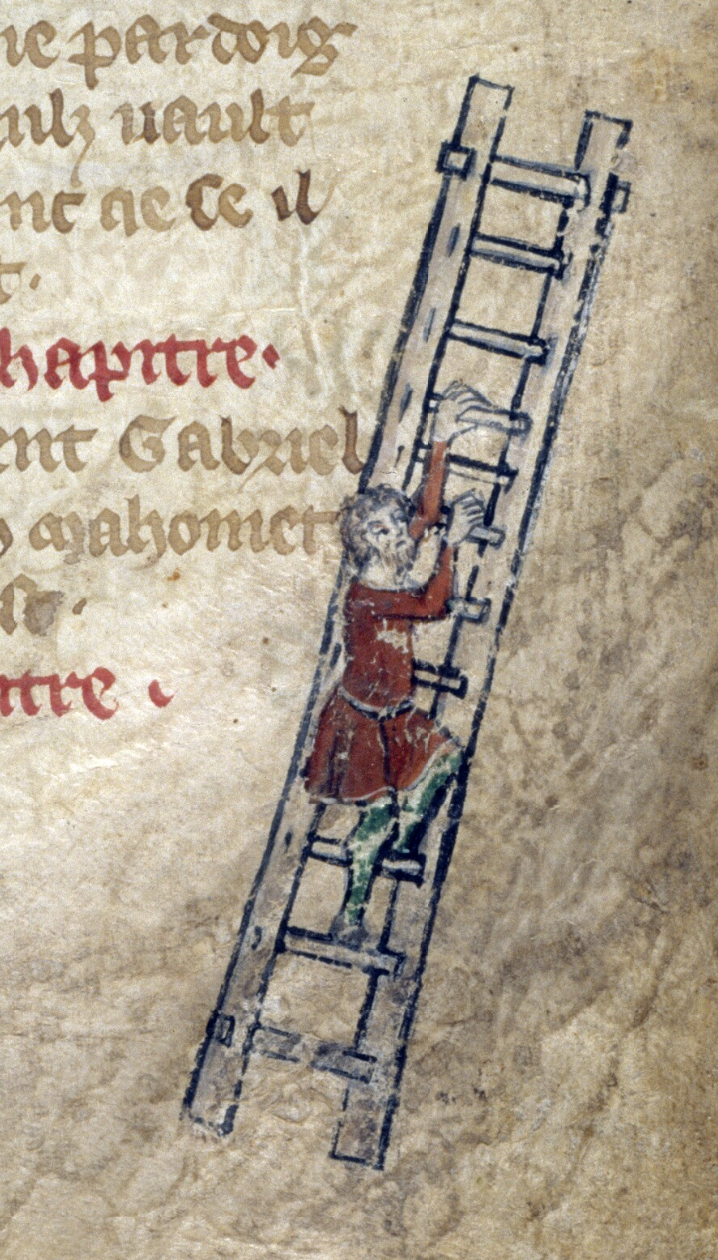
Illustration of Muḥammad on a ladder, from the sole copy of the Livre de l'eschiele Mahomet

The Book of Muḥammad's Ladder is a first-person account of the Islamic prophet Muḥammad's night journey (isrāʾ) and ascent to heaven (miʿrāj), translated into Latin (as Liber scalae Machometi) and Old French (as Livre de l'eschiele Mahomet) from traditional Arabic materials. Although presented as Muḥammad's words and purportedly recorded by Muḥammad's cousin Ibn ʿAbbās (died 687), the work is in fact spurious and dates to the 13th century.

Belonging to the genre of apocalyptic literature, Muḥammad's Ladder details Muḥammad's miraculous transportation by the angel Gabriel from Mecca to the Temple Mount in Jerusalem and from there upward to the seven heavens. It also includes sections on Muḥammad's visit to the seven regions of Hell and his face-to-face vision of God, during which he was granted the power to intercede on behalf of believers on Judgement Day.

The work was known to Dante Alighieri (died 1321), whose Divine Comedy has sometimes been regarded as inspired by Muḥammad's Ladder.

== Origins ==
Muḥammad's Ladder has a complicated history. It survives only in Latin and Old French versions, known respectively by the titles Liber scalae Machometi and Livre de l'eschiele Mahomet. According to the preface of these versions, King Alfonso X of Castile commissioned Abraham of Toledo to translate an Arabic work entitled al-Miʿrāj into Castilian (Old Spanish) and divide it into chapters. According to the French preface, Alfonso X also commissioned Bonaventura da Siena to translate the Castilian into Latin and French. A colophon indicates that he completed the French translation in 1264. The Castilian version, now for the most part lost, was probably produced before 1262.

Doubts have been raised about the ascription of the French translation to Alfonso X and Bonaventura. It has been argued that the French translation was made from the Latin shortly after 1264 by a translator from Provence and probably not on Alfonso X's orders. It has also been argued to the contrary that the French translation is earlier than the Latin.

== Sources ==
There is debate about the nature of the Arabic original with which Abraham of Toledo worked. No Arabic text corresponding to Muḥammad's Ladder is known. It may be that the Arabic work was a compilation of ḥadīths on the isrāʾ and miʿrāj made expressly for the purpose of translating. Given the possible reworking of sources, the work may to a certain extent be regarded as an original composition by Abraham of Toledo. In addition, the surviving texts seem to incorporate material from Christian commentaries on Islamic traditions, possibly added by Bonaventura. On the other hand, it has been argued that the original Arabic compilation was the work of a Muslim, since it depends on orthodox Muslim sources, including the Qurʾān and Qurʾānic commentaries. The influence of Christian (and Jewish) commentaries may be explained by the author's reliance on popular traditions and less authoritative ḥadīths, which had already incorporated such material. There is little doubt that the text of Muḥammad's Ladder as it stands is a composite work.

Ana Echevarría identifies three Arabic Islamic texts that "certainly had a share in the making up" Muḥammad's Ladder. These were Ibn Hishām's edition of Ibn Isḥāq's Sīra from around 828; al-Ṭabarī's Tafsīr from around 861; and the Kitāb shajarat al-yaqīn of al-Ashʿarī (died 936). To these Frederick Colby adds the miʿrāj account attributed to Abū al-Ḥasan Bakrī. Another Arabic source, the Kitāb al-wāḍiḥ bi-l-ḥaqq, was certainly available in 13th-century Spain. Another Arabic source that may have been available was the Kitāb al-miʿrāj of al-Qushayrī.

Early Latin biographies of Muḥammad do not incorporate the isrāʾ and miʿrāj. The first to do so was the Vita Mahometi of the early 13th century. Around the same time, Muḥammad's journeys were incorporated into the Chronica of Lucas de Tuy, the Historia arabum of Rodrigo Jiménez de Rada and Alfonso X's Estoria de España. Rodrigo's connection with Mark of Toledo suggests that the Arabic works on which Muḥammad's Ladder is based were available in Toledo in the first decades of the 13th century.

== Synopsis ==
By genre, Muḥammad's Ladder is an apocalypse. It consists of 85 chapters and can be divided into three sections. The first four chapters describe the isrāʾ or night journey when Muḥammad was brought from Mecca to the Temple Mount in Jerusalem by the angel Gabriel. His miʿrāj or ascent through the seven heavens by means of a ladder is the main subject and takes up chapters 5–79. This section includes Muḥammad's visit to the seven regions of Hell. It also includes Muḥammad's face-to-face visit with God and the grant to him of the power to intercede on behalf of believers on Judgement Day. At one point, Muḥammad says that God has created 18,000 parallel worlds. The final six chapters concern his return to Mecca and how he related his experience to his fellow Quraysh. Ibn ʿAbbās is said to have recorded Muḥammad's account.

== Manuscripts ==
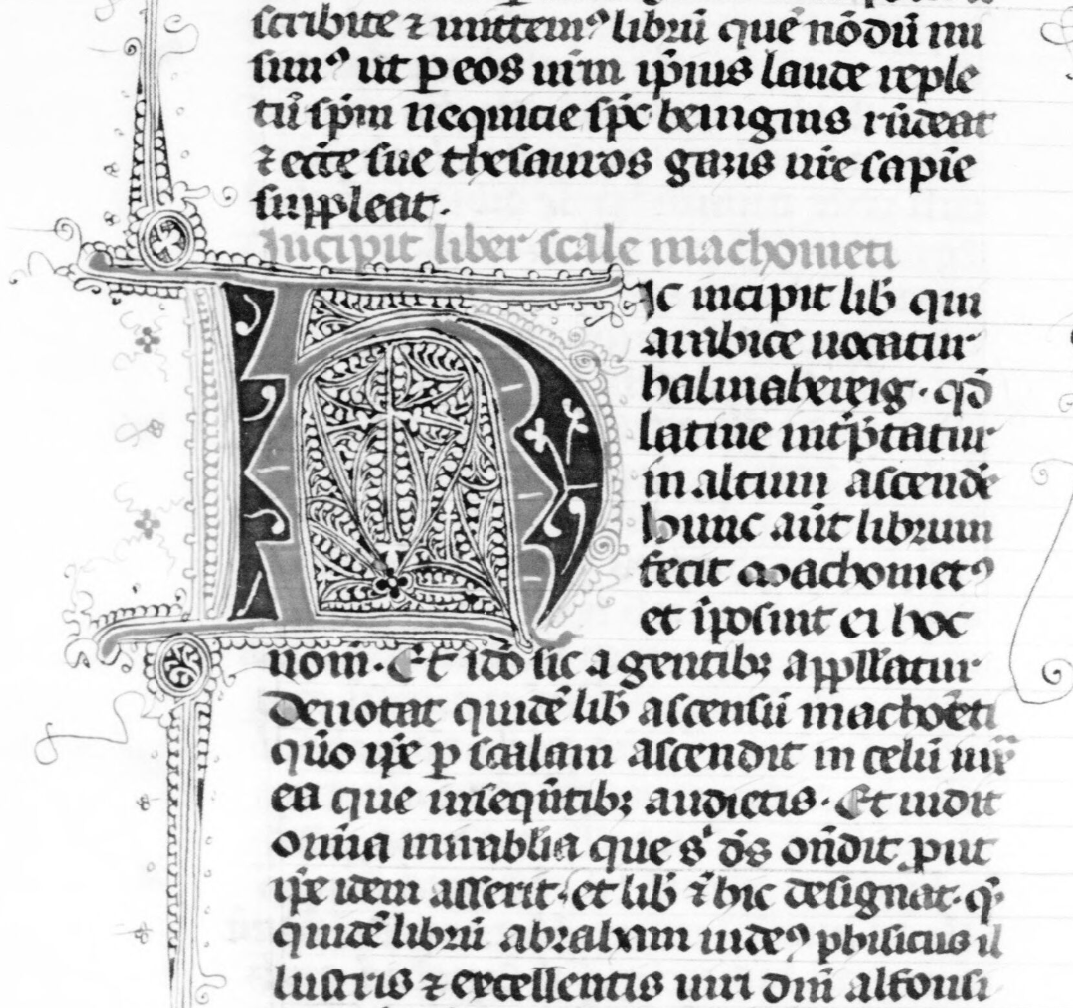
Decorated initial at the start of the Liber scalae Machometi in BnF lat. 6064

The Castilian version is lost, although some extracts may exist in a manuscript in the Escorial. Francisco Eiximenis (14th century) and Antonio de Torquemada (15th century) show knowledge of the Castilian version. It has been suggested that the Castilian version was only ever a draft, with the Latin product being the only one intended for publication. The Latin version survives in two manuscripts and the French in one. All the manuscripts date to the 13th century or 14th century:

- Vatican City, Biblioteca Apostolica Vaticana, Latin 4072
- Paris, Bibliothèque nationale de France, Latin 6064
- Oxford, Bodleian Library, Laud Misc. 537 (French)

There have been many editions and modern translations of the text.

== Legacy ==
Muḥammad's Ladder was almost certainly translated because it was believed to be a work of the greatest importance in Islam. It was taken by its translators to be an authentic record of Muḥammad's words. In the two Latin manuscripts, Muḥammad's Ladder is copied alongside the Toledan Collection, a group of 12th-century translations of authentic Muslim writings into Latin. It came to be regarded by Christians as Muḥammad's "second book" after the Qurʾān, a claim which denied the divine inspiration of either. The French preface makes clear that the reader is to perceive in the work "the errors and unbelievable things" of Islam. The response of Muḥammad's kinsmen to his account probably reflects how the translators expected the work to be received by Christian readers:

You wish to have us understand thereby that in a single night you went to the Temple in Jerusalem and saw everything that is within it and, afterwards, you saw all the heavens and all the lands and celestial gardens and regions of hell! ... And we know indeed that it is at the very least a month's journey from here all the way to the said temple! How, then, do you expect us to believe you regarding anything that you recounted to us?

Muḥammad's Ladder was known to Dante Alighieri (died 1321) and is directly cited, probably in the Latin version, by Fazio degli Uberti (died 1367) and Roberto Caracciolo da Lecce (c. 1490). In Western Europe, it was considered the second book of Islam after the Qurʾān down to the 15th century. It is cited as Muḥammad's second book in the Liber illustrium personarum of Juan Gil de Zamora (died c. 1318) and the Primera Crónica General. In 1907, Miguel Asín Palacios first proposed that it was a possible source for Dante's Divine Comedy. The extent of its influence on Dante has been heavily debated ever since. It has been argued that the Divine Comedy was composed as a kind of Christian counter to Muḥammad's Ladder, although there is as yet no scholarly consensus.

== Bibliography ==
- Cerulli, Enrico (1969). "Bonaventura da Siena". Dizionario Biografico degli Italiani (in Italian). Vol. 11: Boccadibue–Bonetti. Rome: Institute of the Italian Encyclopaedia. ISBN 978-88-12-00032-6.
- Colby, Frederick S. (2008). Narrating Muḥammad's Night Journey: Tracing the Development of the Ibn ʿAbbās Ascension Discourse. State University of New York.
- Echevarría, Ana (2005). "Eschatology or Biography? Alfonso X, Muhammad's Ladder and a Jewish Go-Between". In Leyla Rouhi; Cynthia Robinson (eds.). Under the Influence: Questioning the Comparative in Medieval Castile. Brill. pp. 133–152.
- Echevarría, Ana (2012). "Liber scalae Machometi". In David Thomas; Alex Mallett (eds.). Christian–Muslim Relations: A Bibliographical History. Vol. 4 (1200–1350). Brill. pp. 425–428.
- Hyatte, Reginald (1997). The Prophet of Islam in Old French: The Romance of Muhammad (1258) and The Book of Muhammad's Ladder (1264). Brill.
