= Quintus Caecilius Metellus Nepos =

Quintus Caecilius Metellus Nepos may refer to:

- Quintus Caecilius Metellus Nepos (consul 98 BC)
- Quintus Caecilius Metellus Nepos (consul 57 BC)

== See also ==
- Quintus Caecilius Metellus (disambiguation)
