= Kitab al-Miraj =

The Kitab al-Mi'raj (Arabic: كتاب المعراج "Book of the Ascension") is a book by al-Qushayri (died 1072) concerning the Miraj, that is, Muhammad's ascension into Heaven following his miraculous one-night journey from Mecca to Jerusalem. The book is divided into seven chapters, and was written in Arabic using the Naskh script.

In the second half of the 13th century, the book was translated into Latin (as Liber scalae Machometi) and Spanish (by Abraham of Toledo), and soon thereafter (in 1264 CE) into Old French. Its Islamic depictions of Hell are believed by some scholars to have been a major influence on Dante's Divine Comedy (completed in 1320), including Miguel Asín Palacios, and Enrico Cerulli .
