= Hugh Metel =

Hugh Metel (Latin: Hugo Metellus; c. 1080 – c. 1150) was an Augustinian canon and scholar known for his surviving collection of 55 letters plus several poems, all in Latin. He was a native of the Duchy of Lorraine in the Holy Roman Empire, where he spent most of his life, although he was educated in France.

Although Hugh's letters have at times "great documentary value", they have been judged "ridiculous ... in their mixture ... of fulsome flattery, self-glorification and unasked advice, all expressed in the most bombastic language". This widely-shared judgement is based largely on Hugh's two letters to Heloise. In the view of Constant Mews, a fuller analysis of his writings reveals him to have been a "imaginative and innovative writer".

== Life ==
Hugh was born in Toul. He claims in a letter to have been an adoptive brother of Albero de Montreuil, later archbishop of Trier. He probably obtained his primary education at the cathedral of Toul, where Odo of Tournai taught until about 1090. He later studied at the school of Chartres, where the future Bishop Embricho of Würzburg was one of his classmates. Hugh Farsit was probably one of his teachers. After a crisis of faith, he moved to the school of Laon to study under Anselm of Laon, who died in 1117.

After his studies, Hugh entered the abbey of canons regular of abbey of Saint-Léon in Toul, probably in the 1120s. He was still writing in the 1140s. In a letter addressed to Bishop Henry, he warned of the presence of heretics in the diocese of Toul. He claims that they "detest marriage, they abhor baptism, they mock the sacraments of the Church, they abhor the name of Christian." In 1143, Eberwin of Helfenstein wrote about a similar heretical sect in Cologne.

In his later letters, Hugh implies that he is in old age. His latest datable letter was written between 1145 and 1147 or 1148. No material in the manuscript that contains his letters—the production of which manuscript Hugh oversaw—can be definitely dated later than 1147.

== Works ==
=== MS Phillipps 1694 ===
Hugh's writings are preserved in a 12th-century manuscript, now in the Staatsbibliothek zu Berlin, Preussischer Kulturbesitz, Phillipps 1694. Hugh probably arranged the manuscript and may have copied the letters himself. The manuscript contains:

- Over 145 letters of Ivo of Chartres and the introduction to his Decretum
- Various letters of Anselm of Canterbury, Bruno of Reims and Bernard of Clairvaux
- Excerpts from the letters of Quintus Aurelius Symmachus
- Some saints' lives by Marbod of Rennes
- Aesop's fables in verse
- Bernard Sylvester, Cosmographia
- Embrico of Mainz: Vita Mahumeti
- Gibuin of Langres: Rithmus de paradiso
- Godfrey of Reims: Epistolarum liber
- Hildebert of Lavardin: De missae sacramentis et veteris legis, De Zosima et Maria Egyptiacae and letters
- Many poems that are anonymous or of uncertain authorship

=== Letters ===
The collection of 55 of Hugh's letters forms the second last section of the manuscript Phillipps 1694, at folios 139ra–185rb. It begins with a lengthy letter to Bernard of Clairvaux. Among others to whom Hugh wrote are:

- Albero de Montreuil
- College of Cardinals
- Embricho von Leiningen
- Fulco, abbot of Épernay
- Garland of Besançon
- Guilencus, bishop of Langres
- Heloise
- Pope Innocent II
- Peter Abelard
- Peter, abbot of Toussaint
- Simon, abbot of Saint-Clément de Metz
- Stephen, bishop of Metz
- William of Saint-Thierry

Many of Hugh's letters are answers to scriptural, liturgical and theological questions. He shows a strong preference for Augustine of Hippo. Other letters are complaints about the behaviour of contemporary churchmen. In letter 33, he attributes a symbolic interpretation of the Eucharist to Garland of Besançon and defends transubstantiation.

Hugh was learned in the Bible and the classics. He had read Horace, Ovid and Vergil. Besides Augustine, he had read Jerome, Macrobius and Boethius. He had a love of rare words and used them often. There has been "tendency to view Hugh Metel as bombastic and self-important" on account of his style and especially his letters to Heloise. He praises Heloise for composing music and for writing prose and poetry. He praises her fame and his letter itself is evidence that Heloise's fame had reached the Empire. Heloise did not respond to his first letter and it seems doubtful that she responded to his second.

Hugh's letters were first published in their entirety by Charles-Hyacinthe Hugo in 1731, although a few stray letters had been published earlier.

=== Poems ===
Hugh names himself as the author of a poem dedicated to his friend Simon, abbot of Saint-Clément de Metz, at folios 90vb–91v. The final section of the manuscript Phillipps 1694 (folios 185va–190va) contains a collection of 83 poems. Charles Hugo believed all these to be the work of Hugh, but since many of the poems are also found in the Floridus aspectus of Petrus Riga it is now generally thought that some of them are among the latter's earlierst works.

Hugh's poem Certamen papae et regis, preserved in three manuscripts but not Phillipps 1694, is a "versified debate" between King Henry V of Germany and Pope Calixtus II over the Investiture Controversy. It was probably written shortly before or after the Concordat of Worms (1123). While respectful of royalist arguments, Hugh sides with the pope.

== Bibliography ==
- Clanchy, M. T. (2003). "The Letters of Abelard and Heloise in Today's Scholarship". The Letters of Abelard and Heloise. Penguin. pp. lvii–lxxxiv.
- Lahav, Rina (2021). "Words of Seduction – A Letter from Hugh Metel to Bernard of Clairvaux". In Clare Frances Monagle (ed.). The Intellectual Dynamism of the High Middle Ages. Amsterdam University Press. pp. 83–98. doi:10.1017/9789048537174.005. ISBN 978-90-485-3717-4.
- McDonagh, Christopher J. (2005). "Hugh Metel and the Floridus Aspectus of Peter Riga in Staatsbibliothek zu Berlin Preussischer Kulturbesitz Phillipps 1694". Mediaeval Studies. 67: 27–54. doi:10.1484/J.MS.2.306516.
- McLeod, Enid (1938). Héloïse: A Biography. Chatto & Windus.
- Mews, Constant J. (2001). "Hugh Metel, Heloise, and Peter Abelard: The Letters of an Augustinian Canon and the Challenge of Innovation in Twelfth-Century Lorraine". Viator. 32: 59–92. doi:10.1484/J.VIATOR.2.300730.
- Mews, Constant J. (2005). Abelard and Heloise. Oxford University Press.
- Mews, Constant J.; Heikkinen, Seppo, eds. (2025). The Letters of Hugh Metel. Boydell and Brewer. doi:10.1515/9781837650927. ISBN 978-1-83765-092-7.
- Moore, R. I. (2012). The War on Heresy. Harvard University Press.
- O'Connor, James T. (2005) [1973]. The Hidden Manna: A Theology of the Eucharist (2nd ed.). Ignatius Press.
