= Romance of Muhammad =

Old French romance about the life of Muhammad

Start of the Romance in the only manuscript

The Romance of Muhammad (Old French: Li romans de Mahon or Roman de Mahomet) is an Old French romance about the life of Muhammad in octosyllabic couplets. It was written by Alexandre du Pont in 1258 in Laon based on the earlier Otia de Machomete, a Latin poem by Walter of Compiègne. At 1,996 verses, it is almost twice as long as the Otia. It is preserved in a single manuscript in Paris, Bibliothèque nationale de France, fonds français 1553, from the late 13th century.

The Romance can be broadly divided into six sections: Muhammad's education and meeting with the Christian hermit; his courtship and marriage; the private confirmation of his prophetic mission; public announcement of his prophethood and issuing of the law; the war with Persia; and Muhammad's death. It is written for a Christian lay audience. It is an essentially fictional account designed to ridicule Muhammad, although its depiction of him as "a clever scoundrel, eloquent suitor, and respected leader is not wholly unsympathetic." It contains numerous inaccuracies and anachronisms, such as Greek fire and jongleurs. It diverges from the Otia in only a few cases, which demonstrate Alexandre's familiarity with the Apology of al-Kindi. The limited diffusion of the work suggests that its content was too unusual for its intended audience.

Nothing is known of Alexandre du Pont beyond what he reveals about himself: his name and the date and place of his work. He does exhibit a tendency to sermonize and should perhaps be associated with the cathedral school of Laon.

== Bibliography ==
- Hyatte, Reginald (1997). The Prophet of Islam in Old French: The Romance of Muhammad (1258) and The Book of Muhammad's Ladder (1264). Brill.
- Tolan, John (2012). "Alexandre du Pont". In David Thomas; Alex Mallett (eds.). Christian–Muslim Relations: A Bibliographical History. Vol. 4 (1200–1350). Brill. pp. 395–396.
