= Caecilius Metellus =

Caecilius Metellus may refer to:

- Gaius Caecilius Metellus, Roman politician in the 80s BC
- Gaius Caecilius Metellus Caprarius, Roman consul in 113 BC
- Lucius Caecilius Metellus (disambiguation)
- Marcus Caecilius Metellus (disambiguation)
- Quintus Caecilius Metellus (disambiguation)

== See also ==
- Caecilii Metelli
