= Latin biographies of Muhammad =

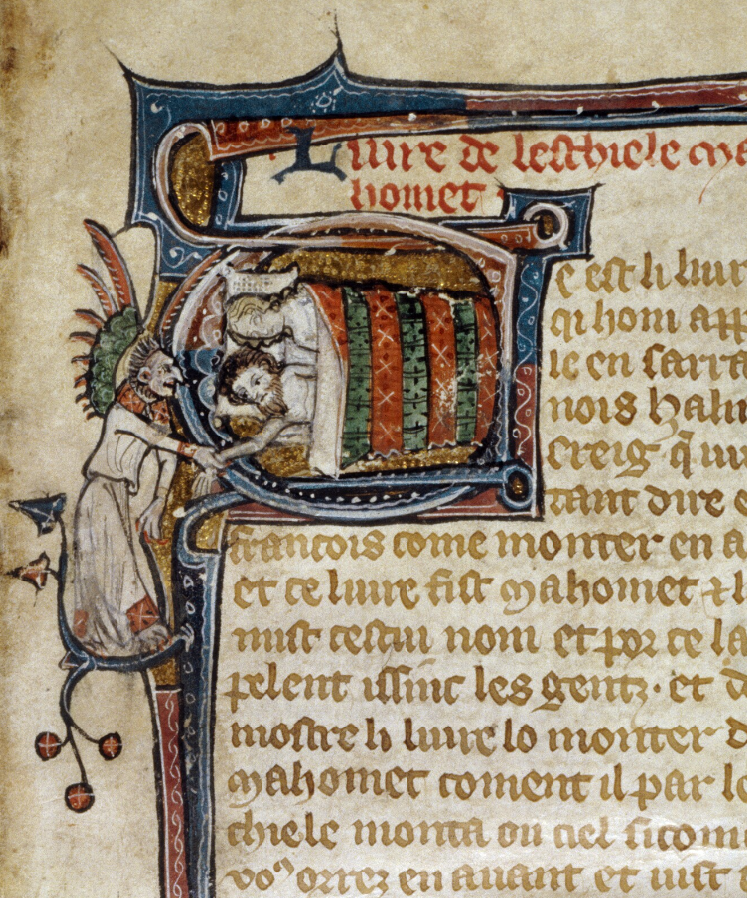
Historiated initial depicting the archangel Gabriel visiting Muhammad while he was in bed with his wife, from the Book of Muhammad's Ladder

A number of biographies of Muhammad were written in Latin during the 9th to 13th centuries.

== Overview ==
The earliest Latin biographies originated in Spain before the mid-9th century. They had a limited circulation and influence. All other Latin biographies are ultimately based on the tradition of the Chronographia of Theophanes the Confessor (d. 818), translated into Latin in the 9th century by Anastasius Bibliothecarius, which contained a chapter on the life of Muhammad.

While Latin biographies of Muhammad in the 11th to 12th century are still in the genre of anti-hagiography, depicting Muhammad as an heresiarch, the tradition develops into the genre of picaresque novel, with Muhammad in the role of the trickster figure, in the 13th century.

The Vita Mahumeti by Embrico of Mainz is an early example of the genre. The text, in rhyming leonine hexameters, was modelled on the verse hagiography of contemporaries such as Hildebert of Le Mans. It was most likely written between 1072 and 1090. It is in the tradition of the Chronographia of Theophanes, including the account of Muhammad's epilepsy and his body being eaten by pigs after his death.

Twelfth-century versions include Otia Machometi by Walter of Compiègne (c. 1155) and Vita Machometi by Adelphus. Thirteenth-century works of the romance type, written in Old French, include the Romance of Muhammad (1258), based on the Otia.

== List of works ==
- Storia de Mahometh (before 848)
- Tultusceptru de libro domni Metobii (9th/10th century)
- Embrico of Mainz, Vita Mahumeti (11th century)
- Adelphus, Vita Machometi (12th century)
- Walter of Compiègne, Otia de Machomete (12th century)
- Vita Mahometi of Uncastillo (1221/1222)
- De Machometo (13th century)
- Liber Nycholay (13th century)
- Where Wicked Muhammad Came From (13th century)
- Book of Muhammad's Ladder, trans. Bonaventura da Siena (13th century)

Biographies of Muhammad are also included in:

- Theophanes the Confessor, Chronicle, trans. Anastasius Bibliothecarius, in Chronographia tripartita (870s)
- Apology of al-Kindi, trans. Peter of Toledo (1142), for the Corpus Cluniacense
- William of Tripoli, Notitia de Machometo (c. 1271) and De statu Saracenorum (1273)

== See also ==
- Medieval Christian views on Muhammad
