= Liber Nycholay =

Latin biography of the Muslim prophet Muhammad

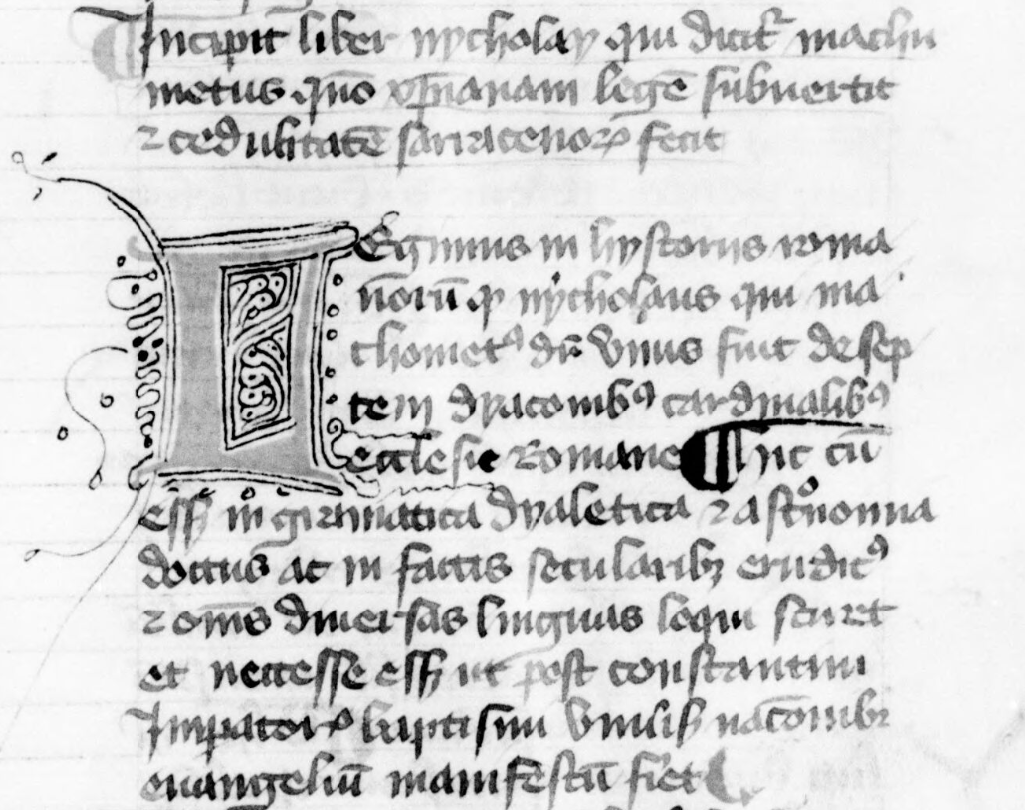
Start of the Liber in the Paris manuscript

The Liber Nycholay (or Book of Nicholas) is a Latin biography of Muhammad. It is an anonymous text, written in Italy in the later 13th century. Of no value as a historical source on Muhammad, it is a melding of various western Christian traditions concerning the origins of Islam written in such a way as to highlight the similarities between Islam and Catholic Christianity while satirizing the papal court.

== Manuscripts ==
The full title as it appears in the manuscripts is Liber Nycholay, qui dicitur Machumetus, quomodo Christianam legem subuertit et credulitatem Sarracenorum fecit, "The book of Nicholas, who is called Muhammad, about how he undermined the Christian law and framed the credulity of the Saracens". It is preserved in whole or in part in two manuscripts:

- Paris, Bibliothèque nationale de France, MS lat. 14503, at folios 352r–354r
- Vatican City, Biblioteca Apostolica Vaticana, MS Reg. lat. 627, at folios 17v–18v

Only the Paris manuscript contains the complete text. The Paris manuscript was copied in the latter half of the 14th century in Avignon. It also contains Mark of Toledo's translation of the Qur'an and the Collectio Cluniacense of Islam-related translations.

The Vatican manuscript breaks off after 58 lines. The copying of the manuscript in the late 13th or early 14th century was evidently interrupted. It contains one other text, a chronicle entitled Liber de istoriis ueteribus et modernis imperatorum et pontificum romanorum.

== Date and authorship ==
The Liber was composed in Latin in the second half of the 13th century. Internal evidence points to Italy as the place of writing, possibly to Rome specifically. Similarities of language between it and the Liber de istoriis in the Vatican manuscript suggest that the author of the latter, Johannes Ruffus, either had access to the Liber while writing his chronicle or else was also its author.

Little is known of Ruffus. He may have been a South Italian Dominican writing for King Manfred of Sicily. His chronicle shows that he had good knowledge of the city of Rome. He is usually thought to have composed his chronicle in 1261–1262. Some 16th-century sources indicate that he was a Dominican from Cornwall who wrote in the last decade of the 13th century.

== Synopsis ==
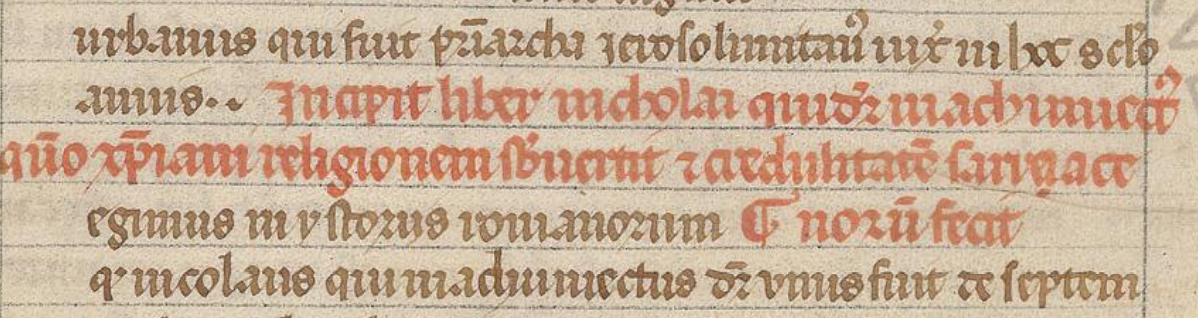
Rubric at the start of the Liber in the Vatican manuscript

The Liber Nycholay contains a major inconsistency in dating. Although the date expressly given for the foundation of Islam—AD 612, that is, 300 years after the baptism of Constantine I—is approximately correct, the events are also placed after the death of Pope Agapetus II, which took place in 956.

Nicholas, a cardinal deacon acting as papal legate in Hispania and Barbary, is the chosen successor of Pope Agapetus. When the pope dies while Nicholas is away, the cardinals elect instead John, the cardinal of San Lorenzo in Damaso. To avenge the insult, Nicholas founds a rival religion. He writes a sacred book advocating polygamy, ablutions, alms and fasting and forbidding confession, Easter and drinking wine during the day. These new rules he supports with quotations from the Bible.

Nicholas goes public with his mission at a council in Marrakesh. He redistributes church property to the poor and buttresses his prophetic claims with miracles. He appoints various officials and settles down in Baghdad, where he is murdered by Marzocco, the jealous husband of his lover Carufa. His relics are preserved in Mecca, where his followers continue to visit them. The history of his empire is briefly surveyed, including the Arab conquest of Spain (711–712) and the Arab siege of Constantinople (717–718).

== Analysis ==
The Liber Nycholay blends various traditions about Muhammad. The name Nicholas is taken from the tradition that identified Muhammad with the biblical deacon Nicholas of Antioch, purported founder of Nicolaitism. The cardinal, however, is clearly not intended to be the same person as the 1st-century deacon. A connection between Islam and Nicolaitism was first drawn by Paschasius Radbertus in the 9th century.

From a different tradition, represented by Embrico of Mainz, the author of the Liber took the idea that Muhammad was the Patriarch Nestorius. Rather than equate the two, he incorporates the Nestorian critique of confession into Muhammad's religion. The idea that Islam originated in the West is another separate tradition, found, e.g., in Aimericus of Angoulême. Of authentic Islamic custom the author had some knowledge, e.g., of ritual ablution, fasting, circumcision and Eid al-Adha.

The tone of the Liber is non-vitriolic and humorous. Its portrayal of Islam is conciliatory. The religion is an offshoot of Catholic Christianity. It ends by noting that Christians, Jews and Muslims will continue to fight each other despite all believing in one Creator. The main purpose of the Liber was not to give an accurate account of Islam's origins, but to critique and satirize the Roman curia.

The Italian historian Michele Amari argued that the text is a Ghibelline criticism of the papacy, blaming it for the rise of Islam. The Spanish historian Maribel Fierro argues that the Liber was inspired by the rise of the reformist Almohads in the West.

== Bibliography ==
- Fierro Bello, María Isabel (2012). "La visión del otro musulmán: el Liber Nicholay y la revolución almohade". In Juan Martos Quesada; Marisa Bueno Sánchez (eds.). Fronteras en discusión: la Península Ibérica en el siglo XII. A. C. Almudayna. pp. 143–161.
- González Muñoz, Fernando (2004). "Liber Nycholay: la leyenda de Mahoma y el cardenal Nicolás". Al-Qanṭara. 25 (1): 5–43. doi:10.3989/alqantara.2004.v25.i1.147.
- González Muñoz, Fernando (2012). "Liber Nycholay". In David Thomas; Alex Mallett (eds.). Christian–Muslim Relations: A Bibliographical History. Vol. 4 (1200–1350). Brill. pp. 650–653.
- Sommerlechner, Andrea (2000). "Eine stadtrömische Kaiser-Papst-Geschichte zu Ehren von König Manfred: Der Liber de istoriis des frater Johannes Ruffus". Römische Historische Mitteilungen. 42: 245–306.
- Yolles, Julian; Weiss, Jessica, eds. (2018). Medieval Latin Lives of Muhammad. Harvard University Press.
