= Vita Machometi (Adelphus) =

Latin biography of Muḥammad

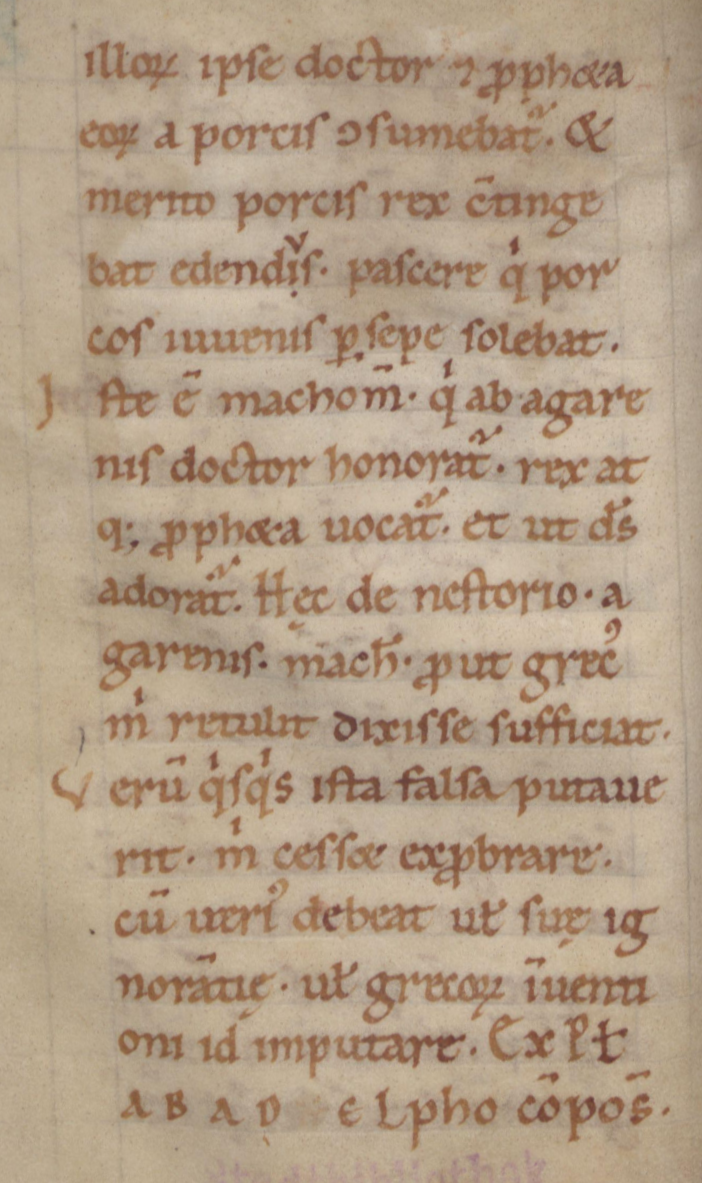
The end of the Vita in the sole manuscript. The last line is the explicit identifying the author as Adelphus.

The Vita Machometi is a Latin biography of Muḥammad written by a certain Adelphus in the early to mid-12th century. Nothing is known of the author but what he reveals about himself in the Vita. This includes that he had heard the Muslim call to prayer and had conversed with a Greek about Islam while staying in Antioch on a return trip from Jerusalem. Taken together, these facts suggest that he may have been a participant in the First Crusade. He seems to have had a biblical and classical education. He may have been a Benedictine abbot.

The Vita is a polemical account of Muḥammad's life based, so Adelphus claims, on the account of the Greek from Antioch. It contains a mixture of actual knowledge of Islam and imaginary and folkloric accounts of its origins. Adelphus had clear misgivings about his information and sought to blame "the inventiveness of the Greeks". The Vita relates that Muḥammad was a swineherd led by an evil spirit to seek out the heretical monk Nestorius (probably intended to refer to the Patriarch Nestorius). The latter teaches him magic and necromancy. They create a new holy book—the Qurʾān—by corrupting the Bible, although Adelphus does not describe their doctrines in detail. They present Muḥammad as a new prophet and produce fake miracles. Muḥammad marries the "queen of Babylon". To take over the leadership of the movement, he murders Nestorius and frames a bodyguard. Since the murder took place while all were drunk, he bans alcohol. While out hunting one day, Muḥammad is attacked and eaten by pigs, which is why Muslims refuse to eat pork.

The Vita Machometi contains many parallels to the 11th-century Latin life of Muḥammad by Embrico of Mainz. The murder of Muḥammad's tutor is also found in the account of William of Tripoli. Like Guibert of Nogent, Adelphus portrays Islam as the latest in a succession of Christian heresies arising in the east, like monophysitism and Nestorianism. In addition to these western influences, he includes material borrowed from eastern traditions.

The Vita Machometi was not widely read. It is known from a single manuscript of the mid-12th century, now in the Municipal Library of Trier and catalogued as MS 1897 (18). The manuscript also contains the Historia de preliis and Berno of Reichenau's tonary.

== Bibliography ==
- Tolan, John V. (2002). Saracens: Islam in the European Imagination. Columbia University Press.
- Tolan, John V. (2011). "Adelphus". In David Thomas; Alex Mallett (eds.). Christian–Muslim Relations: A Bibliographical History. Vol. 3 (1050–1200). Brill. pp. 572–573.
- Yolles, Julian; Weiss, Jessica, eds. (2018). Medieval Latin Lives of Muhammad. Harvard University Press.
