= Francisco Márquez Villanueva =

- Born: March 21, 1931; Seville, Spain
- Died: June 15, 2013 (aged 82); Boston, Massachusetts
- Education: University of Seville (PhD)
- Scientific career
- Fields: literary criticism
- Institutions: Harvard University
- Doctoral students: Leyla Rouhi

Francisco Márquez Villanueva (March 21, 1931 – June 15, 2013) was a literary critic and Arthur Kingsley Porter Professor of Romance Languages and Literatures Emeritus at Harvard University.
