= Abraham of Toledo =

13th century Iberian Jewish physician and translator

Abraham of Toledo (c. 1225–1294), also known as Abraham Alfaquín and Abraham ibn Waqar, was an Iberian Jewish physician and translator of the Toledo School of Translators.

== Life ==
Abraham's birthplace is unknown, but was probably either Toledo or Burgos. His surname is also uncertain. "Ibn Shoshan" has been proposed, but it appears that he was a younger brother of Isaac ibn Waqar, the physician of Juan Manuel.

Abraham served as personal physician to Alfonso X of Castile and his son Sancho IV of Castile, under whose patronage he translated numerous books from Arabic into Castilian. Together with five other prominent court Jews, he was kidnapped and held hostage from 1270 to 1275 by rebellious nobles demanding the elimination of taxes.

== Works ==
Abraham translated in 1263 the Kitab al-Miraj ('The Book of Muhammad's Ladder'), an account of the Mi'raj, into Castilian under the title La escala de Mahoma. His Castilian translation was in turn translated into French by Bonaventure of Siena the same year, the first book on the subject of Muhammad's prophethood presented to a French lay audience. He later translated (after 1270) a cosmographical work of Alhazen under the title Libro de la constitución del universo (Arabic: Kitab fi Hay’at al-ʿAlam), and revised a 1277 translation of Arzachel's Libro de la Açafeha (Arabic: al-Safiḥa) by Fernando of Toledo found unsatisfactory by the king.
