= Diocesan synod (Catholic Church) =

Special meeting in the Catholic Church

A Diocesan synod is a meeting in the Catholic church of various people in a diocese. Diocesan synods are called by the bishop, and are used to discuss pastoral issues in the diocese.

== Canon law ==
As a process within the Catholic church, diocesan synods are governed by the Code of Canon Law. Canons 460 through 468 govern diocesan synods.

=== People obligated to participate ===
Canon 463 §1 lists people who are required to be invited to a synod and are obligated to participate in it. Some of these people include any auxiliary bishops, one priest from each vicariate forane, and any religious superiors who have a house in the diocese and are chosen by the bishop. According to canon 464, if any of these people, or any other member of the synod, are impeded from attending the synod, they must inform the bishop, and cannot send a proxy in their place.

=== Rights and obligations of the bishop ===
The diocesan bishop is the only person who can convene a diocesan synod (canon 462 §1). He proceeds over the entire synod, and can choose to suspend or dissolve the synod if he thinks it would be prudent to do so (canons 462 §2 and 468 §1). This bishop is obligated to give the texts of all declarations and decrees made during the synod to the Metropolitan and the Episcopal Conference (canon 467).

== Process ==
=== Preparation ===
Diocesan synods are preceded by a preparation period, during which a commission will assemble topics and issues to discuss during the synod, doing so by gathering feedback, both from Catholics and non Catholics. The commission then presents the issues to the bishop, who makes an agenda for the synod.

=== During the synod ===
During the synod, the issues in the agenda prepared by the bishop are discussed. After times of discussion, votes might be held for resolutions related to the discussions. These resolutions do not implement new rules, and instead only act as a consultative vote, as power to institute new rules within the diocese lies with the bishop.
