= Vita Mahometi (Uncastillo) =

The Vita Mahometi ('life of Muḥammad') is a short Latin biography of Muḥammad composed in 1221–1222. It is preserved in a single manuscript, now códice 10 in the church of Santa María la Mayor in Uncastillo. It was probably composed in the same area in the north of Aragon. Its author is not named in the manuscript, but it may have been written by the same author as the work that precedes it, the Tractatus contra Iudaeos. He introduces himself as a Jewish convert to Christianity who took the name Peter.

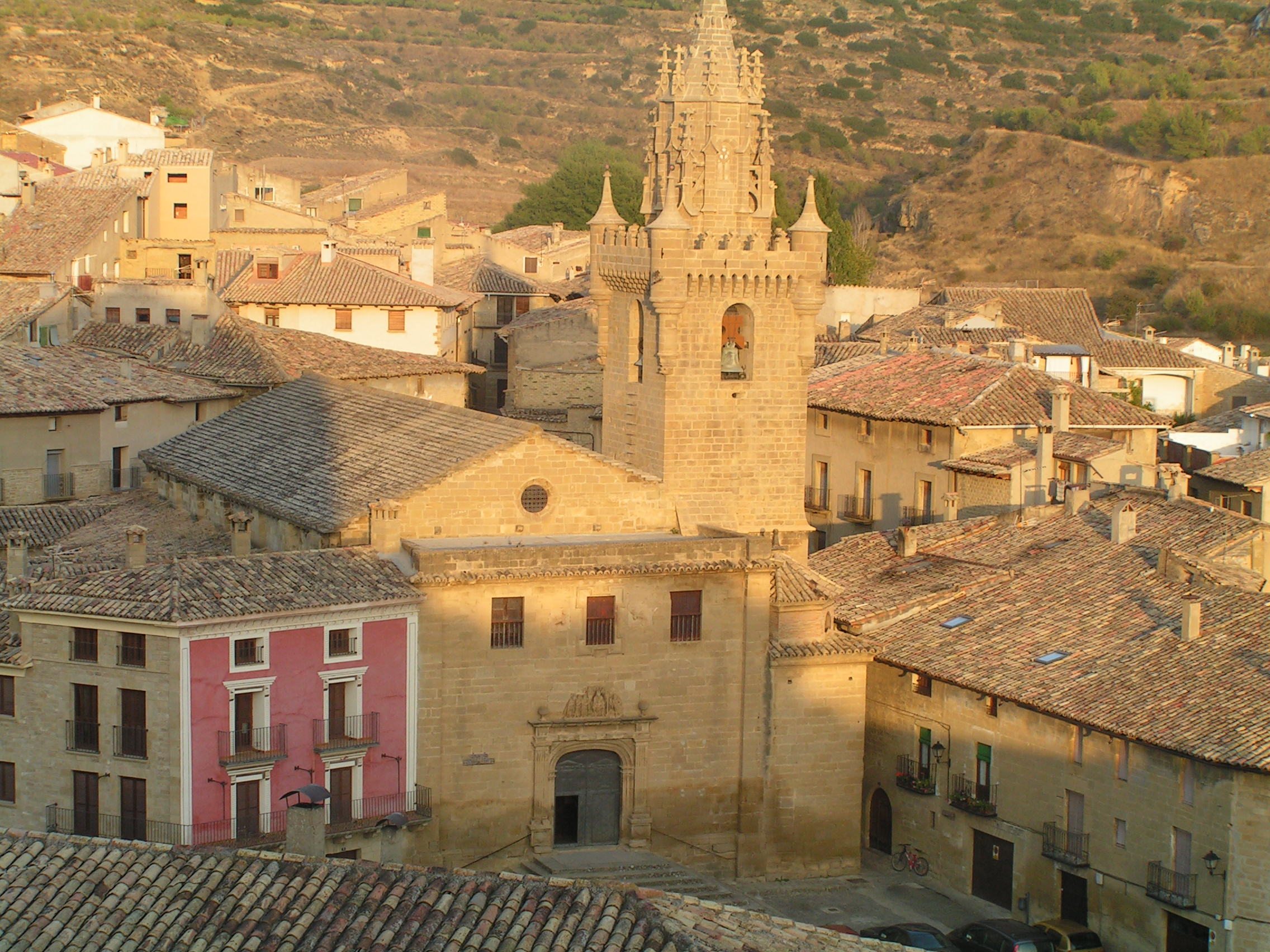
Church of Santa María in Uncastillo

The Vita Mahometi is an explicitly Christian work that seeks to expose Muḥammad as a false prophet motivated by sexual lust and a desire for political power. The author's stated purpose is to correct the misunderstanding that Muḥammad was a Christian, although the author admits that he did receive help from Jews and Christians. The work may be classified as "anti-hagiography", although it is less polemical in tone than many other medieval anti-hagiographies of Muḥammad.

The text takes up only 119 lines in the manuscript and may be divided into six sections. The first part concerns Muḥammad's early life down to the Hijra, his flight from Mecca to Medina. The second part concerns his lust. His first wife is Hadiga. He married another sixteen women, the last one stolen from another man. The third part covers the sources of his ideas and his early preaching. The fourth part, taking up about half the text, is an account of his false miracles and his miʿrāj or ascent to heaven. It is the earliest western biography with an account of the miʿrāj, which is treated as his fourth miracle. The account may be drawn from the Copto-Arabic Kitāb al-wāḍiḥ bi-l-ḥaqq, a Latin translation of which was available in Spain at the time. The conversation between Muḥammad and God, in which the teachings of Islam are revealed, is the centrepiece. The Vita does not mention the isrāʾ (night journey) or Muḥammad's visit to hell. The final two parts are a description of his death from illness and of his teaching about Jesus, Mary and the Apostles.

The Latin text has been published three times.

== Bibliography ==
- Burman, Thomas E. (1994). Religious Polemic and the Intellectual History of the Mozarabs, c. 1050–1250. Brill.
- Di Cesare, Michelina (2012). The Pseudo-historical Image of the Prophet Muhammad in Medieval Latin Literature: A Repertory. De Gruyter.
- Echevarría, Ana (2005). "Eschatology or Biography? Alfonso X, Muhammad's Ladder and a Jewish Go-Between". In Leyla Rouhi; Cynthia Robinson (eds.). Under the Influence: Questioning the Comparative in Medieval Castile. Brill. pp. 133–152.
- Serrano y Sanz, Manuel [in Spanish] (1931). "Vida de Mahoma según un códice latino de mediados del siglo XIII". Erudición ibero-ultramarina. 2: 365–395.
- Valcárcel Martínez, Vitalino (2002). "La «Vita Mahometi» del códice 10 de Uncastillo (s. XIII): estudio y edición". In Maurilio Pérez González (ed.). Actas del III Congreso Hispánico de Latín Medieval: León, 26–29 de septiembre de 2001. Vol. 1. Universidad de León. pp. 211–245.
- Valcárcel Martínez, Vitalino (2012). "Vita Mahometi". In David Thomas; Alex Mallett (eds.). Christian–Muslim Relations: A Bibliographical History. Vol. 4 (1200–1350). Brill. pp. 207–211.
