= Lucius Caecilius Metellus =

Lucius Caecilius Metellus may refer to:

- Lucius Caecilius Metellus Denter, consul in 284 BC
- Lucius Caecilius Metellus (consul 251 BC)
- Lucius Caecilius Metellus (tribune 213 BC)
- Lucius Caecilius Metellus Calvus, consul in 142 BC
- Lucius Caecilius Metellus Delmaticus, consul in 119 BC
- Lucius Caecilius Metellus Diadematus, consul in 117 BC
- Lucius Caecilius Metellus (consul 68 BC) (died 68 BC)
- Lucius Caecilius Metellus (tribune 49 BC)
