= Walter of Compiègne =

French poet

Walter of Compiègne was a French poet who lived in the middle of the 12th century and was a monk at Saint Martin's at Tours. He composed a Latin biography of Muhammad in elegiac couplets.

The story of Mahomet reached Walter by oral tradition, according to the information he himself provides. Its source was a young Muslim who was brought to France after the First Crusade by a French knight, and who converted to Christianity. He narrated the life of Mahomet to Pagan of Sens, the abbot of Notre Dame d'Étampes. Paganus told it to Warner, abbot of the monastery at Tours, and Warner told it to Walter of Compiègne. Otia de Machomete (Poetic Pastimes on Muhammad) may be given as its title. The poem begins:

Quisquis nosse cupis patriam Machometis et actus
otia Walterii de Machomete lege.
Sic tamen otia sunt, ut et esse negotia credas:
ne spernas, quotiens "otia" fronte legis.

If you wish to know about Muhammad's country and his deeds,
then read Walter's poetic pastimes on Muhammad.
These poetic pastimes are such that you might also believe they are serious:
so do not scorn them when you see "pastimes" on the front.

== Bibliography ==
- F. J. E. Raby, A History of Secular Latin Poetry in the Middle Ages (Oxford: Clarendon Press, 1934. ISBN 0-19-814325-7) vol. 2 pp. 82–83.
- Yolles, Julian; Weiss, Jessica, eds. (2018). Medieval Latin Lives of Muhammad. Harvard University Press.
