= Quintus Caecilius Metellus =

Quintus Caecilius Metellus may refer to:

- Quintus Caecilius Metellus (consul 206 BC)
- Quintus Caecilius Metellus Balearicus
- Quintus Caecilius Metellus Celer
- Quintus Caecilius Metellus Creticus
- Quintus Caecilius Metellus Creticus Silanus
- Quintus Caecilius Metellus Macedonicus
- Quintus Caecilius Metellus Nepos (consul 98 BC)
- Quintus Caecilius Metellus Nepos (consul 57 BC)
- Quintus Caecilius Metellus Numidicus
- Quintus Caecilius Metellus Pius
- Quintus Caecilius Metellus Pius Scipio

== See also ==
- Caecilius Metellus (disambiguation)
