= Marcus Caecilius Metellus =

Marcus Caecilius Metellus may refer to:

- Marcus Caecilius Metellus (praetor 206 BC)
- Marcus Caecilius Metellus (consul 115 BC)
- Marcus Caecilius Metellus (praetor 69 BC)
