= Bonaventure of Siena =

Italian writer

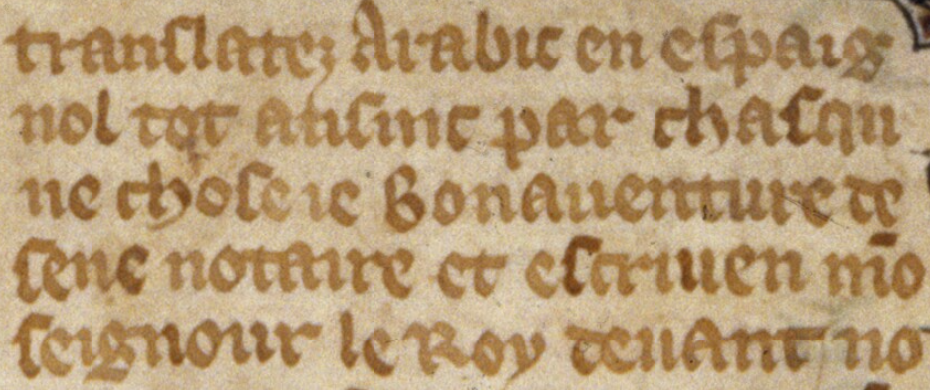
Bonaventure (Bonauenture de Sene) named as translator in the preface to the French Muhammad's Ladder

Bonaventure of Siena (Italian: Bonaventura da Siena) was a Tuscan scribe and translator who worked at the court of Alfonso X of Castile in the 1260s, when Alfonso was claiming the Holy Roman Empire. His most famous work is a translation of the Book of Muhammad's Ladder into Latin and French.

== Life ==
Nothing is known of Bonaventure's family or of his biography before he arrived at the court of Alfonso X in Seville. He arrived after Alfonso's election as Holy Roman emperor, along with may other expatriates from the Ghibelline city of Siena. The earliest reference to him is from 1264, when he was a "notary and scribe of the lord king". On 10 May 1266, on Alfonso X's instruction, he drew up the act by which the infante Fernando de la Cerda named the men who would represent him at his proxy marriage to Blanche, daughter of Louis IX of France.

On 18 January 1284, Peter III of Aragon named a certain Filippo Bonaventura da Siena, recommended to him by Cardinal Latino Malabranca Orsini, as a member of his familia regis. This may have been Bonaventure's son. His presence in Spain would be explained by his father's earlier contacts there, although the exact purpose of his visit is unknown.

== Work ==
Bonaventure was commissioned by Alfonso X to translate the Book of Muhammad's Ladder into Latin and possibly also French. He worked from Abraham of Toledo's Spanish translation of an Arabic original. A note in the only surviving French manuscript indicates that the French translation was completed in May 1264. Some doubts have been raised about the ascription of the French translation to Bonaventure. It has been argued that he only produced the Latin translation shortly before 1264, while the French translation was made from the Latin shortly after by an anonymous translator from Provence.

He wrote an original preface to the Latin translation, addressed to Alfonso.

== Bibliography ==
- Carmona Ruiz, María Antonia (2018). "La sucesión de Alfonso X: Fernando de la Cerda y Sancho IV" (PDF). Alcanate: Revista de Estudios Alfonsíes. 11: 151–186.
- Cerulli, Enrico (1969). "Bonaventura da Siena". Dizionario Biografico degli Italiani (in Italian). Vol. 11: Boccadibue–Bonetti. Rome: Istituto dell'Enciclopedia Italiana. ISBN 978-88-12-00032-6.
- Hyatte, Reginald (1997). The Prophet of Islam in Old French: The Romance of Muhammad (1258) and The Book of Muhammad's Ladder (1264). Brill.
- Monfrin, Jacques (1951). "Les sources arabes de la Divine Comédie et la traduction française du Livre de l'Ascension de Mahomet". Bibliothèque de l'École des Chartes. 109 (2): 277–290.
