= Isra' and Mi'raj =

Journey by Muhammad in Islamic tradition

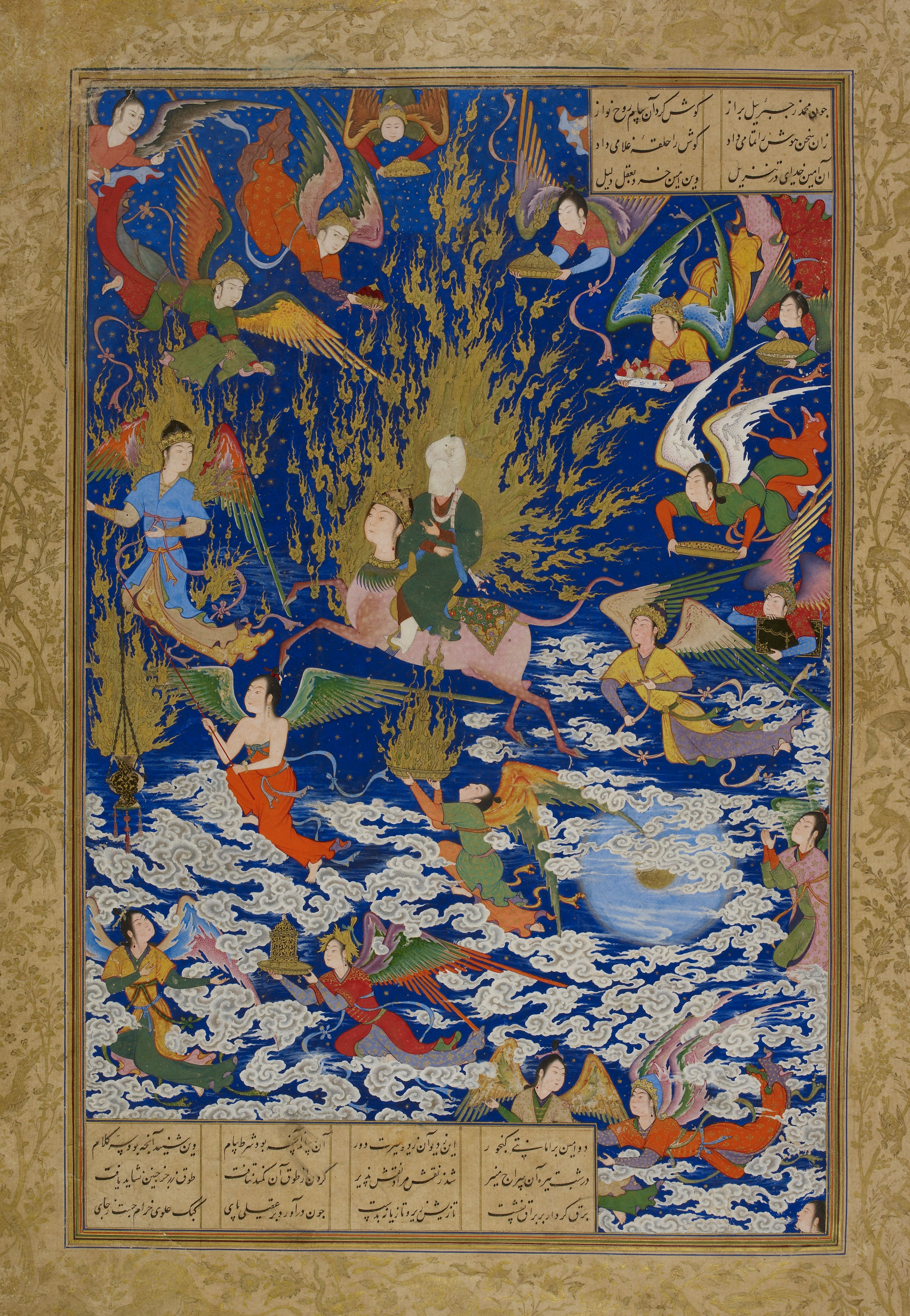
1543 illustration of Muhammad's Night Journey. His ascension to the heavens is often interpreted as an allegory for the human soul ascending to the celestial realms in Islamic philosophy.

The Israʾ and Miʿraj (Arabic: الإسراء والمعراج, romanized: al-’Isrā’ wal-Miʿrāj, lit. 'The Night Travel and Ascension') or Ascension of Muhammad refer to an evolving body of Islamic narratives concerning the night journey, during which the Islamic prophet Muhammad ascends to the heavens, witnesses the afterlife, and returns. The subject holds a pivotal position in shaping many religious-political stances, even today. However, the basis for the issue in the Quran—an indisputable point of reference in the Islamic world—consists solely of two statements with unspecified subjects and addressees; verses 1-18 of Surāh an-Najm and some verses of the 17th chapter of the Quran, later commonly called Surāh al-’Isrā’. The framework and the details are elaborated and developed in various miraculous accounts, some of which are based on hadith —reports of the teachings, deeds, and sayings of Muhammad— compiled centuries after his lifetime.

Approximately two centuries after Muhammad's time, Ibn Sa'd partly assembled the earliest written stories—which had previously been transmitted independently—into a cohesive narrative. This editing process continued in subsequent centuries, evolving into the comprehensive story whose various versions are embraced by different sects today; According to his accounts, the angels Gabriel and Michael accompany Muhammad to a place in the sacred precinct of the Kaaba, between the well of Zamzam and Maqam Ibrahim. There, a ladder (miʿrāj lit means ladder) is set up, with whose help they ascend to heaven. When he reaches the top, Muhammad meets the previous prophets. According to one version of the tradition, Gabriel holds Muhammad's hand tightly and ascends with him to heaven. When he reaches the Sidrat al-Muntaha mentioned in Sura 53:14, Muhammad sees heaven and hell. There, he is required to perform fifty daily prayers, but negotiates with God to reduce them to five, (Note: Some researchers and proponents of Quran-centered Islam do not believe that the Prophet Muhammad performed the five daily prayers; they view these and similar narrations as attempts to retroactively legitimize practices adopted in later centuries.) and is granted the last two verses of Al-Baqarah, known as the treasure from God's throne.

The 27th night of the month of Rajab, is one of the most celebrated holy days and nights in the Islamic calendar. The literature continued to evolve through the incorporation of various narrations that supported the perspectives of different schools of thought. In addition, verses and hadiths concerning the Ascension can also be viewed as a reflection of the Islamic cosmological view in ancient world. While classical commentaries interpret the journey as a miraculous voyage undertaken in the unity of body and soul —a view that also gives rise to theological debates— Sufism generally regards it as a spiritual ascension, remaining apart from such controversies.

== Terminology ==
Al-’Isrā’ literally means "to make someone walk," frequently translated as walking or traveling at night. ʿMiʿrāj literally means "ascending device, ladder" or "ascending place" as counted me'raj, derived from uruj, "rising" or "going up to a high place". The fact that the general name given to the stories is miʿrāj rather than uʿruj may be a reference to the ladder motif in early narratives mentioned above.

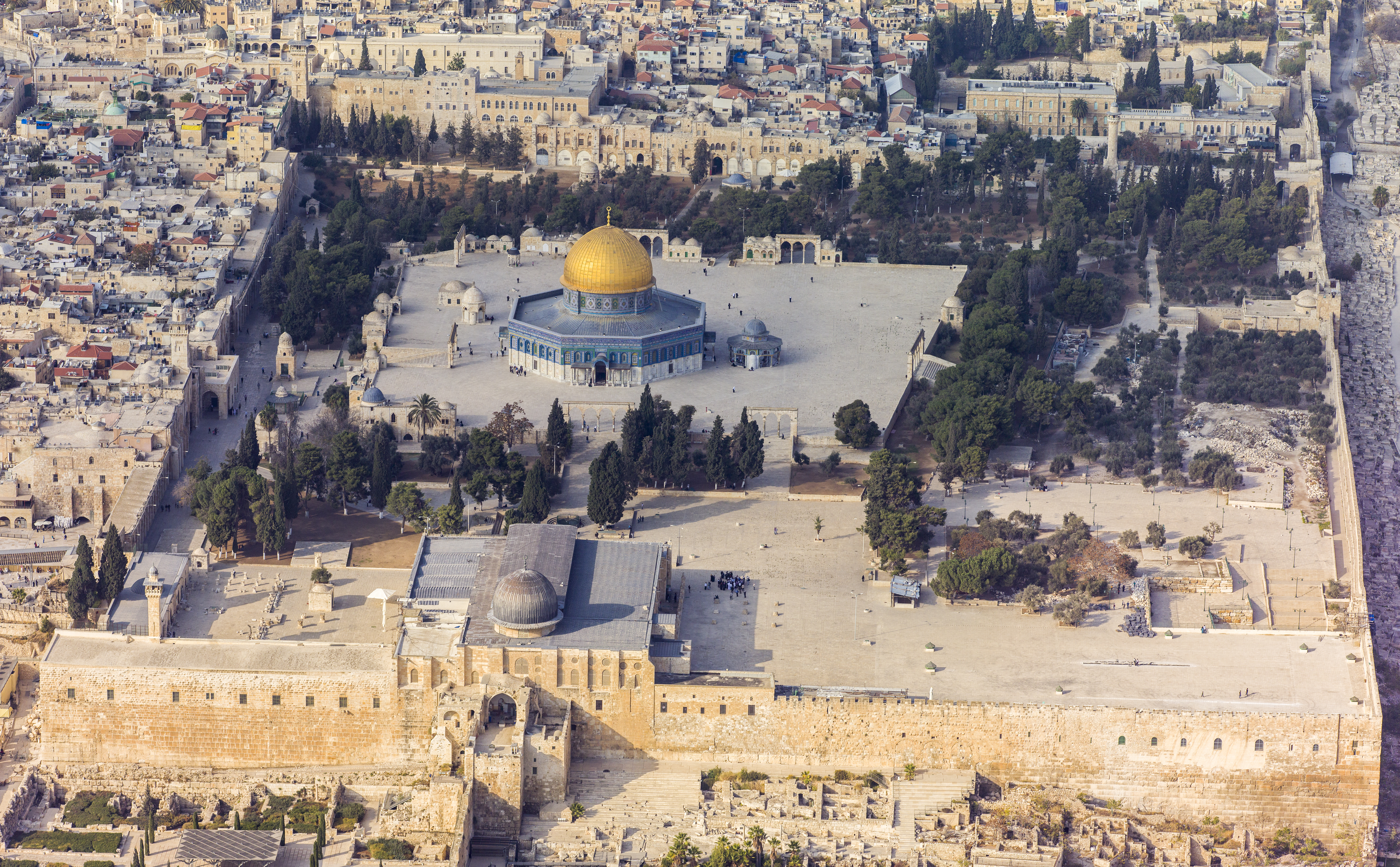
Al-Masjid Al-Aqsa, as mentioned in the Quran, refers to the entire sacred walled sanctuary in Jerusalem, encompassing all structures that are currently within it, including the Dome of the Rock and the Qibli (Al-Aqsa) Mosque

The Bait al-Maqdis (the Holy House) in Aelia, described in the hadiths related to the Miraj, marking the place where Muhammad is believed to have ascended to heaven, is the Arabic pronunciation of the Hebrew name for the Temple of Solomon. The name Al-Quds, given to the city by Muslims a few centuries later derives from the same root.

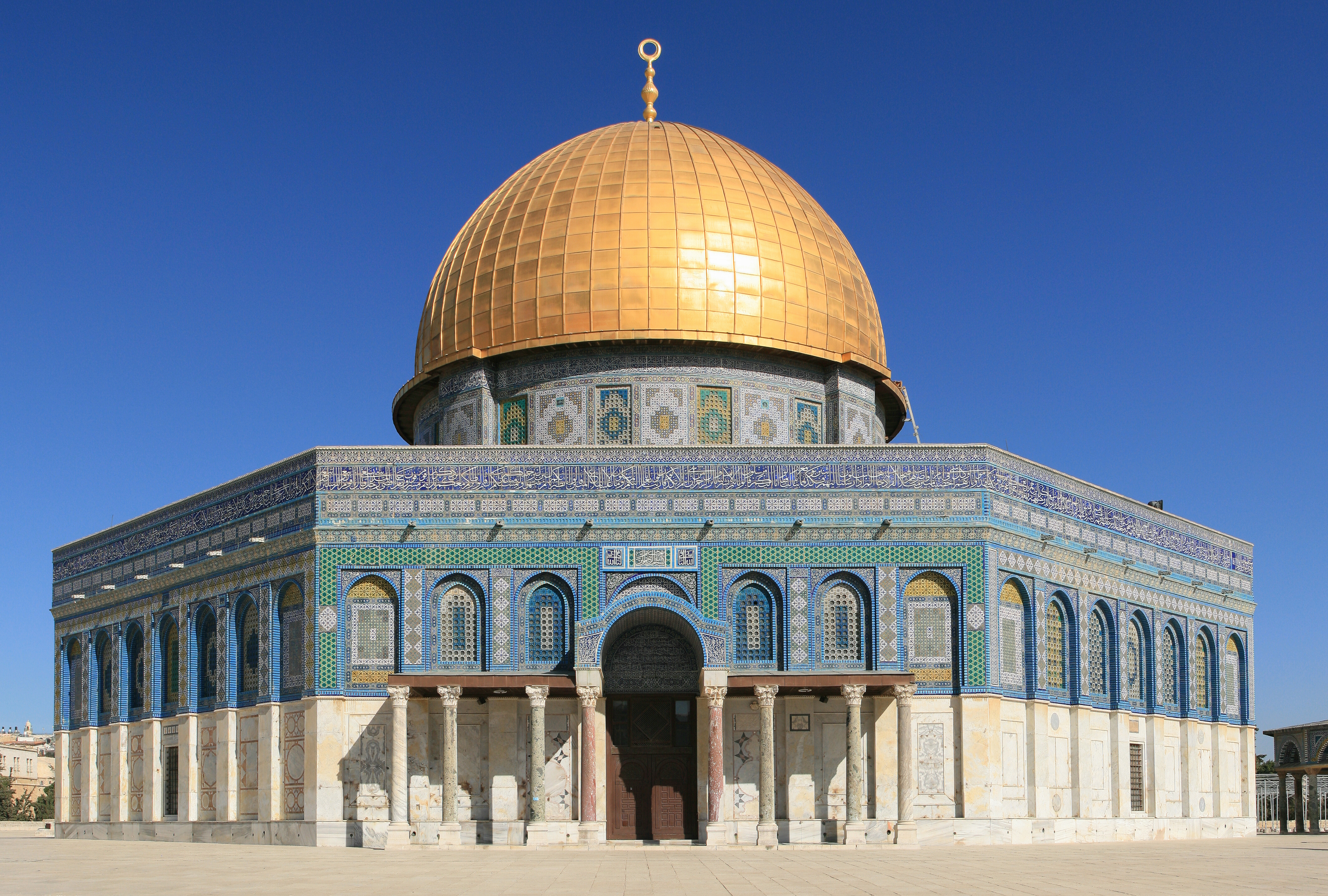
Dome of the Rock, built during the reign of Abdul Malik. Anachronistically associated (Note: "When the Quraish disbelieved me (concerning my night journey), I stood up in Al- Hijr (the unroofed portion of the Ka`ba) and Allah displayed Bait-ul-Maqdis before me, and I started to inform them (Quraish) about its signs while looking at it.") with the Isra and Miraj, it is believed to be the specific place where Muhammad ascended to heaven.

The Dome of the Rock, built on the Muallak (lifted) stone and the Al-Aqsa Mosque (sometimes referred to as "masjid Al-Aqsa"), located on the south wall of the compound, was originally built by the fifth Umayyad caliph Abd al-Malik (r. 685–705) or his successor al-Walid I (r. 705–715) (or both) possibly by political motivations. (See also; Dome of the Ascension)

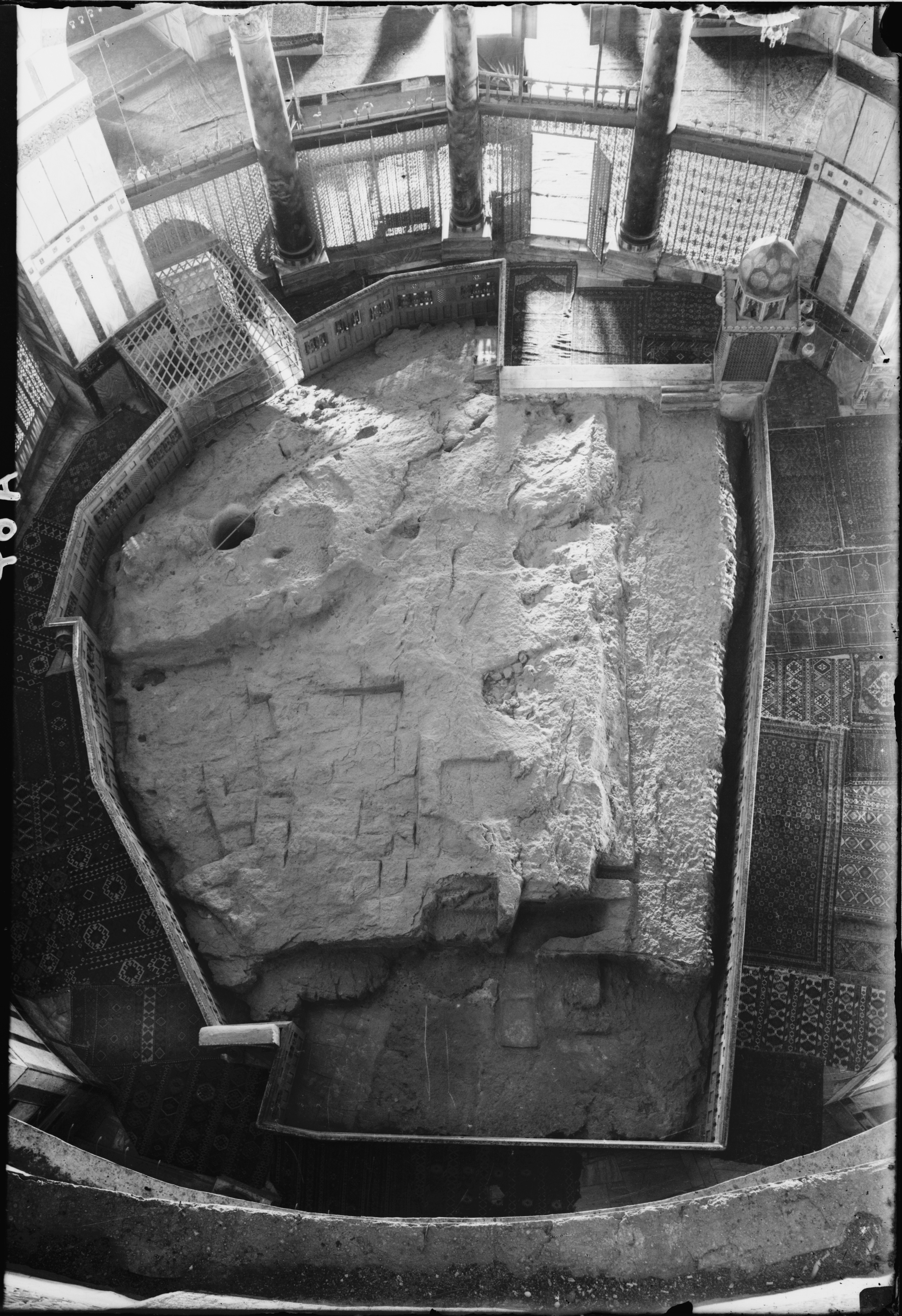
A stone, giving its name to the Dome of the Rock associated with the Miraj in Islamic tradition and blessed; The round hole at upper left penetrates to a small cave, known as the Well of Souls, below.

Another term used today for the Masjid al-Aqsa, which is argued to refer to the whole area of Temple Mount because there were no buildings there during Muhammad's time, is Haram al-Sharif. This terminology, which emphasizes the site's high sanctity, became popular during the Mamluk (1250–1517) and Ottoman periods.

== Islamic tradition ==
=== The Quran ===
The 17th chapter of the Quran takes its name from a word used in the first verse; The name of the sura, which was probably originally called the Surah Banī Isrāʾīl (Arabic: بني إسرائيل, lit. 'The Children of Israel'), during the time of the Companions, gradually became the Surat Al- Isra, and simultaneously, narrations and explanations for Isra began to enter Islamic literature, which is presented as the first stage of the journey, expressed as Isra meaning to make someone walk. The verse is widely considered to refer to Muhammad's miraculous flight from Mecca's al-Masjid al-Haram to Jerusalem's al-Masjid al-Aqsa at night on the back of a mount called Buraq.

A different though not widely accepted, theory and interpretation of the verse, is that the Al-aqsa used in the verse is not associated with Jerusalem, but with Al-Ji'rana, which is located near Mecca based on the hint that Masjid al-Haram is a night walk away from Masjid al-Aqsa in Surah Al-Isra 17:1:

Glory be to the One Who took His servant by night from Masjid al-Haram to the Masjid al-Aqsa whose surroundings We have blessed, so that We may show him some of Our signs. Indeed, He alone is the All-Hearing, All-Seeing

An expression that is connected with the ascention part of the story is the subject-unclear poetic expressions in the Surah An-Najm 53:13-18.

One of the stations of Muhammad's ascent after Al-Aqsa in the "seven heavens"; Sidrat al-Muntaha; The legendary tree in havens, whose branches extend to the last limits of creation; the sacred cedar known as "Arz el-Rab" in Lebanon or, in simple translation, the lote tree.

And he certainly saw that a second time

at the near of ultimate Sidr,

near which is the Garden of Residence

While the Sidr covered by covers!

The sight never wandered, nor did it overreach.

He certainly saw some of his Lord's greatest signs.

Apart from the two verses recorded above, there is no verse in the Quran that is associated with the Miraj. In addition, unlike the references to miracles made to other prophets in the Quran, the verses that deny any miracles of Muhammad outside the Quran attract the attention of some researchers.

== Date ==
Hans Wehr says that the 27th night of the month of Rajab chosen for the Miraj is not based on a report and is an arbitrary choice; Ibn Sa'd recorded that Muhammad's Mi'raj took place first, from near the Kaaba to the heavens, on the 27th of Ramadan, 18 months before the Hijrah, while the Isra' from Mecca to Bayt al-Maqdis took place on the 17th night of the Rabi' al-Awwal before the Hijrah as two different, unconnected events. In Ibn Hisham's account, the Isra' came first and then the Mi'raj, and he put these stories before the deaths of Khadija and Abu Talib. In contrast, Al-Tabari placed this story at the beginning of Muhammad's public ministry, between his account of Khadija becoming "the first to believe in the Messenger of God" and his account of "the first male to believe in the Messenger of God". The 27th night of the month of Rajab, is one of the most celebrated holy days and nights in the Islamic calendar.

=== Story ===
All the details in the story come from the anecdotes of the biography and hadith collections written a few centuries after Muhammad. The story continues to evolve and change across different geographies and belief groups, as can be seen even in the earliest records.

There are different accounts of what occurred before the Miʿraj. While some narratives speak of purification before ascension, others say these are unconnected; Muhammad's chest was opened up, and zamzam water was poured on his heart, giving him wisdom, before going to prepare him for his ascent. This purification theme is also seen in the trial of the drinks. It is debated when it took place—before or after the ascent—but either way, it plays an important role in asserting Muhammad's spiritual righteousness. Two hadiths considered the most reliable rely on Anas ibn Malik and ibn ʿAbbas persons who were recorded as children at the time.

Al-Tabari's summary also reflects his choices and is as follows; Muhammad ascends into heaven with Gabriel and meets a different prophet at each of the seven levels of heaven; first Adam, then John the Baptist and Jesus, then Joseph, then Idris, then Aaron, then Moses, and lastly Abraham. Then continues to meet God without Gabriel. God tells Muhammad that his people must pray 50 times a day, but on return to Earth, he meets Moses, who tells him persistently, "return to God and ask for fewer prayers because fifty is too many". Muhammad goes back and forth between Moses and God nine times until the prayers are reduced to five daily prayers, and God rewards those prayers with the merit of fifty."

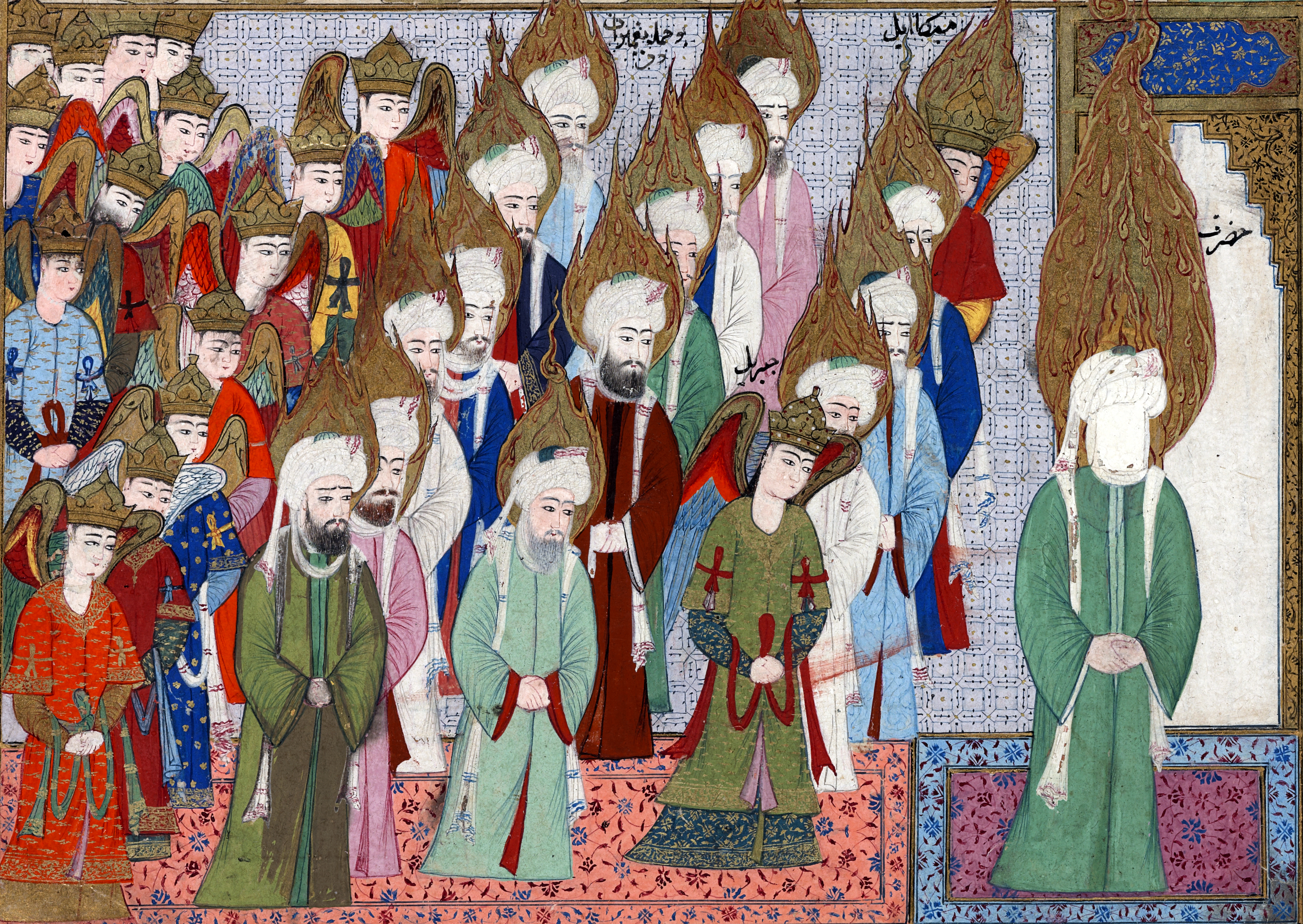
Ottoman miniature: Muhammad leading the prayer in a Celestial Mosque during the Israʾ and Miʿraj, all the prophets and messengers participating in.

==== Ibn Abbas Primitive Version ====
Ibn Abbas's Primitive Versions describe everything Muhammad encountered during his journey through heaven. This includes seeing other angels and the seas of light, darkness, and fire. Muhammad, as companion of Gabriel, met four important angels as he travelled through heaven. These angels were the Rooster angel (whose call influences all earthly roosters), the Half Fire Half Snow angel (an example of God's power to bring fire and ice together in harmony), the Angel of Death, and the Guardian of Hellfire. These four angels are introduced at the beginning of Ibn Abbas's narrative and focus on the angels rather than the prophets. There are ranks of angels in heaven, and he even meets some deeply connected angels called cherubim. These angels instill fear in Muhammad, but he sees them later as God's creation and not harmful.

Other important details that Ibn Abbas adds to the narrative are the heavenly host, the final verses of the Cow Chapter, and the blessing of the prophets. In other versions by Ibn Abbas, a transmitter seems to have added to Ibn Abbas' authentic narrative the descent of Muhammad and the meeting with the prophets. These are the stories of the meeting with the prophets and the meeting with Moses, which led to the reduction of the daily prayers, which are not included in Ibn Abbas' primitive version. Whether Ibn Abbas included this in his original narrative or whether it was added by a later transmitter is a matter of debate.

==== Later versions ====
Other reports add more details; the Israʾ, which was not present in the previous reports of the miraj, is now part of Muhammad's journey from Mecca to "the farthest place of worship", although the city is not explicitly stated. The journey begins while Muhammad is in the Masjid al-Haram in Mecca, when the Archangel Gabriel arrives and brings the prophets' heavenly mount, Buraq. Buraq carried Muhammad to the "farthest place of worship." Muhammad dismounted, tied Buraq up, and prayed, where he was tested by Gabriel at God's command. Anas ibn Malik narrated that Muhammad said: "Gabriel brought me a vessel of wine, a vessel of water, and a vessel of milk, and I chose the milk. Gabriel said: 'You have chosen the fitra (natural instinct).'" During the second part of the journey, on the "ladder" of Miraj, Gabriel took him to the heavens, where he circled the seven heavens and spoke with the previous prophets: Abraham, Moses, John the Baptist, and Jesus.

The most commonly accepted narration includes both the purificacion of Muhammad's heart and going to the Al-Aqsa (i.e. the Farthest or Noble Sanctuary) on Buraq (a winged horse-like creature) accompanied by Gabriel (named "Isra meaning night journey"), tying Buraq and leading the prophets such as Ibrahim, Musa, and Isa in prayer, ascending to the sky (Miʿrāj) from the muallak (suspended) stone, conversations with Allah, dialogues with other prophets in the different heavenly layers, seeing paradise and hell, and returning sections.

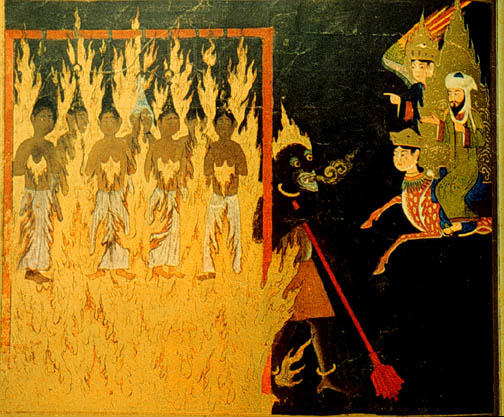
According to terrifying stories (fabricated for some) associated with the ascension, Muhammad, accompanied by Buraq and Gabriel, visits hell; "shameless women are punished for displaying their hair to strangers."(Iranian miniature, 15th century)

== In Alevism and Bektashism ==
The Assembly of the Forty, or the council of forty (in Turkish "Kırklar meclisi"), is a collective worship ceremony in Alevism and Bektashism in which Muhammad is said to have participated upon his return from the Mi'raj. Alevi narratives are stories based on oral transmissions, which have developed, changed, and matured over centuries.

The Alavis Story of the Ascension:On the day Muhammad ascended to the Miraj on his mount Buraq, he was offered honey, milk, and wine or apples. Unlike the classical Sunni Miraj stories, the story includes a section where Muhammad gives his ring, which contains the seal of prophethood, to a lion, and thus passes to the meeting with Allah which alludes Muhammad being removed from being a person who brings Allah's commands. Muhammad spoke ninety thousand words with Allah from behind a veil. However, the voice was familiar and was Ali's voice. Muhammad asked who was speaking to him. The answer was: "I am Allah, but I chose to speak to you with Ali's voice." In another narration, the event is taken to a more advanced level; the veil opens and Muhammad sees Ali's face. Similar allusions are dealt with in later parts, and alongside the understanding developed by islamic theology that Allah cannot be likened to or enter into any created being, the traditional attitudes of Sunnism such as prayer, alcohol prohibition, segregation of men and women, and veiling are challenged with short references.

=== Sufism ===
The belief that Muhammad made the heavenly journey bodily was used to prove the unique status of Muhammad. One theory among Sufis was that Muhammad's body could reach God to a proximity that even the greatest saints could only reach in spirit. They debated whether Muhammad had envisioned God and if he did, whether he did so with his eyes or with his heart. Nevertheless, Muhammad's superiority is again demonstrated in that even in the extreme proximity of the Lord, "his eye neither swerved nor was turned away," whereas Moses had fainted when the Lord appeared to him in a burning bush. Various thinkers used this point to prove the superiority of Muhammad.

The Subtleties of the Ascension by Abu ʿAbd al-Rahman al-Sulami includes repeated quotations from other mystics that also affirm the superiority of Muhammad. Many Sufis interpreted the Miʿraj to ask questions about the meaning of certain events within the Miʿraj, and drew conclusions based on their interpretations, especially to substantiate ideas of the superiority of Muhammad over other prophets.

Muhammad Iqbal, a self-proclaimed intellectual descendant of Rumi and the poet-scholar who personified poetic Sufism in South Asia, used the event of the Miʿraj to conceptualize an essential difference between a prophet and a Sufi. He recounts that Muhammad, during his Miʿraj journey, visited the heavens and then eventually returned to the temporal world. Iqbal then quotes another South Asian Muslim saint by the name of 'Abdul Quddus Gangohi who asserted that if he (Gangohi) had had that experience, he would never have returned to this world. Iqbal uses Gangohi's spiritual aspiration to argue that while a saint or a Sufi would not wish to renounce the spiritual experience for something this-worldly, a prophet is a prophet precisely because he returns with a force so powerful that he changes world history by imbuing it with a creative and fresh thrust.

In Islam, whether the Miraj is a physical or spiritual experience is also a matter of debate based on different arguments and evidence. The physical perception of the Miraj may imply attributing a physical space to God, contradicting the understanding of transcendence (tanzih) that attributed to God in Islam. Many sects and offshoots belonging to Islamic mysticism interpret Muhammad's night ascent to be an out-of-body experience through nonphysical environments, stating "the apostle's body remained where it was" while the majority of Islamic scholars claim that the journey was both a physical and spiritual one.

=== Celebrations ===
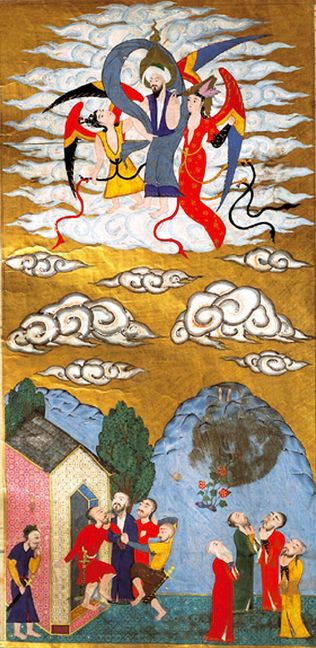
Ascension of Isa (Isa al-Masih), Topkapı Palace Museum, Istanbul, 18th century

In Jerusalem on the Temple Mount, the structure of the Dome of the Rock, built several decades after Muhammad's death, marks the place from which Muhammad is believed to have ascended to heaven. The exact date of the Journey is not clear, but it is celebrated as though it took place before the Hijrah and after Muhammad's visit to the people of Ta'if. The normative view amongst Sunni Muslims who ascribe a specific date to the event is that it took place on the 27th of Rajab, slightly over a year before Hijrah. This would correspond to the 26th of February 621 in the Western calendar. In Twelver Iran, Rajab 27 is the day of Muhammad's first calling or Mab'as. The al-Aqsa Mosque and surrounding area is now the third-holiest place on earth for Muslims.

The Lailat al-Miʿraj (Arabic: لیلة المعراج, Lailatu 'l-Miʿrāj), also known as Shab-e-Mi'raj (Bengali: শবে মেরাজ, romanized: Šobe Meraj, Persian: شب معراج, Šab-e Mi'râj) in Iran, Pakistan, India and Bangladesh, and Miraç Kandili in Turkish, is the Muslim holiday on the 27th of Rajab (the date varying in the Western calendar) celebrating the Isra and Miʿraj. Another name for the holiday is Mehraj-ul-Alam (also spelled Meraj-ul-Alam). Some Muslims celebrate this event by offering optional prayers during this night, and in some Muslim countries, by illuminating cities with electric lights and candles. The celebrations around this day tend to focus on every Muslim who wants to celebrate it. Worshippers gather in mosques and perform prayer and supplication. Some people may pass their knowledge on to others by telling them the story of how Muhammad's heart was purified by the archangel Gabriel, who filled him with knowledge and faith in preparation to enter the seven levels of heaven. After salah, food and treats are served.

== Discussions on history and geography ==
According to Islamic tradition, a small prayer hall (musalla), what would later become the Al-Aqsa Mosque, was built by Umar, the second caliph of the Rashidun Caliphate. A hadith reports Muhammad's account of the experience:

"Then Gabriel brought a horse (Burraq) to me, which resembled lightning in swiftness and lustre, was of clear white colour, medium in size, smaller than a mule and taller than a (donkey), quick in movement that it put its feet on the farthest limit of the sight. He made me ride it and carried me to Jerusalem. He tethered the Burraq to the ring of that Temple to which all the Prophets in Jerusalem used to tether their beasts..."

Although not in all of them, in some hadiths, the Miraj story is handled and processed independently of Al-Aqsa. Besides that city of Jerusalem is not mentioned by any of its names in Surah Al-Isra 17:1, however, the consensus of Islamic scholars is that Quranic reference to masjid al-aqṣā in the verse refers to Jerusalem. Jerusalem is mentioned in later Islamic literature and in the hadith as the place of Isra and Miʽraj.

Some figures contest the consensus that Al-masjid al-aqṣā was in Jerusalem and believe it was somewhere other than Jerusalem. This arises from the belief that there's no evidence of a Mosque on the Temple Mount in Jerusalem before the Islamic conquest of the Levant, and Umar's arrival; The first and second temples were destroyed by the Babylonians and the Romans, respectively, the latter more than five centuries before Muhammad's life. After the initially successful Jewish revolt against Heraclius, the Jewish population resettled in Jerusalem for a short period of time from AD 614 to 630 and immediately started to restore the temple on the Temple Mount and build synagogues in Jerusalem. After the Jewish population was expelled a second time from Jerusalem and shortly before Heraclius retook the city (AD 630), a small synagogue was already in place on the Temple Mount. This synagogue was reportedly demolished after Heraclius retook Jerusalem. In the reign of the caliph Mu'awiyah I of the Umayyad Caliphate (founded in AD 661), a quadrangular mosque for a capacity of 3,000 worshipers is recorded somewhere on the Haram ash-Sharif. This was rebuilt and expanded by the caliph Abd al-Malik in AD 690 along with the Dome of the Rock.

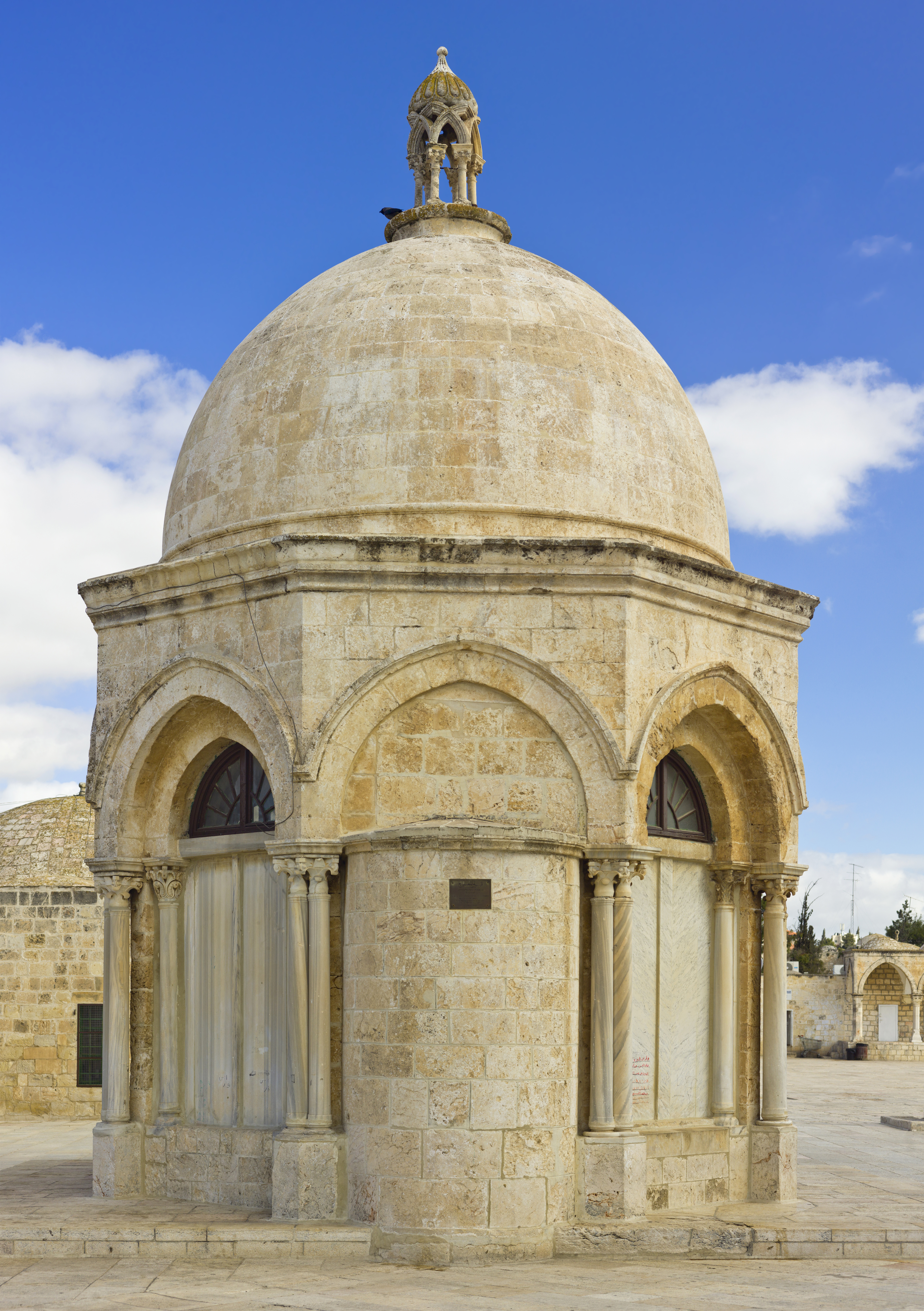
Dome of the Ascension of Muhammad

French American Academic Oleg Grabar believed that the Quranic Al-masjid al-aqṣā referred to one of two sanctuaries in a Hijazi village known as al-Juʽranah near Mecca, basing this on the statement of two near-contemporary medieval Muslim travelers Al Waqidi and Al-Azraqi who used the term "Al-masjid al-aqṣā" , and "Al-masjid al-Adna":

Bevan has shown that among early traditionists there are many who do not accept the identification of the masjid al-aqsa, and among them are to be found such great names as al-Bukhari and Tabari. Both Ibn Ishaq an al-Ya'qubi precede their accounts with expressions which indicate that these are stories which are not necessarily accepted as dogma. It was suggested by J. Horovitz that in the early period of Islam, there is little justification for assuming that the Koranic expression in any way referred to Jerusalem. But while Horovitz thought that it referred to a place in heaven, A. Guillaume's careful analysis of the earliest texts (al-Waqidi and al-Azraqi, both in the later second century A.H.) has convincingly shown that the Koranic reference to the masjid al-aqsa applies specifically to Al-Ji'rana, near Mekkah, where there were two sanctuaries (masjid al-adnai and masjid al-aqsa), and where Muhammad so-journed in dha al-qa'dah of the eighth year after the Hijrah.

Israeli political scientist Yitzhak Reiter mentions some alternative interpretations among some Muslim sects in the 21st century which dispute that the night journey took place in Jerusalem, believing instead it was either in the Heavens, or in Medina and its vicinity by Jaf'ari Shi'tes. Reiter also claimed that the location being in Jerusalem was a tradition invented after Muhmmad's life by the Umayyad Caliphate to divert pilgrimage to either Shi'ite sites such as Al-Kufa, or Mecca when it was held by Abd Allah ibn al-Zubayr during the Second Muslim Civil war

== European reception ==
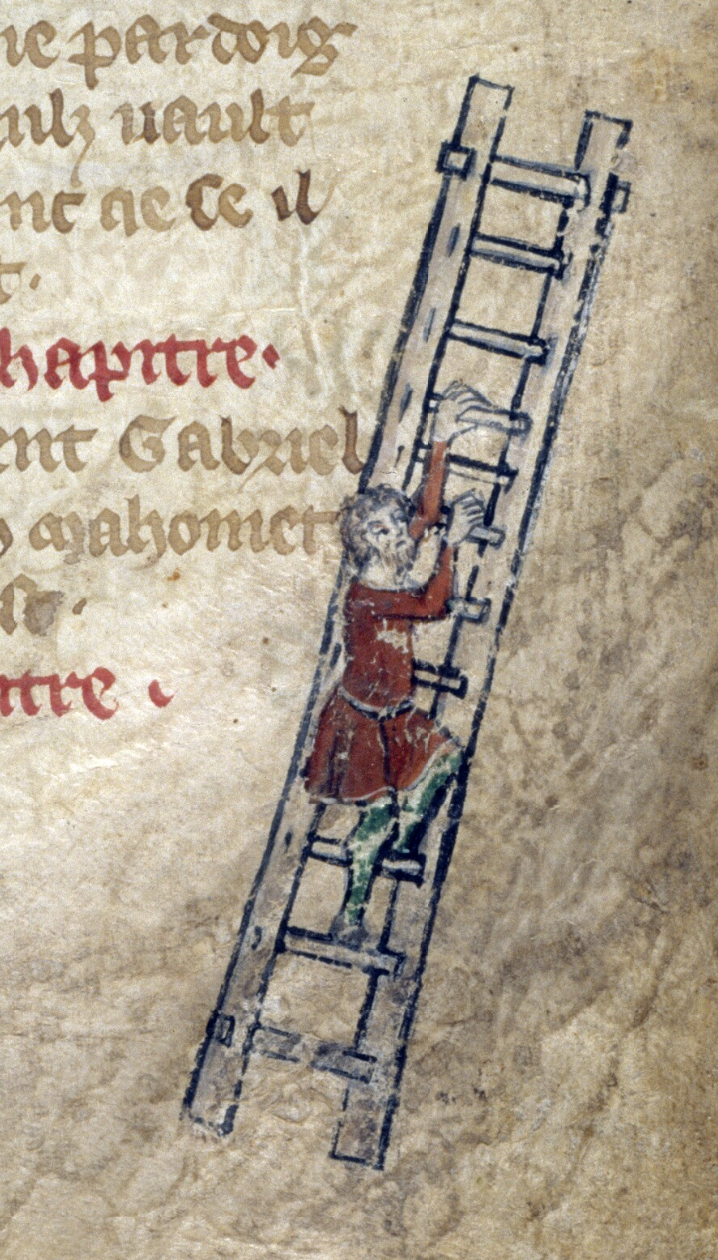
Illustration depicting Muhammad ascending a ladder, from the only known copy of Livre de l'eschiele Mahomet.

In the 13th century AD, an account of the Isra' and Mi'raj was translated into several European languages—Latin, Spanish and French. Known as the Book of Muhammad's Ladder, this account purports to be the words of Muhammad himself as recorded by Ibn Abbas. It was translated by Abraham of Toledo and Bonaventure of Siena. It may have influenced Dante Alighieri's account of an ascent to heaven and descent to hell in the Divine Comedy.

== Parallels in other traditions ==
Traditions of living persons ascending to heaven are also found in early Jewish and Christian literature. The Book of Enoch, a late Second Temple Jewish apocryphal work, describes a tour of heaven given by an angel to the patriarch Enoch, the great-grandfather of Noah. According to Brooke Vuckovic, early Muslims may have had precisely this ascent in mind when interpreting Muhammad's night journey.

The similarity of many details in the Miraj narratives to Zoroastrian literature is striking. While critics argue that these narratives are a transfer from Zoroastrian literature, another claim argues that the relevant literature was written after Islam.

== See also ==
- Entering heaven alive - view of the belief in various religions
- Ascension of Jesus
- Miraj Nameh
- Book of Arda Viraf
