= Leyla Rouhi =

Iranian literary scholar

- لیلا روحی
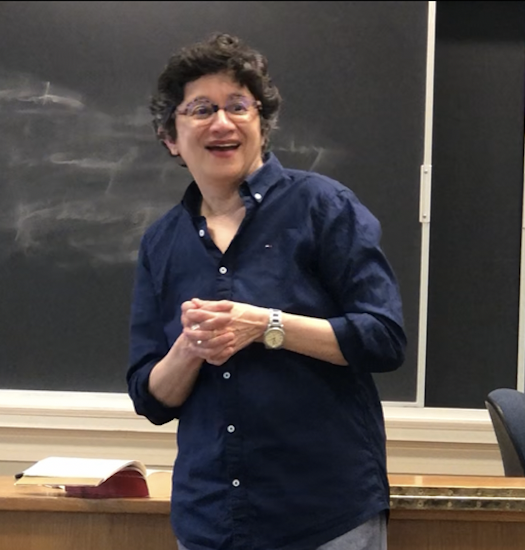
- Awards: Massachusetts Professor of the Year (2010)

Academic background
- Education: Harvard University (PhD); Oxford University (BA)
- Thesis: A Comparative Typology of the Medieval Go-between in Light of Western-European, Near-Eastern, and Spanish Cases (1995)
- Doctoral advisor: Francisco Márquez Villanueva

Academic work
- Discipline: literary scholar
- Sub-discipline: romance literature comparative literature
- Institutions: Williams College

Leyla Rouhi is an Iranian-American literary scholar and Mary A. and William Wirt Warren Professor of Romance Languages at Williams College. She is known for her expertise on comparative literature.

== Career ==
Leyla Rouhi specializes in medieval and early modern Spain as well as Comparative Literature. She has written extensively on Cervantes and Islam, as well the figure of the old woman as go-between in medieval Near Eastern and European traditions. She is the translator, from Spanish into English, of the first modern time-travel novel, The Anacronópete by Enrique Gaspar, edited by Michael Cooperson. She has also written on book culture in the poetry of Lope de Vega and the Persian manuscript collection of the Fundación Lázaro Galdiano in Madrid.

She has published, in collaboration with Julie A. Cassiday, a study of the role of Persia in Alexander Sokurov's Russian Ark, the procuress in the theatre of Mikhail Bulgakov, and the go-between figure in Leopoldo Alas' La Regenta. Her other publications include a survey of Persian-language translations of Don Quijote and a critique of the mythologization of the singer Qamarulmuluk Vaziri. Previously, Rouhi was Preston S. Parish '41 Third Century Professor of Romance Languages. She teaches all levels of Spanish language and a wide range of content courses on Spain as well topics in Comparative Literature.

== Books ==
- Mediation and Love: A Study of the Medieval Go-Between in Key Romance and Near-Eastern Texts, Brill, 1999
- Under the Influence: Questioning the Comparative in Medieval Castile, edited with Cynthia Robinson, Brill, 2004
- The Other Martyrs: Women and the Poetics of Sexuality, Sacrifice, and Death, edited with Alireza Korangy, Otto Harrassowitz Verlag Press, 2018
