= Embrico of Mainz =

Embrico of Mainz (Embricho Moguntinus) is the author of the Vita Mahumeti, a Latin biography of Muhammad. He was active in the decades around 1100.

== Biography ==
Embrico's date and place of birth or death are unknown. The main source of information about him is the short poetic Vita auctoris (Life of the Author) attached to the Vita Mahumeti. It gives the author's name, associating him with Mainz, and praises his education and piety. It says that he wrote the Vita Mahumeti while a student and that he wrote other works in prose. These are lost, as no other work attributed to Embrico is known.

Scholars have attempted to date the Vita Mahumeti on the basis of the information in the Vita auctoris and the poem's dedication to a certain Godebold. Proposed dates of composition range from 1040 to 1137, but he was probably writing after 1073. He has been identified with the treasurer of Mainz Cathedral named Embrico, who held that office from 1090 until 1112. This Embrico later became provost of the cathedral (as Embrico II). If he was a student when he composed the Vita, then he probably wrote before 1090. John Tolan puts his work a little later, in the first quarter of the 12th century. He has been identified with Bishop Embricho of Würzburg (r. 1127–1146), but in praising him the Vita auctoris does not mention that he became a bishop.

The identity of the dedicatee, Godebold, is also uncertain. He may be the Godebold who was provost of Mainz before Embrico II. Alternatively, supporting an identification with the bishop of Würzburg, he may Godebold II, the burggrave of Würzburg from 1096 to 1144.

== Vita Mahumeti ==
The text consists of 1,148 lines of rhyming leonine hexameters. It was modelled on the verse hagiography of contemporaries such as Hildebert of Le Mans.

Embrico's text is roughly contemporary with the Dei gesta per Francos by Guibert of Nogent. Both texts are in the tradition of the Chronographia of Theophanes the Confessor, including the account of Muhammad's epilepsy and his body being eaten by pigs after his death.

The Latin text with a prose tanslation into English is provided by Yolles and Weiss.

== Bibliography ==
- González Muñoz, Fernando (2015). Mahometrica: ficciones poéticas latinas del siglo XII sobre Mahoma. Consejo Superior de Investigaciones Científicas.
- Tolan, John V. (1996). "Anti-Hagiography: Embrico of Mainz's Vita Mahumeti". Journal of Medieval History. 22: 25–41.
- Tolan, John V. (2002). Saracens: Islam in the European Imagination. Columbia University Press.
- Tolan, John V. (2011). "Embrico of Mainz". In David Thomas; Alex Mallett (eds.). Christian–Muslim Relations: A Bibliographical History. Vol. 3 (1050–1200). Brill. pp. 592–595.
- Yolles, Julian; Weiss, Jessica, eds. (2018). Medieval Latin Lives of Muhammad. Harvard University Press.
