= Hildebert of Lavardin =

French ecclesiastic, hagiographer and theologian

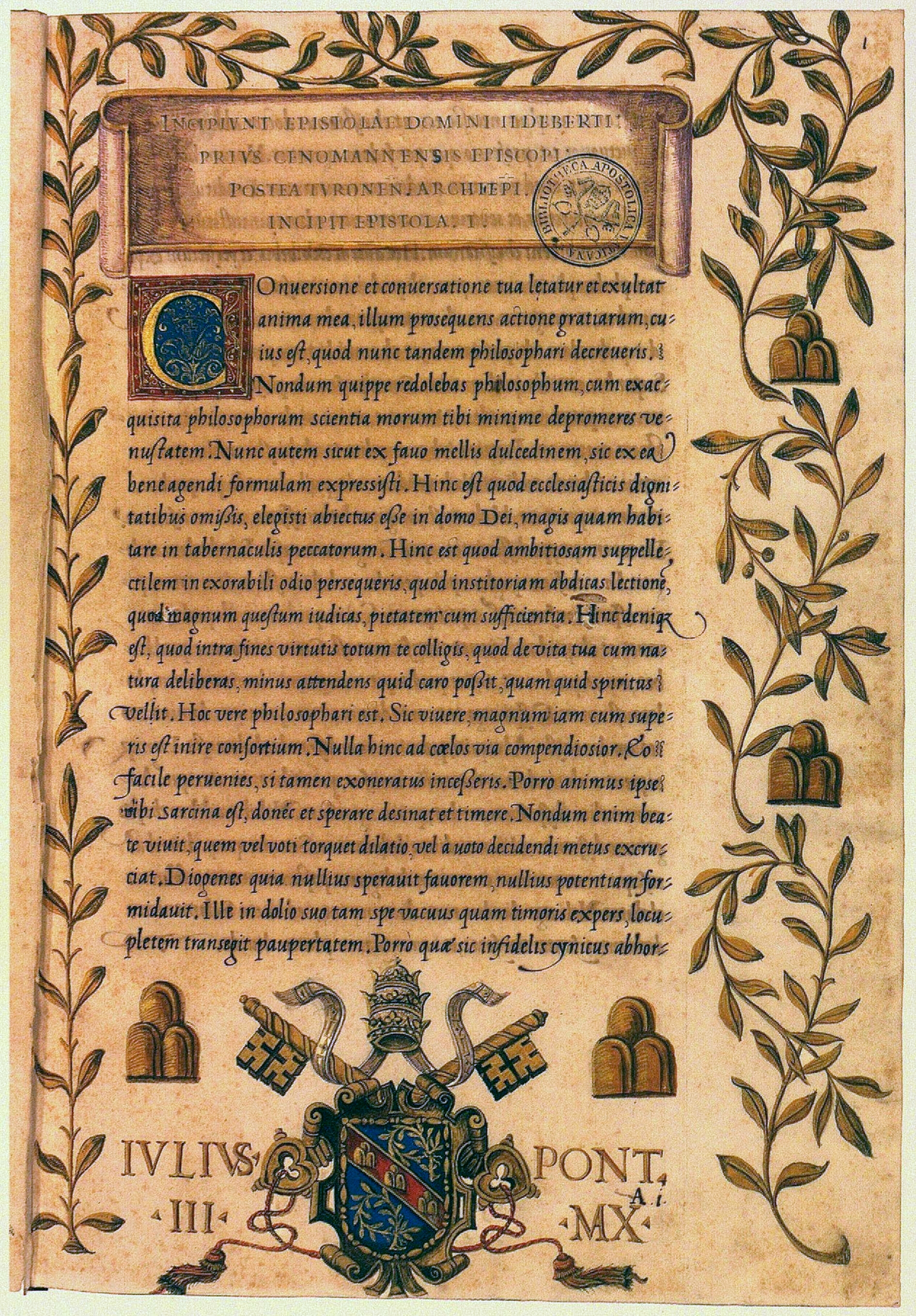
Hildebert's letters, from a 16th-century manuscript (Biblioteca Apostolica Vaticana, Vat. lat. 3841, fol. 1r)

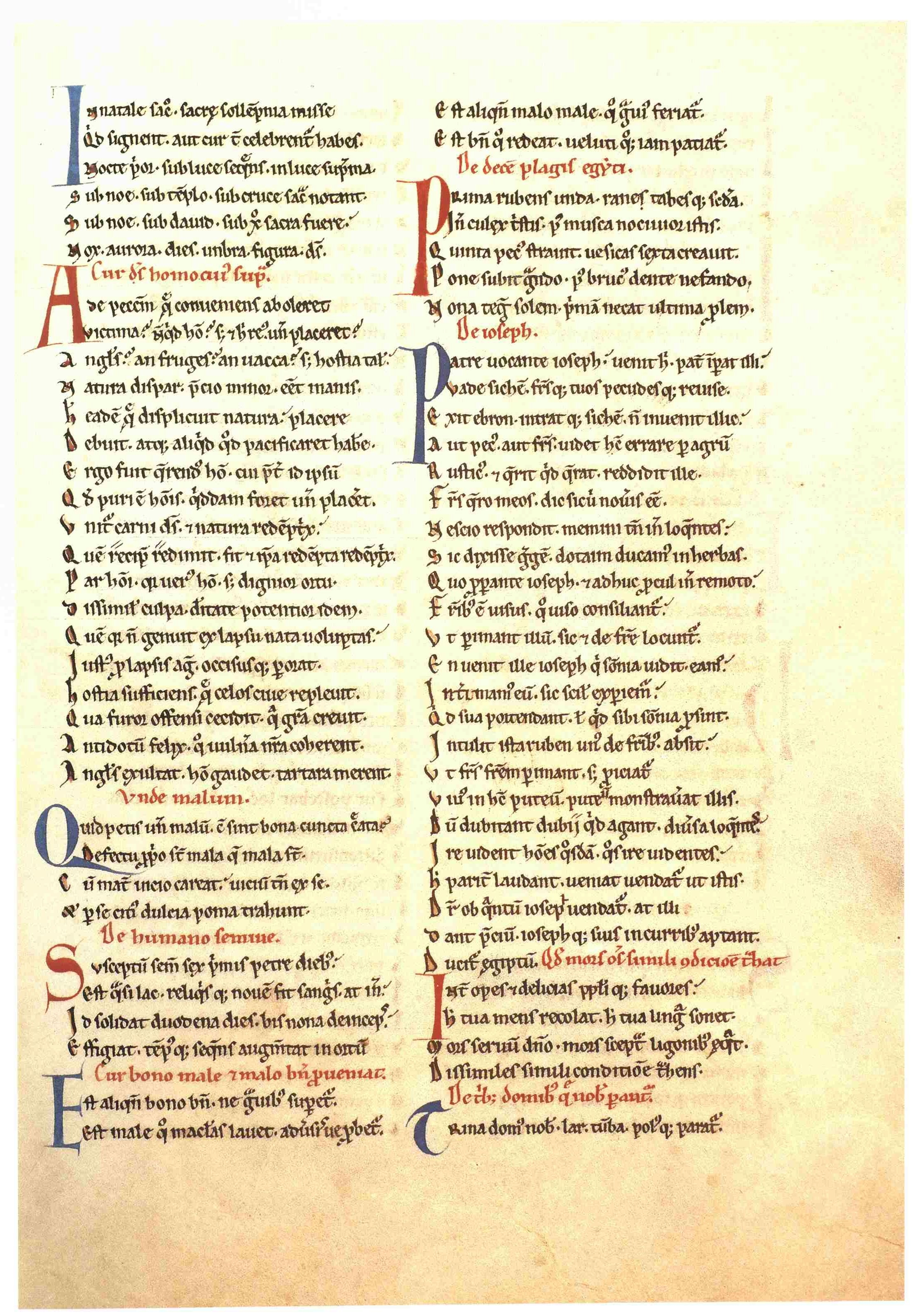
Hildeberts's poem, from a 12th-century manuscript (Berlin, Staatsbibliothek, Ms. lat. fol. 591, fol. 77r)

Hildebert of Lavardin (c. 1055 – 18 December 1133) was a French ecclesiastic, hagiographer and theologian. From 1096–97 he was bishop of Le Mans, then from 1125 until his death archbishop of Tours.

== Life ==
Hildebert was born of poor parents at Lavardin, near Vendôme, and was intended for the church. He was probably a pupil of Berengar of Tours, and became master (scholasticus) of the school at Le Mans; in 1091 he was made archdeacon and in 1096 or 1097 bishop of Le Mans. He had to face the hostility of a section of his clergy and also of the English king, William II, who captured Le Mans and carried the bishop with him to England for about a year.

Hildebert then (in 1100 or 1103) travelled to Rome and sought permission to resign his bishopric, which Pope Paschal II refused. In 1116 his diocese was thrown into great confusion owing to the preaching of Henry of Lausanne, who was denouncing the higher clergy, especially the bishop. Hildebert compelled him to leave the neighborhood of Le Mans, but the effects of his preaching remained.

In 1125 Hildebert was translated unwillingly to the archbishopric of Tours, where he came into conflict with the French king Louis VI about the rights of ecclesiastical patronage, and with the bishop of Dol about the authority of his see in Brittany. He presided over the Synod of Nantes, and died at Tours probably on December 18, 1133. Hildebert built part of the cathedral at Le Mans. Some writers have referred to him with the title of saint, but there appears to be no authority for this. He was not a man of very strict life; his contemporaries, however, had a very high opinion of him and he was called egregius versificator by Orderic Vitalis.

== Works ==
The extant writings of Hildebert consist of letters, poems, a few sermons, two lives and one or two treatises. An edition of his works prepared by the Maurist, Antoine Beaugendre, and entitled Venerabilis Hildeberti, prima Cenomanensis episcopi, deinde Turonensis archiepiscopi, opera tam edita quam inedita, was published in Paris in 1708 and was reprinted with additions by J-J Bourassé in 1854. These editions, however, are faulty. They credit Hildebert with numerous writings by others and omit some genuine writings. Revelation of this fact has affected Hildebert's position in the history of medieval thought.

His former standing as a philosopher rested on his supposed authorship of the important Tractatus theologicus—but this is now regarded as the work of Hugh of St Victor. Consequently, Hildebert is no longer thought of as a philosopher. His genuine writings include many letters. These Epistolae enjoyed great popularity in the 12th and 13th centuries, and were frequently used as classics in the schools of France and Italy. They include two letters concerning the struggle between the emperor Henry V and Pope Paschal II, which were edited by Ernst Sackur and printed in the Monumenta Germaniae historica. Libelli de lite ii. (1893), but whose attribution to Hildebert is very doubtful.

His poems on various subjects were also very popular. Hildebert attained celebrity also as a preacher both in French and Latin, but only a few of his genuine sermons exist, most of the 144 his editors attributed to him being the work of Peter Lombard and others.

The Vitae Hildebert wrote are the lives of Hugh of Cluny and of St Radegunda. His liber de Querimonia et Conflictu carnis et Spiritus seu animae is also undoubtedly his. Hildebert was an excellent Latin scholar, being acquainted with Cicero, Ovid and other authors.

He sent letters and poetry to Adela of Normandy advising her on clemency, and praised her regency of Blois.

== Editions ==
- Hildeberts Prosimetrum de Querimonia und Die Gedichte Eines Anonymus: Untersuchungen und Kritische Editionen, ed. Peter Orth (Vienna, 2000).
- Hildebertus Cenomannensis Episcopus. Carmina Minora, ed. A. Brian Scott, 2d ed. (Munich and Leipzig, 2001).
- Hildeberti Cenomanensis Episcopi Vita Beate Marie Egipticae, ed. Norbert Klaus Larsen, Corpus Christianorum Continuatio Mediaevalis 209 (Turnhout, 2004).
- "The Gods Have Faces": The Biblical Epigrams and Short Poems of Hildebert of Lavardin, ed. Marc Wolterbeek (Turnhout, 2024).
