= John V. Tolan =

American historian

- Born: John Victor Tolan; 1959 (age 66–67); Milwaukee, Wisconsin, U.S.
- Occupation: Historian

John Victor Tolan (/ˈtoʊlæn/; born 1959) is a historian of religious and cultural relations between the Arab and Latin-speaking civilizations of the Middle Ages.

== Biography ==
He was born in Milwaukee and received a BA in Classics from Yale (1981), an MA (1986) and a PhD (1990) in History from the University of Chicago, and an Habilitation à diriger des recherches from the Ecole des Hautes Etudes en Sciences Sociales in Paris (2001).

He has taught and lectured in universities in North America, Europe, Africa and the Middle East and is Professor Emeritus of History at the University of Nantes, where he directed a major European research program, "RELMIN: The legal status of religious minorities in the Euro-Mediterranean world (5th-15th centuries)".

Member of several learned societies, director of the Maison des Sciences Homme Ange Guépin of Nantes and coordinator of the Institute of Religious Pluralism and Atheism, he is an elected member of the Academia Europaea since 2013.

He works on the history of the rich web of relations in the medieval Mediterranean world, between Jews, Christians and Muslims.

== Distinctions ==
- 2008 : Diane Potier-Boès Award of the Académie Française
- 1995 : American Endowment for the Humanities

== Published works ==
=== Books ===
- Petrus Alfonsi and his Medieval Readers (Gainesville: University Press of Florida, 1993)
- Les Relations entre les pays d'Islam et le monde latin du milieu du Xème siècle au milieu du XIIIème siècle (Paris: Bréal, 2000)
- Saracens: Islam in the Medieval European Imagination (New York: Columbia University Press, 2002)
- Sons of Ishmael: Muslims through European Eyes in the Middle Ages (Gainesville: University Press of Florida, 2008)
- Saint Francis and the Sultan: The Curious History of a Christian-Muslim Encounter (Oxford: Oxford University Press, 2009; French edition published in Paris: Seuil, 2007).
- L’Europe latine et le monde arabe au Moyen Âge : Cultures en conflit et en convergence (Rennes: Presses universitaires de Rennes, 2009)
- Europe and the Islamic world: A history (Oxford: Oxford Princeton University Press, 2013).
- Faces of Muhammad: Western Perceptions of the Prophet of Islam from the Middle Ages to Today (Princeton: Princeton University Press, 2019)
- Nouvelle histoire de l'islam : VIIe - XXIe siècle (Paris: Tallandier, 2022)
- England's Jews. Finance, Violence, and the Crown in the Thirteenth Century (Philadelphia : University of Pennsylvania Press, 2023)
- Islam: A New History from Muhammad to the Present (Princeton: Princeton University Press, 2025)

=== Collective works ===
- Christian Perceptions of Islam: A Book of Essays (New York: Garland Press, 1996)
- Espaces d'échanges en Méditerranée: Antiquité et Moyen Âge (Rennes: Presses Universitaires de Rennes, 2006)
- Culture arabe et culture européenne: l'inconnu au turban dans l'album de famille (Paris: L'Harmattan, 2006)
- L'Echange: actes des journées le lien social (Paris: L'Harmattan, 2009)
- Minorités et régulations sociales en Méditerranée médiévale (Rennes: Presses Universitaires de Rennes, 2010)
- Enjeux Identitaires en Mutation: Europe et Bassin Méditerranéen (Bern: Peter Lang, 2013)
- The Legal Status of Ḏimmī-s in the Islamic West: second/eighth-ninth/fifteenth centuries (Turnhout: Brepols, 2013)
- Religious cohabitation in European towns: 10th-15th centuries (Turnhout: Brepols, 2014)
- Jews in Early Christian Law Byzantium and the Latin West: 6th-11th centuries (Turnhout: Brepols, 2014)
- Jews and Christians in Medieval Europe: The historiographical legacy of Bernhard Blumenkranz (Turnhout: Brepols, 2015)
- Expulsion and Diaspora Formation: Religious and Ethnic Identities in Flux from Antiquity to the Seventeenth Century (Turnhout: Brepols, 2015)
- Law and Religious Minorities in Medieval Societies: Between Theory and Praxis (Turnhout: Brepols, 2016)
- Religious Minorities, Integration and the State (Turnhout: Brepols, 2016)
- Religious Minorities in Christian, Jewish and Muslim Law: 5th-15th Centuries (Turnhout: Brepols, 2017)
- Faits religieux et manuels d'histoire (Paris: Arbre bleu, 2018)
- Geneses: A Comparative Study of the Historiographies of the Rise of Christianity, Rabbinic Judaism, and Islam (London / New York: Routledge, 2019)
- The Latin Qur’an, 1143–1500 : Translation, Transition, Interpretation (Berlin: De Gruyter, 2022)

in French

- with Mohammad Ali Amir-Moezzi, Le Mahomet des historiens, Les Éditions du Cerf 2025.
