= Nomina regum catolicorum Legionensium =

Medieval Latin list of kings of Asturias and León

The Nomina regum catolicorum Legionensium ("Names of the Catholic Kings of León", Spanish: Nómina Leonesa) is a medieval regnal list of the kings of Asturias and León from Pelagius to Ramiro II. It is found in the Codex Vigilanus the Codex Rotensis. It was reportedly compiled in 929, although this was two years before the reign of Ramiro II. A date of 931 has also been claimed.

== Text ==
ITEM NOMINA REGUM CATOLICORUM LEGIONENSIUM
1. Pelagius filius Ueremundi nepus Ruderici regis Toletani. Ipse primus ingressus est in asperibus montibus sub rupe et antrum de Aseuba.
2. Deinde filius eius Fafila.
3. Deinde Adefonsus gener Pelagi.
4. Post illum frater eius Froila.
5. Deinde Aurelio.
6. Post Aurelio Adefonsus castus, qui fundabit Oueto.
7. Deinde Nepotianus cognatus regis Adefonsi.
8. Post Nepotiano Ranimiro.
9. Post filius eius Ordonius, qui allisit Albailda.
10. Deinde filius eius Adefonsus, qui allisit Ebrellos.
11. Ac post filius eius Garsea.
12. Inde Ordonius.
13. Inde frater eius Froila.
14. Post filius eius Adefonsus.
15. Ac deinde Santius filius Ordoni.
16. Deinde Adefonsus, qui dedit regno suo et conuertit ad Dominum.
17. Post frater eius Ranemirus. Sunt sub uno XVI.
