= Storia de Mahometh =

Medieval anti-Islamic biography of Muhammad in Latin

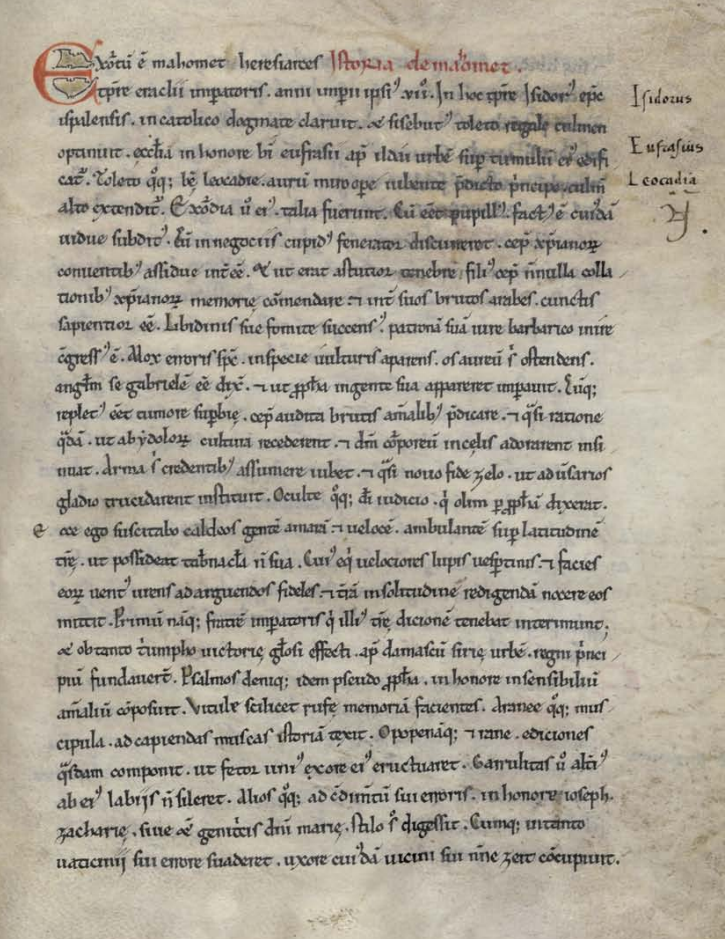
Late 12th-century copy. The text in red reads Istoria de Mahomet. In the margin are the names of three saints mentioned in the text: Isidore, Euphrasius and Leocadia.

The Storia de Mahometh (or Istoria de Mahomet) is a short anonymous polemical Latin biography of Muḥammad written from a negative Christian perspective, probably in al-Andalus between about 750 and 850. It contains the earliest known translation into Latin of any portion of the Qurʾān.

== Date and authorship ==
The Storia is the earliest known biography of Muḥammad in Latin. It was certainly written before 850, since a copy was consulted in the monastery of Leyre by Eulogius of Córdoba on his visit to Navarre between 848 and 850. It might have been written before 762, since it refers to Damascus as the capital of the Muslims and in that year the Abbasids moved the capital to Baghdad. It also refers in its prologue to events recorded in the Chronicle of 754, which may indicate that it was written after that date. Its precise dating of events is found in no other sources than the Chronicle of 754 and the Chronicle of 741.

The Storia is most probably of Mozarabic origin, that is, written by Christians living under Islamic rule in Spain. References to building projects in Toledo and Andújar may suggest either of those two places, more likely the latter, as its place of origin. Since the internal evidence for a Spanish provenance is confined to the prologue, it is possible that only that part was composed there and that the main body of the text was written elsewhere. Its content suggests the use of Greek sources. Comparable material on Islam can be found in the writings of Theophanes the Confessor and John of Damascus. The text in its finished form appears to have been brought by Mozarabs to Asturias and thence to Navarre. The surviving textual tradition can be traced to the monasteries of Albelda and San Millán in the Rioja.

== Textual history ==
The Storia exists in two recensions, a short one (A) and a long one (B). The short one is found in a letter from John of Seville to Paul Albar, the sixth in the surviving collection of Paul's correspondence. It is known from a single manuscript, Archivo Catedralicio de Córdoba, n° 1. It is probably a shortened version of the long recension. Possibly, it is a short summary of a lost common source, such as a Greek tract from before 750. It is unknown where or how John came upon the text he summarized.

The long recension is preserved in four manuscripts and there is a printed edition based on a now lost fifth manuscript. It circulated independently, but is not preserved as an independent text. Every surviving copy is inserted into another work. It was first incorporated by Eulogius into his Liber apologeticus martyrum between 857 and 859. In 883 in Asturias, it was incorporated into the Prophetic Chronicle. The four surviving manuscripts are:

- Codex Albeldensis (Real Biblioteca del Monasterio de San Lorenzo de El Escorial, MS d.I.2) of 975
- Codex Aemilianensis (Real Biblioteca del Monasterio de San Lorenzo de El Escorial, MS d.I.1) of 992 or 994
- Codex Rotensis (Biblioteca de la Real Academia de la Historia de Madrid, MS 78) of the early 11th century
- Biblioteca Nacional de Madrid, MS 8831 of the late 12th century

The only known manuscript of Eulogius' Liber apologeticus was discovered in the 16th century by Pedro Ponce de León and used for the edition of Ambrosio de Morales in 1791–1792, but is now lost. There are two slightly different versions of the long recension. The texts in the Albeldensis and Aemilianensis codices are almost identical. MS 8831 is a Castilian copy of the Rotensis and Eulogius' version bears more similarity to this version as well.

The short recension, only about a paragraph in length, is entitled Adnotatio Mammetis Arabum principis, or "A note on Muḥammad, chief of the Arabs". The long recension of the Storia is the longer of two Latin biographies of Muḥammad in the Codex Rotensis, the other being the Tultusceptru de libro domni Metobii. There it bears the title Storia de Mahometh (Story of Muḥammad). In the other three codices it is entitled Istoria de Mahomet (Story of Muḥammad). In his critical text, Manuel Díaz y Díaz assigns it the title Notitia de Mahmeth pseudo propheta (Notice of Muḥammad the false prophet). Ann Christys uses the title Life of Muḥammad.

== Synopsis ==
Page from the Codex Rotensis with the Storia starting at the bottom, following a genealogy of Muḥammad

The Storia is a polemic, caustic in tone, that takes facts from the traditional biography of Muḥammad and reframes them as criticism of Islam.

The Storia dates the rise of Muḥammad to the seventh year of the Emperor Heraclius and the year 656 of the Spanish era, that is, AD 618. It notes that this was during the time of Isidore of Seville and while Sisebut was reigning as king of the Visigoths. It connects two building projects with that time: the construction of a church over the tomb of Euphrasius in Andújar and the enlargement of the church of Saint Leocadia in Toledo.

According to the Storia, Muḥammad was an orphan raised by a widow. He was a usurer who by attending Christians gatherings became the wisest among the Arabs. Soon after he married his guardian, he was visited by a vulture that claimed to be the angel Gabriel and told him to present himself to the Arabs as a prophet. Thus, he turned them away from the worship of idols and ordered them to take up arms in his name. He defeated the armies of the Byzantine Empire and established himself in Damascus. He reigned for ten years, amending the law to allow himself to marry the divorcée of one of his followers. He composed psalms and hymns in order to enhance his status. He miraculously tamed a wild camel. Towards the end of his life, he predicted that he would be resurrected three days after his death. When this did not happen, his followers assumed that their presence was scaring off the angels and so they left his decomposing body unguarded, whereupon dogs began to eat it and they were forced to bury it. An annual slaughter of dogs was instituted among Muslims to avenge their prophet.

== Analysis ==
The Storia borrows from legends then current regarding the Antichrist and portrays Muḥammad as one of the false prophets predicted by the New Testament.

The author of the Storia had good knowledge of the traditional Islamic biography of Muḥammad. He knew that his subject was an orphan and a merchant; that he married his patroness, Khadīja; that he claimed revelations from Gabriel; that he opposed idolatry; that he was familiar with Christianity; that he led armies; and that he married Zaynab, the former wife of his adopted son Zayd. In referring to this last incident, the author directly translated a passage from the Qurʾān, specifically Sūra 33:37. This is the earliest Latin translation of any portion of the Qurʾān. The author in fact knew the titles of the chapters of the Qurʾān, which he used to mock them. The story of the wild camel is traditional but not Qurʾānic and can be found in Ibn Saʿd and Ibn Ḥanbal.

Each piece of information taken from the traditional biography is given a negative twist. As a merchant, he is depicted as a greedy usurer. His marriages are products of untamed lust. He turns his followers into warriors for personal gain. The angel that appears to him is nothing but the devil in disguise. The death of Muḥammad as depicted in the Storia has no correspondence with any Islamic tradition and is pure invention intended to disparage. The Syriac versions of the Baḥira legend and the Apology of al-Kindi do, however, refer to a false prophecy (not by Muḥammad himself) that he would rise again after three days. The Storia is the only source to have his body eaten by dogs, which is pure invention intended to disparage.

The conclusion of the Storia can be contrasted with that of the other biography of Muḥammad in the Codex Rotensis. The Storia ends by describing Muḥammad as "a prophet who committed not only his own soul, but those of many others, to hell". The Tultusceptru says that "his heart was turned away by the unclean spirit ... and so what was to be a vessel of Christ became a vessel of Mammon to the perdition of his soul" and "all who were converted to this error". While the Storia blames Muḥammad for leading his followers to Hell, the Tultusceptru treats him as a victim and a dupe.

== Bibliography ==
- Christys, Ann (2002). Christians in al-Andalus (711–1000). Routledge.
- Di Cesare, Michelina (2012). The Pseudo-historical Image of the Prophet Muhammad in Medieval Latin Literature: A Repertory. De Gruyter.
- Díaz y Díaz, Manuel C. (1970). "Los textos antimahometanos más antiguos en códices españoles". Archives d'histoire doctrinale et littéraire du Moyen Âge. 37: 149–168. JSTOR 44514635.
- Furtado, Rodrigo (2016). "The Chronica Prophetica in MS. Madrid, RAH Aem. 78". In Lucio Cristante; Vanni Veronesi (eds.). Forme di accesso al sapere in età tardoantica e altomedievale (PDF). Vol. VI. Edizioni Università di Trieste. pp. 75–100.
- Hoyland, Robert G. (1997). Seeing Islam As Others Saw It: A Survey and Evaluation of Christian, Jewish and Zoroastrian Writings on Early Islam. Darwin Press.
- Tolan, John V. (2010). "Eulogius of Cordova". In David Thomas; Alex Mallett (eds.). Christian-Muslim Relations: A Bibliographical History. Vol. 2 (900–1050). Brill. pp. 679–683.
- Tolan, John V. (2010). "Istoria de Mahomet". In David Thomas; Alex Mallett (eds.). Christian-Muslim Relations: A Bibliographical History. Vol. 2 (900–1050). Brill. pp. 721–722.
- Wolf, Kenneth Baxter (1990). "The Earliest Latin Lives of Muḥammad". In Michael Gervers; Ramzi Jibran Bikhazi (eds.). Conversion and Continuity: Indigenous Christian Communities in Islamic Lands, Eighth to Eighteenth Centuries. Pontifical Institute of Mediaeval Studies. pp. 89–101.
- Wolf, Kenneth Baxter (2014). "Counterhistory in the Earliest Latin Lives of Muhammad". In Christiane J. Gruber; Avinoam Shalem (eds.). The Image of the Prophet between Ideal and Ideology: A Scholarly Investigation – The Image of the Prophet Between Ideal and Ideology. De Gruyter. pp. 13–26. doi:10.1515/9783110312546.13. ISBN 978-3-11-031238-6.
- Wolf, Kenneth Baxter (2014). "Falsifying the Prophet: Muhammad at the Hands of His Earliest Christian Biographers in the West". In Martijn Icks; Eric Shiraev (eds.). Character Assassination throughout the Ages. Palgrave Macmillan. pp. 105–120. doi:10.1057/9781137344168_6. ISBN 978-1-349-48512-3.
- Yolles, Julian; Weiss, Jessica, eds. (2018). Medieval Latin Lives of Muhammad. Harvard University Press.
