= Criticism of Muhammad =

Criticisms of the main prophet of Islam

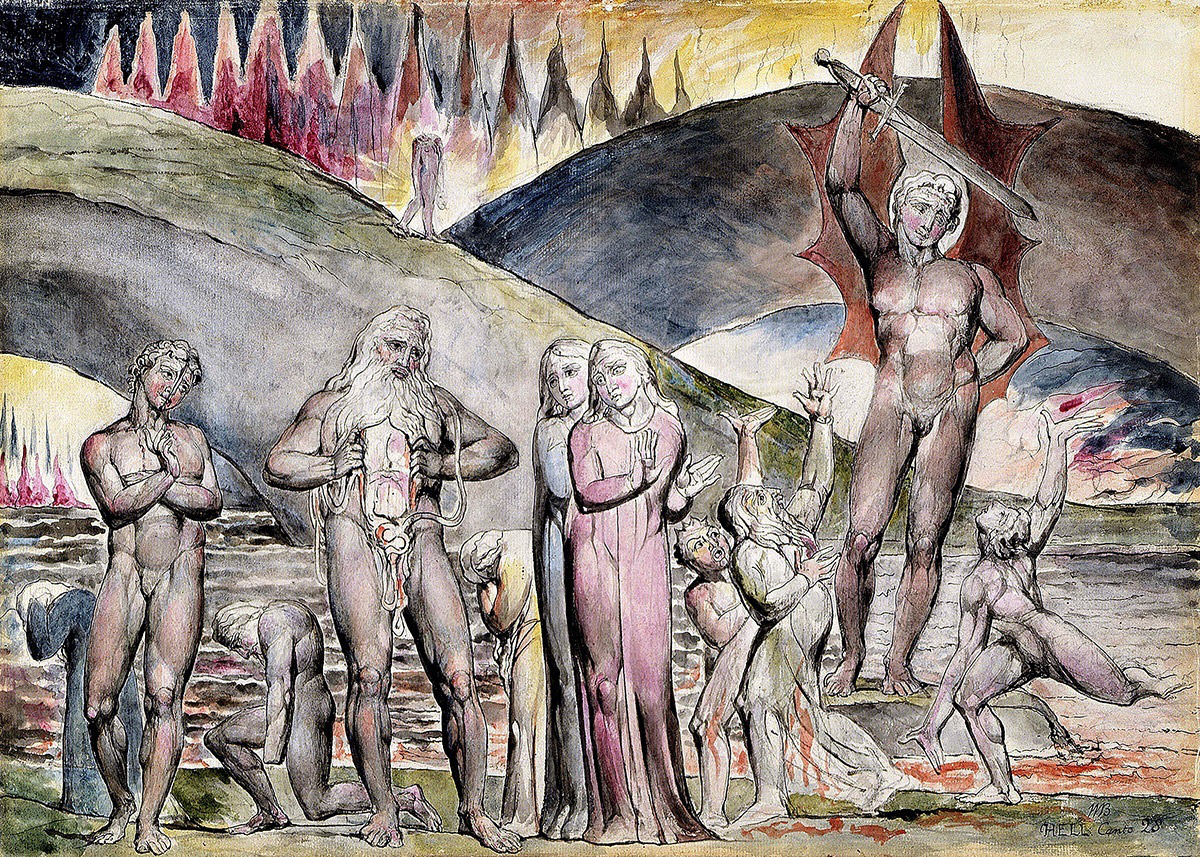
Dante's Inferno casts Muhammad in Hell, reflecting his negative image in the Christian world. Here, William Blake's illustration of Inferno depicts Muhammad pulling his chest open which has been sliced by a demon to symbolize his role as a "schismatic", since Islam was considered a heresy by Medieval Christians.

The first to criticize the Islamic prophet Muhammad were his non-Muslim Arab contemporaries, who decried him for preaching monotheism, and the Jewish tribes of Arabia, for what they claimed were unwarranted appropriation of Biblical narratives and figures and vituperation of the Jewish faith. For these reasons, medieval Jewish writers commonly referred to him by the derogatory nickname ha-Meshuggah (Hebrew: מְשֻׁגָּע, "the Madman" or "the Possessed").

During the Middle Ages, various Western and Byzantine Christian polemicists considered Muhammad to be a false prophet, the Antichrist, a heretic, Satan possessed by demons, a sexual deviant, a polygamist, and a charlatan. Thomas Aquinas criticized Muhammad's handling of doctrinal matters and promises of what Aquinas described as "carnal pleasure" in the afterlife.

Modern criticism by some Western scholars has raised questions about Muhammad’s prophetic claims, personal conduct, marriages, slave ownership, and mental state. (Note: Multiple references:) Criticism has also focused on his treatment of enemy captives, particularly the case of mass killing of men of the Banu Qurayza tribe in Medina. Muslim scholars often respond by emphasizing the historical context of 7th-century Arabia and Muhammad’s role in promoting justice and social reform. Some historians say the punishment of the Banu Qurayza reflected the norms of the time and was ordered by Sa'd ibn Mu'adh, though others question Muhammad’s role or the scale of the event.

== Points of contention ==
=== Muhammad's marriages ===
Muhammad's marriages have long provided another source of Western criticism of the moral character of the prophet.

— John Esposito, Islam: The Straight Path

One of the popular historical criticisms of Muhammad in the West has been his polygynous marriages. (Note: See for example William Muir, who says "Shortly after the death of Khadîja, the Prophet married again; but it was not till the mature age of fifty-four that he made the dangerous trial of polygamy, by taking Ayesha, yet a child, as the rival of Sauda. Once the natural limits of restraint were overpassed, Mahomet fell an easy prey to his strong passion for the sex. In his fifty-sixth year he married Haphsa; and the following year, in two succeeding months, Zeinab bint Khozeima, and Omm Salma. But his desires were not to be satisfied by the range of a harem already greater than was permitted to any of his followers; rather, as age advanced, they were stimulated to seek for new and varied indulgence. A few months after his nuptials with Zeinab and Omm Salma, the charms of a second Zeinab were by accident discovered too fully before the Prophet's admiring gaze. She was the wife of Zeid, his adopted son and bosom friend; but he was unable to smother the flame she had kindled in his breast; and, by divine command she was taken to his bed. In the same year he married a seventh wife, and also a concubine. And at last, when he was full threescore years of age, no fewer than three new wives, besides Mary the Coptic slave, were within the space of seven months added to his already well filled harem. The bare recital of these facts may justify the saying of Ibn Abbâs,—"Verily the chiefest among the Moslems (meaning Mahomet) was the foremost of them in his passion for women;"—a fatal example imitated too readily by his followers, who adopt the Prince of Medîna, rather than the Prophet of Mecca, for their pattern." Muir, W. (1861). The Life of Mahomet (Vol. 4, pp. 309–11). London: Smith, Elder and Co.) According to American historian John Esposito, the Semitic cultures in general permitted polygamy (for example, the practice could be found in biblical and postbiblical Judaism); it was particularly a common practice among Arabs, especially among nobles and leaders.

Muslims have often pointed out that Muhammad married Khadija bint Khuwaylid (a widow whose age is estimated to have been 40), when he was 25 years old, and remained monogamous to her for more than 24 years until she died. Norman Geisler frames Muhammad's marriages as a question of moral inconsistency, since Muhammad was unwilling to abide by the revealed limit of four wives that he enjoined on other men. Quran 33:50 states that the limit of four wives did not apply to Muhammad.

Muslims have generally responded that the marriages of Muhammad were not conducted to satisfy worldly desires or lusts, but rather they were done for a higher purpose and due to God's command. Medieval Sufi, Ibn Arabi, sees Muhammad's relationships with his wives as a proof of his superiority amongst men. John Esposito explains that polygamy served several purposes, such as strengthening political alliances among Arab chiefs and providing protection through marriage to the widows of companions who had died in combat.

==== Aisha ====
In classical sources, Aisha was six or seven years old when betrothed to Muhammad, with the marriage being consummated when she reached the age of nine or ten years old. Some modern sources, however, state her age to be twelve or older. (Note: Multiple references:) Christian polemicists and orientalists attacked what they deemed to be Muhammad's deviant sexuality, for having married an underage (Note: Islamic sources of the classical era differ among themselves about her precise age at the time of marriage and consummation but converge on her pre-menarcheal status. Ibn Sa'd's corpus of biography varies her age at the time of marriage between six and seven, and holds her age at consummation to be nine; al-Tabari notes that Aisha stayed with her parents even after the marriage, which would be consummated only at nine years of age upon her reaching sexual maturity but in another place, remarks her to have been born before the dawning of Islam (610 C.E), which translates to an age of about twelve or more at marriage; Ibn Hisham's biography of Muhammad notes her to have been ten years old at consummation. Aisha herself recollected to have been married at seven years of age — as transmitted in Sahih al-Bukhari —, and would leverage her being the only virgin-wife of Muhammad to attract support in the successional disputes that ensued upon Muhammad's death. Spellberg finds attempts in proving the "real age" of Aisha at the time of marriage (or consummation) as an exercise in futility; Kecia Ali agrees. Scholars have noted such underage marriages to be common in the premodern world and such exclusive focus on the young age of Aisha might have been a ploy to assert that Aisha was born to a Muslim family, who deserved greater reverence.) girl; early twentieth-century criticisms came from the likes of Harvey Newcomb and David Samuel Margoliouth while others were mild, choosing to explain how the "heat of tropics" made "girls of Arabia" mature at an early age. While most Muslims defended the traditionally accepted age of Aisha with vigor emphasizing cultural relativism, the political dimensions of the marriage, Aisha's "exceptional qualities" etc., some modern scholars (Note: However, such revisionism was critiqued by conservative scholars.) chose to re-calculate the age and fix it at late adolescence as a tool of social reform in their homelands or to appeal to different audiences. (Note: One such attempt corroborates information known about her older sister Asma to suggest that Aisha was over thirteen — probably between seventeen and nineteen — at the time of her marriage.) In the late twentieth century, opponents of Islam have used Aisha's age at marriage to criticize Muhammad and to explain the great prevalence of child marriage in Muslim societies.

From mid-20th century, amidst growing concerns of Islamic extremism, as Muslim societies and Islam itself came under renewed scrutiny, pointed criticisms of Aisha's young age at marriage began to be abundant; this has since prompted some (Note: Ali finds an exception in "traditional S. Asian biographers" who maintain outright frankness in noting the "practicalities" of marrying a virgin girl.) Muslim scholars to attempt to contextualize the traditionally accepted age of Aisha with renewed vigor emphasizing on anachronism and the political dimensions of the marriage, often at the expense of historical accuracy. (Note: Ali notes the polarizing environment to have prompted even scholars and popular authors from the West to incorporate apologetics premised on anachronism and political implications, often at the cost of historical accuracy.) Since the late-twentieth century, polemicists have used Aisha's age to accuse Muhammad of pedophilia and to explain a reported higher prevalence of child marriage in Muslim societies.

==== Zaynab bint Jahsh ====
Western criticism has focused especially on the marriage of Muhammad to his first cousin Zaynab bint Jahsh, the divorced wife of Zayd ibn Harithah, an ex-slave whom Muhammad had adopted as his son. Orientalists and critics such as Edward Sell have criticized the marriage, questioning its motivations and implications, while some like William St. Clair Tisdall have viewed certain aspects, such as the associated revelation, through a lens of self-interest. According to Tabari, taken from Al-Waqidi, Muhammad went in search of Zayd. A curtain covering the doorway had been moved by the wind, revealing Zaynab in her chamber. Zayd subsequently found her unattractive and divorced Zaynab.

In her 2006 biography of Muhammad, Karen Armstrong contextualizes this event by portraying Zaynab as a devout woman and a talented leather-worker who dedicated the earnings from her craft to charity. Muhammad’s reported affection for her is said to have arisen during an unplanned visit to her home when Zayd was away and Zaynab happened to be dressed more revealingly than usual.

According to William Montgomery Watt, Zaynab herself was working for marriage with Muhammad and was not happy being married to Zayd. Watt also places doubt on the story outlined by Al-Waqidi and states that it should be taken with a "grain of salt." According to Watt, Zaynab was either thirty-five or thirty-eight years old at the time and that the story initially outlined by Al-Waqidi in which he detailed Muhammad's incident with Zaynab during the absence of Zayd may have been tampered with in the course of transmission.

According to Mazheruddin Siddiqi, Zaynab as the cousin of Muhammad was seen by him many times before her marriage to Zayd. Siddiqi states: "He [Muhammad] had seen her many times before but he was never attracted to her physical beauty, else he would have married her, instead of insisting on her that she should marry Zaid."

In the book "The Wives of the Messenger of Allah" by Muhammad Swaleh Awadh, it is noted that Zaynab married Muhammad during the fifth year of Hijra in Dhu al-Qadah. This marriage was unconventional and disapproved by the standards of pre-Islamic Arabia, due to the prevailing belief that adopted sons were considered as true sons, making marriage to an adopted son's former wife uncommon, even after divorce.

Munafiqs of Medina used the marriage to discredit Muhammad on two fronts, one of double standards as she was his fifth wife, while everyone else was restricted to four, and marrying his adopted son's wife. This was exactly what Muhammad feared and was initially hesitant in marrying her. The Qur'an, however, confirmed that this marriage was valid. Thus Muhammad, confident of his faith in the Qur'an, proceeded to reject the existing Arabic norms. When Zaynab's waiting period from her divorce was complete, Muhammad married her. In reference to this incident, Quran 33:37 says:

Behold! Thou didst say to one who had received the grace of Allah and thy favour: "Retain thou (in wedlock) thy wife, and fear Allah." But thou didst hide in thy heart that which Allah was about to make manifest: thou didst fear the people, but it is more fitting that thou shouldst fear Allah. Then when Zaid had dissolved (his marriage) with her, with the necessary (formality), We joined her in marriage to thee: in order that (in future) there may be no difficulty to the Believers in (the matter of) marriage with the wives of their adopted sons, when the latter have dissolved with the necessary (formality) (their marriage) with them. And Allah's command must be fulfilled.

Following the revelation of this verse, Muhammad rejected the prevailing Arab customs that prohibited marrying the wives of adopted sons, which was considered taboo and culturally inappropriate. Thereafter the legal status of adoption was not recognised under Islam. Zayd reverted to being known by his original name of "Zayd ibn Harithah" instead of "Zayd ibn Muhammad". Watt interprets this event as part of Muhammad’s broader role as a social reformer, aimed at ending the pre-Islamic practice of equating adopted sons with biological ones. He also notes the political significance of the marriage, rejects claims of sensual motivation, and argues that criticism arose more from cultural norms than from actual moral concerns.

=== Ownership of slaves ===
According to sociologist Rodney Stark, "the fundamental problem facing Muslim theologians vis-à-vis the morality of slavery" is that Muhammad himself engaged in activities such as purchasing, selling, and owning slaves, and that his followers saw him as the perfect example to emulate. Stark contrasts Islam with Christianity, writing that Christian theologians wouldn't have been able to "work their way around the biblical acceptance of slavery" if Jesus had owned slaves, as Muhammad did.

Forough Jahanbaksh notes that Muhammad never preached the abolition of slavery as a doctrine, although he did moderate the age-old institution of slavery, which was also accepted and endorsed by the other monotheistic religions, Christianity and Judaism, and was a well-established custom of the pre-Islamic world. According to Murray Gordon, Muhammad saw it "as part of the natural order of things". While Muhammad did improve the condition of slaves, and exhorted his followers to treat them with kindness and compassion, and encouraged freeing of slaves, he still did not completely abolish the practice.

His decrees greatly limited those who could be enslaved and under what circumstances (including barring Muslims from enslaving other Muslims), allowed slaves to achieve their freedom and made freeing slaves a virtuous act. Some slaves earned respectable incomes and achieved considerable power, although elite slaves still remained in the power of their owners. Muhammad established a system to encourage manumission, and several of his companions, including Abu Bakr and Uthman ibn Affan, are recorded to have freed thousands of slaves, often purchasing them for this purpose. Many early converts to Islam were the poor and former slaves like Bilal ibn Rabah al-Habashi.

=== Treatment of enemies ===
Norman Geisler accuses Muhammad of "mercilessness" towards the Jewish tribes of Medina. Geisler also argues that Muhammad "had no aversion to politically expedient assassinations", "was not indisposed to breaking promises when he found it advantageous" and "engaged in retaliation towards those who mocked him." The Orientalist William Muir, in assessing Muhammad's character, described him as cruel and faithless in dealing with his enemies.

Jean de Sismondi suggests that Muhammad's successive attacks on powerful Jewish colonies located near Medina in Arabia were due to religious differences between them, and he claimed that he subjected the defeated to punishments that were not typical in other wars.

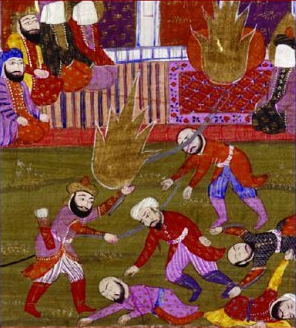
Miniature painting depicting the execution of the Banu Qurayza, from a 19th-century manuscript illustrated by Muhammad Rafi Bazil.

Muhammad has been often criticized outside of the Islamic world for his treatment of the Jewish tribes of Medina. An example is the mass killing of the men of the Banu Qurayza, a Jewish tribe of Medina. The tribe was accused of having engaged in treasonous agreements with the enemies besieging Medina in the Battle of the Trench in 627.

After the Qurayẓah were found to be complicit with the enemy during the Battle of the Trench, the Muslim general Sa'd ibn Mu'adh ordered the men to be put to death and the women and children to be enslaved. Moreover, Muslims believe that the Prophet did not order the execution of the Jews of Medina, but many Western historians believe that he must have been, at the very least, informed of it. Regardless, "this tragic episode cast a shadow upon the relations between the two communities for many centuries, even though the Jews, a "People of the Book" [...] generally enjoyed the protection of their lives, property, and religion under Islamic rule and fared better in the Muslim world than in the West."

According to Norman Stillman, the incident cannot be judged by present-day moral standards. Citing Deut. 20:13–14 as an example, Stillman states that the slaughter of adult males and the enslavement of women and children—though no doubt causing bitter suffering—was common practice throughout the ancient world. According to Rudi Paret, adverse public opinion was more a point of concern to Muhammad when he had some date palms cut down during a siege, than after this incident. Esposito also argues that in Muhammad's time, traitors were executed and points to similar situations in the Bible. John Esposito notes that Muhammad’s motivation was primarily political rather than racial or theological, aiming to unify Arabia under Muslim leadership and establish stable governance.

Some historians, such as W.N. Arafat and Barakat Ahmad, have disputed the historicity of the incident. Ahmad argues that only the leading members of the tribe were killed. Arafat argued based on accounts by Malik ibn Anas and Ibn Hajar that Ibn Ishaq gathered information from descendants of the Qurayza Jews, who exaggerated the details of the incident. He also maintained that not all adult males were killed but only those who actually fought in the battle; however, William Montgomery Watt described this argument as "not entirely convincing."

Rabbi Samuel Rosenblatt has said that Muhammad's policies were not directed exclusively against Jews (referring to his conflicts with Jewish tribes) and that Muhammad was more severe with his pagan Arab kinsmen.

=== Religious syncretism and compromise ===
John Mason Neale (1818–1866) accused Muhammad of pandering "to the passions of his followers", arguing that he constructed Islam out of a mixture of beliefs that provided something for everyone. (Note: "The Christians were conciliated by the acknowledgment of our LORD as the Greatest of Prophets; the Jews, by the respectful mention of Moses and their other Lawgivers; the idolaters, by the veneration which the Impostor professed for the Temple of Mecca, and the black stone which it contained; and the Chaldeans, by the pre-eminence which he gives to the ministrations of the Angel Gabriel, and his whole scheme of the Seven Heavens. To a people devoted to the gratification of their passions and addicted to Oriental luxury, he appealed, not unsuccessfully, by the promise of a Paradise whose sensual delights were unbounded, and the permission of a free exercise of pleasures in this world.")

Thomas Patrick Hughes (b. 1838) said that the Hajj represents an expedient compromise between Muhammad's monotheistic principles and Arabian paganism.

Islamic scholar Yasir Qadhi stated that while non-Muslims believe Muhammad "adopted certain things from paganism and then added his own two cents for us", he instead states that Muhammad resurrected the original teachings of the Islamic prophet Ibrahim, citing an Islamic narrative of a man named Amr ibn Luhay who later introduced paganism in Arabia. Muḥammad ibn ʻAbd Allāh Azraqī mentions the story in his book titled Kitāb akhbār Makkah.

=== Psychological and medical condition ===
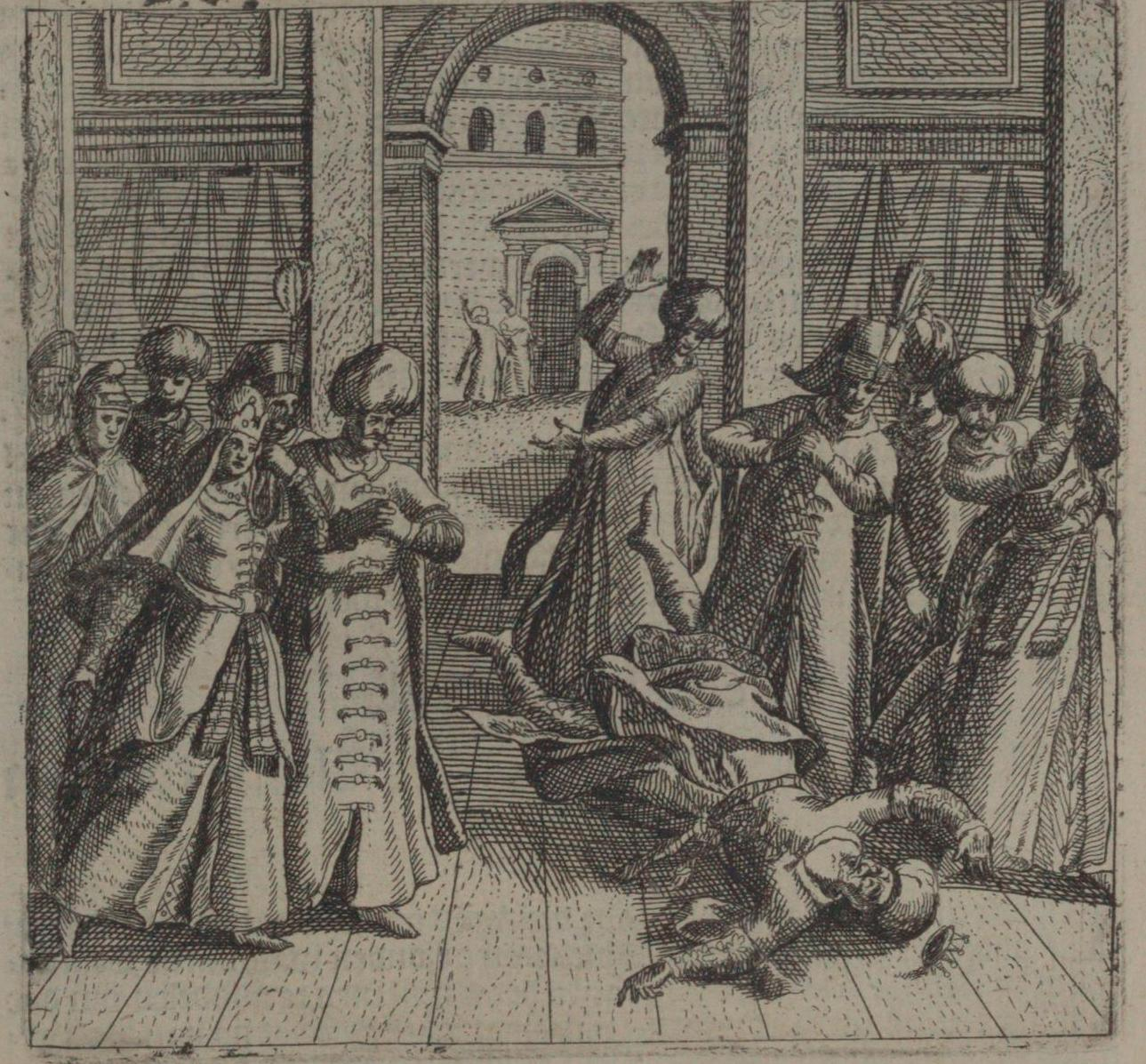
Muhammad depicted as having a seizure (1640)

Philip Schaff (1819–1893) noted that Muhammad's revelations were accompanied by intense physical symptoms.

According to Temkin, the first attribution of epileptic seizures to Muhammad comes from the 8th century Byzantine historian Theophanes who wrote that Muhammad's wife "was very much grieved that she, being of noble descent, was tied to such a man, who was not only poor but epileptic as well." In the Middle Ages, the general perception of one who suffered epilepsy was that of an unclean and incurable wretch who might be possessed by the devil. The political hostility between Islam and Christianity contributed to the continuation of the accusation of epilepsy throughout the Middle Ages. The Christian minister Archdeacon Humphrey Prideaux gave the following description of Muhammad's visions:

He pretended to receive all his revelations from the Angel Gabriel, and that he was sent from God of purpose to deliver them unto him. And whereas he was subject to the falling-sickness, whenever the fit was upon him, he pretended it to be a Trance, and that the Angel Gabriel comes from God with some Revelations unto him.

Some modern Western scholars also have a skeptical view of Muhammad's seizures. Frank R. Freemon states Muhammad had "conscious control over the course of the spells and can pretend to be in a religious trance." During the nineteenth century, as Islam was no longer a political or military threat to Western society, and perceptions of epilepsy changed, the theological and moral associations with epilepsy were removed; epilepsy was now viewed as a medical disorder. Nineteenth-century orientalist Margoliouth claimed that Muhammad suffered from epilepsy and even occasionally faked it for effect.

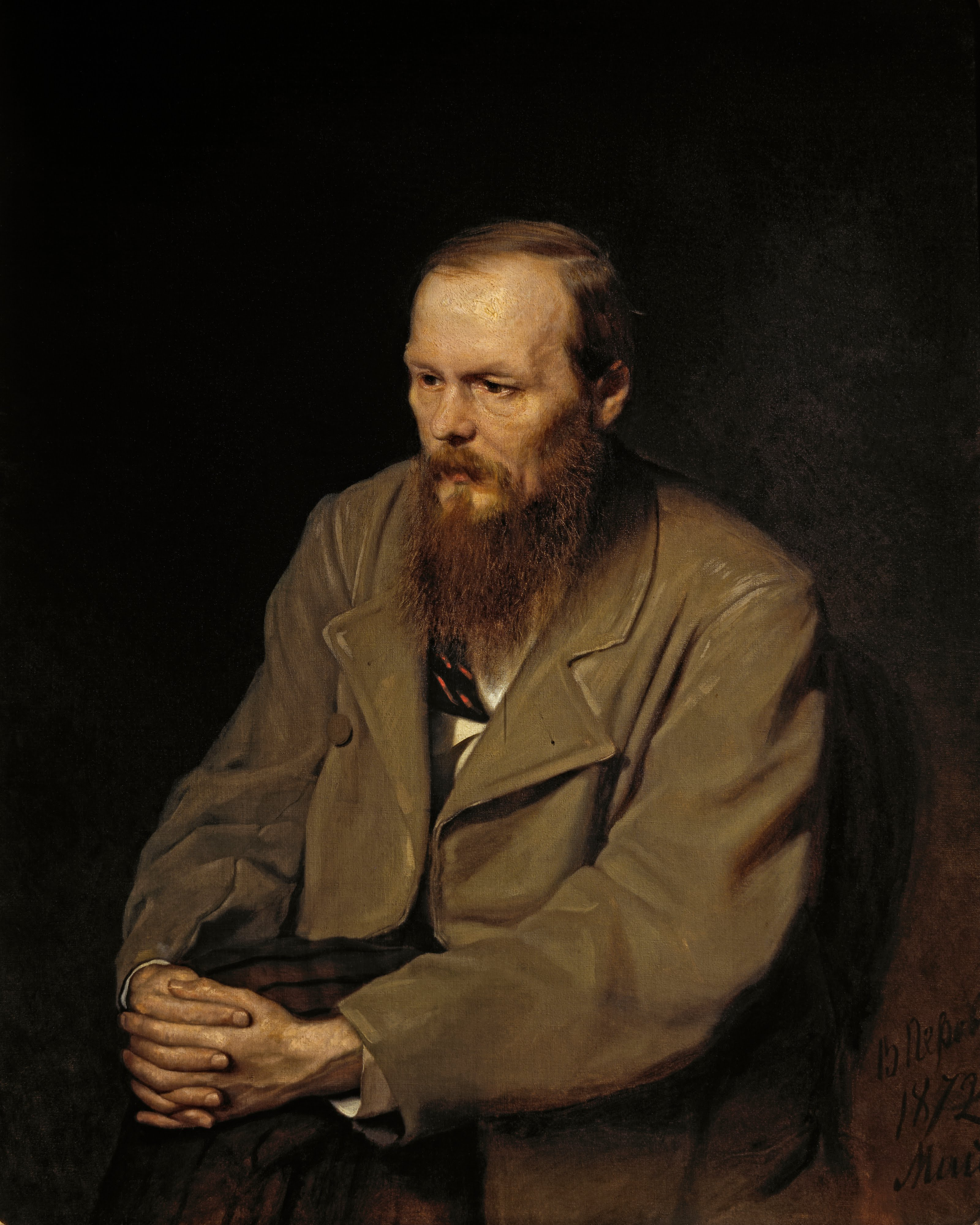
A portrait of Fyodor Dostoevsky in 1872, painted by Vasily Perov

Sprenger attributes Muhammad's revelations to epileptic fits or a "paroxysm of cataleptic insanity." In Schaff's view, Muhammad's "early and frequent epileptic fits" provided "some light on his revelations." The most famous epileptic of the 19th century, Fyodor Dostoyevsky (1821–1881) wrote that epileptic attacks have an inspirational quality; he said they are "a supreme exaltation of emotional subjectivity" in which time stands still. Dostoyevsky claimed that his own attacks were similar to those of Muhammad: "Probably it was of such an instant, that the epileptic Mahomet was speaking when he said that he had visited all the dwelling places of Allah within a shorter time than it took for his pitcher full of water to empty itself."

In an essay discussing views on Muhammad's psychology, Franz Bul (1903) is said to have noted that "hysterical natures find unusual difficulty and often complete inability to distinguish the false from the true," regarding this as "the safest way to interpret the strange inconsistencies in the life of the Prophet." In the same essay, Duncan Black Macdonald (1911) is credited with stating that "fruitful investigation of the Prophet's life (should) proceed upon the assumption that he was fundamentally a pathological case."

Modern Western scholars of Islam have rejected the diagnosis of epilepsy. Tor Andrae rejects the idea that the inspired state is pathological attributing it to a scientifically superficial and hasty theory arguing that those who consider Muhammad epileptic should consider all types of semi-conscious and trance-like states, occasional loss of consciousness, and similar conditions as epileptic attacks. Andrae writes that "[i]f epilepsy is to denote only those severe attacks which involve serious consequences for the physical and mental health, then the statement that Mohammad suffered from epilepsy must be emphatically rejected." Caesar Farah suggests that "[t]hese insinuations resulted from the 19th-century infatuation with scientifically superficial theories of medical psychology." Noth, in the Encyclopedia of Islam, states that such accusations were a typical feature of medieval European Christian polemic.

Maxime Rodinson says that it is most probable that Muhammad's condition was of the sort that was found in many mystics rather than epilepsy. Fazlur Rahman refutes epileptic fits for the following reasons: Muhammad's condition begins with his career at the age of 40; according to the tradition seizures are invariably associated with the revelation and never occur by itself. Lastly, a sophisticated society like the Meccan or Medinese would have identified epilepsy clearly and definitely.

William Montgomery Watt also disagrees with the epilepsy diagnosis, saying that "there are no real grounds for such a view." Elaborating, he says that "epilepsy leads to physical and mental degeneration, and there are no signs of that in Muhammad." He then goes further and states that Muhammad was psychologically sound in general: "he (Muhammad) was clearly in full possession of his faculties to the very end of his life." Watt concludes by stating "It is incredible that a person subject to epilepsy, or hysteria, or even ungovernable fits of emotion, could have been the active leader of military expeditions, or the cool far-seeing guide of a city-state and a growing religious community; but all this we know Muhammad to have been."

According to Seyyed Hossein Nasr, Muhammad's sense of fairness and justice was famous, even before his claim of prophet-hood, as people called him al-Amin, the trusted one.

Frank R. Freemon (1976) argues that the above reasons given by modern biographers of Muhammad in rejection of epilepsy come from the widespread misconceptions about the various types of epilepsy. In his differential diagnosis, Freemon rejects schizophrenic hallucinations, (Note: Freemon starts his own differential diagnosis by arguing that "one must remember that Muhammad's inspired followers lived closely with him in his early and unsuccessful ministry; these same individuals demonstrated brilliant leadership of the explosively expanding Islamic state after his death". He thus rejects schizophrenic hallucinations thesis arguing that the blunted affect of the schizophrenic can hardly inspire the tenacious loyalty of the early followers. "It is also unlikely that a person with loose associations and other elements of schizophrenic thought disorder could guide the political and military fortunes of the early Islamic state.") drug-induced mental changes such as might occur after eating plants containing hallucinogenic chemicals, (Note: Freemon does so for two reasons: It can not justify the rapid, almost paroxysmal onset of these spells. Furthermore, without personal conviction of the reality of his visions, Muhammad could not have convinced his astute followers.) transient ischemic attacks, (Note: According to Freemon, "Too many of these spells occurred over too long a period of time to suggest transient ischemic attacks, and no neurologic deficits outside the mental sphere were observed.") hypoglycemia, (Note: Freemon argues that long duration, absence of worsening, and paroxysmal onset make hypoglycemia unlikely) labyrinthitis, Ménière's disease, or other inner ear maladies. (Note: He argues that absence of vertigo rules out labyrinthitis, Meniere's disease, or other inner ear maladies.)

Freemon concludes that if one were forced to make a diagnosis, psychomotor seizures of temporal lobe epilepsy would be the most tenable one, although our lack of scientific as well as historical knowledge makes unequivocal decision impossible. Freemon cites evidence supporting and opposing this diagnosis. (Note: Supporting this diagnosis, he cites paroxysmal onset, failing to the ground with loss of conscious, autonomic dysfunction and hallucinatory imagery. On the evidences opposing the diagnosis he mentions the late age of onset, lack of recognition as seizures by his contemporaries, and lastly poetic, organized statements in immediate postictal state.) In the end, Freemon points out that a medical diagnosis should not ignore Muhammad's moral message because it is just as likely, perhaps more likely, for God to communicate with a person in an abnormal state of mind. (Note: Freemon explains this by quoting William James: "Just as our primary wide-awake consciousness throws open our senses to the touch of things material, so it is logically conceivable that if there be higher spiritual agencies that can directly touch us, the psychological condition of their doing so might be our possession of a subconscious region which alone should yield access to them. The hubbub of the waking life might close a door which in the dreamy subliminal might remain ajar or open.")

From a Muslim point of view, Freemon says, Muhammed's mental state at the time of revelation was unique and is not therefore amenable to medical or scientific discourse. Muslim neurologist GM. S. Megahed, criticized Freemon's article, arguing that there are no scientific explanations for many religious phenomena and that, if Muhammad's message is a result of psychomotor seizures then by the same basis Moses's and Jesus's messages must also result from psychomotor seizures. In response, Freemon attributed such negative reactions to his article to the general misconceptions about epilepsy as a demeaning condition. Freemon said that he did plan to write an article on the inspirational spells of St. Paul, but the existence of such misconceptions caused him to cancel it.

=== Legacy ===
Some scholars claim that following Muhammad's death, the Muslim community who were joined together by the unity of the faith became "leaderless" and a "haphazard" group. In the absence of established dynastic traditions and political customs, divisions emerged among Muslims. Muhammad did not compile the Quran into a single text or his prophetic tradition during his lifetime; the Quran was compiled into book form during Uthman's Caliphate, and the hadith were collected and codified by scholars and companions in the 8th–9th centuries.

According to both Sunni and Shia Muslims, on his way back from his last pilgrimage to Mecca, Muhammad stopped in a place called Ghadir Khumm, and appointed his cousin Ali as his executor of his last will and his Wali. The word Wali was interpreted differently by Sunni and Shia Muslims. Shia believes Muhammad explicitly appointed Ali as his successor at the location. Shia also believe Muhammad's Ahl al-Bayt, are the trusted collectors and transmitters of Muhammad's ahadith and trusted interpreters of Quran.

Muhammad reportedly stated that leadership was to remain within his own tribe, the Quraysh, a directive often seen as a pragmatic effort to preserve tribal unity but interpreted by some modern scholars as introducing a hierarchical structure into Islam. Christophe Jaffrelot argues that this contributed to the formation of a hereditary elite led by Muhammad's family and descendants (the Ahlul Bayt and sayyids), followed by his clan (Banu Hashim) then his tribe, the Quraysh.

== Muhammad's personal motivations ==
=== 19th century and early 20th century ===
William Muir, like many other 19th-century scholars divides Muhammad's life into two periods—Meccan and Medinan. He asserts that "in the Meccan period of [Muhammad's] life there certainly can be traced no personal ends or unworthy motives," painting him as a man of good faith and a genuine reformer. However, that all changed after the Hijra, according to Muir. "There [in Medina] temporal power, aggrandisement, and self-gratification mingled rapidly with the grand object of the Prophet's life, and they were sought and attained by just the same instrumentality." From that point on, he accuses Muhammad of manufacturing "messages from heaven" in order to justify a lust for women and reprisals against enemies, among other sins.

Philip Schaff says that "in the earlier part of his life he [Muhammad] was a sincere reformer and enthusiast, but after the establishment of his kingdom a slave of ambition for conquest" and describes him as "a slave of sensual passion."

D.S. Margoliouth, another 19th-century scholar, sees Muhammad as a charlatan who beguiled his followers with techniques like those used by fraudulent mediums today. He has expressed a view that Muhammad faked his religious sincerity, playing the part of a messenger from God like a man in a play, adjusting his performances to create an illusion of spirituality. He viewed Muhammad's behavior as opportunistic, prioritizing political ends over consistent doctrine.

=== Late 20th century ===
According to William Montgomery Watt and Richard Bell, recent writers have generally dismissed the idea that Muhammad deliberately deceived his followers, arguing that Muhammad "was absolutely sincere and acted in complete good faith". According to Nasr,

Like Jesus Christ, Muhammad loved spiritual poverty and was also close to the economically poor, living very simply even after he had become "the ruler of a whole world." He was also always severe with himself and emphasized that, if exertion in the path of God (al-jihād; commonly translated as "holy war") can sometimes mean fighting to preserve one's life and religion, the greater jihad is to fight against the dispersing tendencies of the concupiscent soul.

Modern secular historians generally decline to address the question of whether the messages Muhammad reported being revealed to him were from "his unconscious, the collective unconscious functioning in him, or from some divine source", but they acknowledge that the material came from "beyond his conscious mind." Watt says that sincerity does not directly imply correctness: In contemporary terms, Muhammad might have mistaken for divine revelation his own unconscious. William Montgomery Watt states:

Only a profound belief in himself and his mission explains Muhammad's readiness to endure hardship and persecution during the Meccan period when from a secular point of view there was no prospect of success. Without sincerity how could he have won the allegiance and even devotion of men of strong and upright character like Abu-Bakr and 'Umar ? ... There is thus a strong case for holding that Muhammad was sincere. If in some respects he was mistaken, his mistakes were not due to deliberate lying or imposture. ...the important point is that the message was not the product of Muhammad's conscious mind. He believed that he could easily distinguish between his own thinking and these revelations. His sincerity in this belief must be accepted by the modern historian, for this alone makes credible the development of a great religion. The further question, however, whether the messages came from Muhammad's unconscious, or the collective unconscious functioning in him, or from some divine source, is beyond the competence of the historian.

Rudi Paret agrees, writing that "Muhammad was not a deceiver," and Welch also holds that "the really powerful factor in Muhammad's life and the essential clue to his extraordinary success was his unshakable belief from beginning to end that he had been called by God. A conviction such as this, which, once firmly established, does not admit of the slightest doubt, exercises an incalculable influence on others. The certainty with which he came forward as the executor of God's will gave his words and ordinances an authority that proved finally compelling."

Bernard Lewis, another modern historian, commenting on the common Western Medieval view of Muhammad as a self-seeking impostor, states that

The modern historian will not readily believe that so great and significant a movement was started by a self-seeking impostor. Nor will he be satisfied with a purely supernatural explanation, whether it postulates aid of divine or diabolical origin; rather, like Gibbon, will he seek 'with becoming submission, to ask not indeed what were the first, but what were the secondary causes of the rapid growth' of the new faith.

Watt rejects the idea that Muhammad's moral behavior deteriorated after he migrated to Medina. He argues that "it is based on too facile a use of the principle that all power corrupts and absolute power corrupts absolutely". Watt interprets incidents in the Medinan period in such a way that they mark "no failure in Muhammad to live to his ideals and no lapse from his moral principles."

== History of criticism ==
=== During Middle Ages ===
The earliest documented Christian knowledge of Muhammad stems from Byzantine sources, written shortly after Muhammad's death in 632. In the Doctrina Jacobi nuper baptizati, a dialogue between a recent Christian convert and several Jews, one participant writes that his brother "wrote to [him] saying that a deceiving prophet has appeared amidst the Saracens". Another participant in the Doctrina replies about Muhammad: "He is deceiving. For do prophets come with sword and chariot?, …[Y]ou will discover nothing true from the said prophet except human bloodshed". Another Greek source for Muhammad is Theophanes the Confessor, a 9th-century writer. The earliest Syriac source is the 7th-century writer John bar Penkaye.

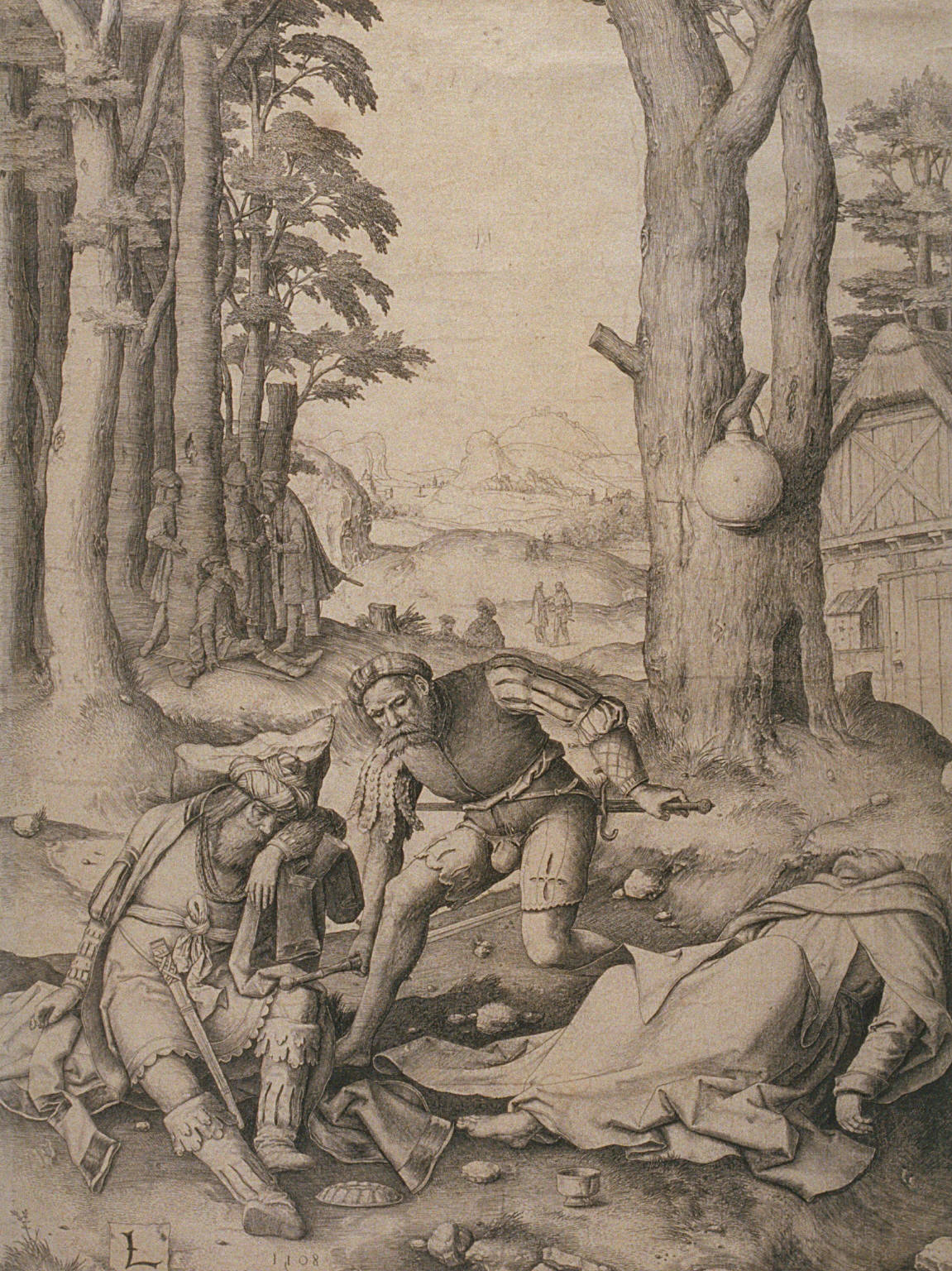
Muhammed and the Monk Sergius (Bahira), 1508, by Dutch artist Lucas van Leyden. In early Christian criticism, it was claimed that Bahira was a heretical monk whose errant views inspired the Qur'an.

One Christian who came under the early dominion of the Islamic Caliphate was John of Damascus (c. 676–749 AD), who was familiar with Islam and Arabic. The second chapter of his book, The Fount of Wisdom, titled "Concerning Heresies", presents a series of discussions between Christians and Muslims. John claimed that an Arian monk (whom he did not know was Bahira) influenced Muhammad and the writer viewed the Islamic doctrines as nothing more than a hodgepodge culled from the Bible.

Among the first sources representing Muhammad is the polemical work "Concerning Heresy" (Perì hairéseōn) of John of Damascus, translated from Greek into Latin. In this manuscript, the Syrian priest represents Muhammad as a "false prophet," and an "Antichrist". Some demonstrate that Muhammad was pointed out in this manuscript as "Mamed", but this study was corrected by Ahlam Sbaihat who affirmed that it is the form ΜΩΑΜΕΘ (Moameth) which is mentioned in this manuscript. The phoneme h and the gemination of m do not exist in Greek so it has disappeared from John's uses.

From the 9th century onwards, highly negative biographies of Muhammad were written in Latin, such as the one by Álvaro of Córdoba proclaiming him the Antichrist. Since the 7th century, Muhammad and his name have been connected to several stereotypes. Many sources mentioned exaggerated and sometimes wrong stereotypes. These stereotypes are born in the East but adopted by or developed in Western cultures. These references played a principal role in introducing Muhammad and his religion to the West as the false prophet, Saracen prince or deity, the Biblical beast, a schismatic from Christianity and a satanic creature, and the Antichrist.

Many early former Muslims such as Ibn al-Rawandi, Al-Ma'arri, and Abu Isa al-Warraq were religious skeptics, and philosophers who criticized Islam, the authority and reliability of the Qu'ran, Muhammad's morality, and his claims to be a prophet.

The Quran also mentions critics of Muhammad; for example Quran 25:4-6 says the critics complained that Muhammad was passing off what others were telling him as revelations:

The disbelievers say, "This Quran is nothing but a fabrication which he made up with the help of others." Their claim is totally unjustified and untrue! And they say, "These revelations are only ancient fables which he has had written down, and they are rehearsed to him morning and evening."

During the 12th century Peter the Venerable, who saw Muhammad as the precursor to the Anti-Christ and the successor of Arius, ordered the translation of the Qur'an into Latin (Lex Mahumet pseudoprophete) and the collection of information on Muhammad so that Islamic teachings could be refuted by Christian scholars. During the 13th century a series of works by European scholars such as Pedro Pascual, Ricoldo de Monte Croce, and Ramon Llull depicted Muhammad as an Antichrist and argued that Islam was a Christian heresy.

According to Hossein Nasr, the earliest European literature often refers to Muhammad unfavorably. A few learned circles of Middle Ages Europe – primarily Latin-literate scholars – had access to fairly extensive biographical material about Muhammad. They interpreted the biography through a Christian religious filter, one that viewed Muhammad as a person who seduced the Saracens into his submission under religious guise. Popular European literature of the time portrayed Muhammad as though he were worshipped by Muslims, similar to an idol or a heathen god.

In later ages, Muhammad came to be seen as a schismatic: Brunetto Latini's 13th century Li livres dou tresor represents him as a former monk and cardinal, and Dante's Divine Comedy (Inferno, Canto 28), written in the early 1300s, puts Muhammad and his son-in-law, Ali, in Hell "among the sowers of discord and the schismatics, being lacerated by devils again and again."

Some medieval ecclesiastical writers portrayed Muhammad as possessed by Satan, a "precursor of the Antichrist" or the Antichrist himself.

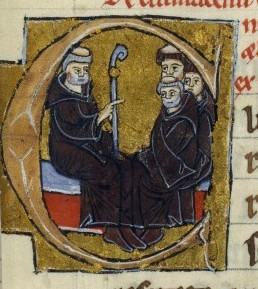
Peter the Venerable, with other monks, 13th-century illuminated manuscript

A more positive interpretation appears in the 13th-century Estoire del Saint Grail, the first book in the vast Arthurian cycle, the Lancelot-Grail. In describing the travels of Joseph of Arimathea, keeper of the Holy Grail, the author says that most residents of the Middle East were pagans until the coming of Muhammad, who is shown as a true prophet sent by God to bring Christianity to the region. This mission however failed when Muhammad's pride caused him to alter God's wishes, thereby deceiving his followers. Nevertheless, Muhammad's religion is portrayed as being greatly superior to paganism.

The Tultusceptru de libro domni Metobii, an Andalusian manuscript with unknown dating, recounts how Muhammad (called Ozim, from Hashim) was tricked by Satan into adulterating an originally pure divine revelation. The story argues God was concerned about the spiritual fate of the Arabs and wanted to correct their deviation from the faith. He then sends an angel to the monk Osius who orders him to preach to the Arabs.

Osius however is in ill-health and orders a young monk, Ozim, to carry out the angel's orders instead. Ozim sets out to follow his orders, but gets stopped by an evil angel on the way. The ignorant Ozim believes him to be the same angel that spoke to Osius before. The evil angel modifies and corrupts the original message given to Ozim by Osius, and renames Ozim Muhammad. From this followed the erroneous teachings of Islam, according to the Tultusceptru.

In Summa Contra Gentiles Thomas Aquinas wrote a critical view of Muhammad, suggesting that his teachings aligned closely with worldly desires and lacked strong support from earlier religious texts. Aquinas claimed that Muhammad's followers might have been discouraged from studying the Old and New Testaments, which he saw as incompatible with Muhammad's teachings.

==== Jewish Views ====
In the Middle Ages, it was common for Jewish writers to describe Muhammad as ha-Meshuggah ("The Madman"), a term of contempt frequently used in the Bible (Note: The term can be found in Jeremiah 29:26 and Hosea 9:7) for those who believe themselves to be prophets. However, not all Jewish views of Muhammad were negative. The 12th-century Yemenite rabbi Natan’el al-Fayyumi taught that God sends different prophets to other nations and regarded Muhammad as a true prophet for the Arabs, though not for Jews. Likewise, the apocalyptic Midrash The Secrets of Rabbi Simon ben Yohai portrays Muhammad as playing a positive role in redeeming Jews from Christian oppression and contributing a positive role to the messianic process.

=== Early modern period ===
Martin Luther referred to Muhammad as "a devil and first-born child of Satan." Luther's primary target of criticism at the time was the Pope, and Luther's characterization of Muhammad was intended to draw a comparison to show that the Pope was worse.

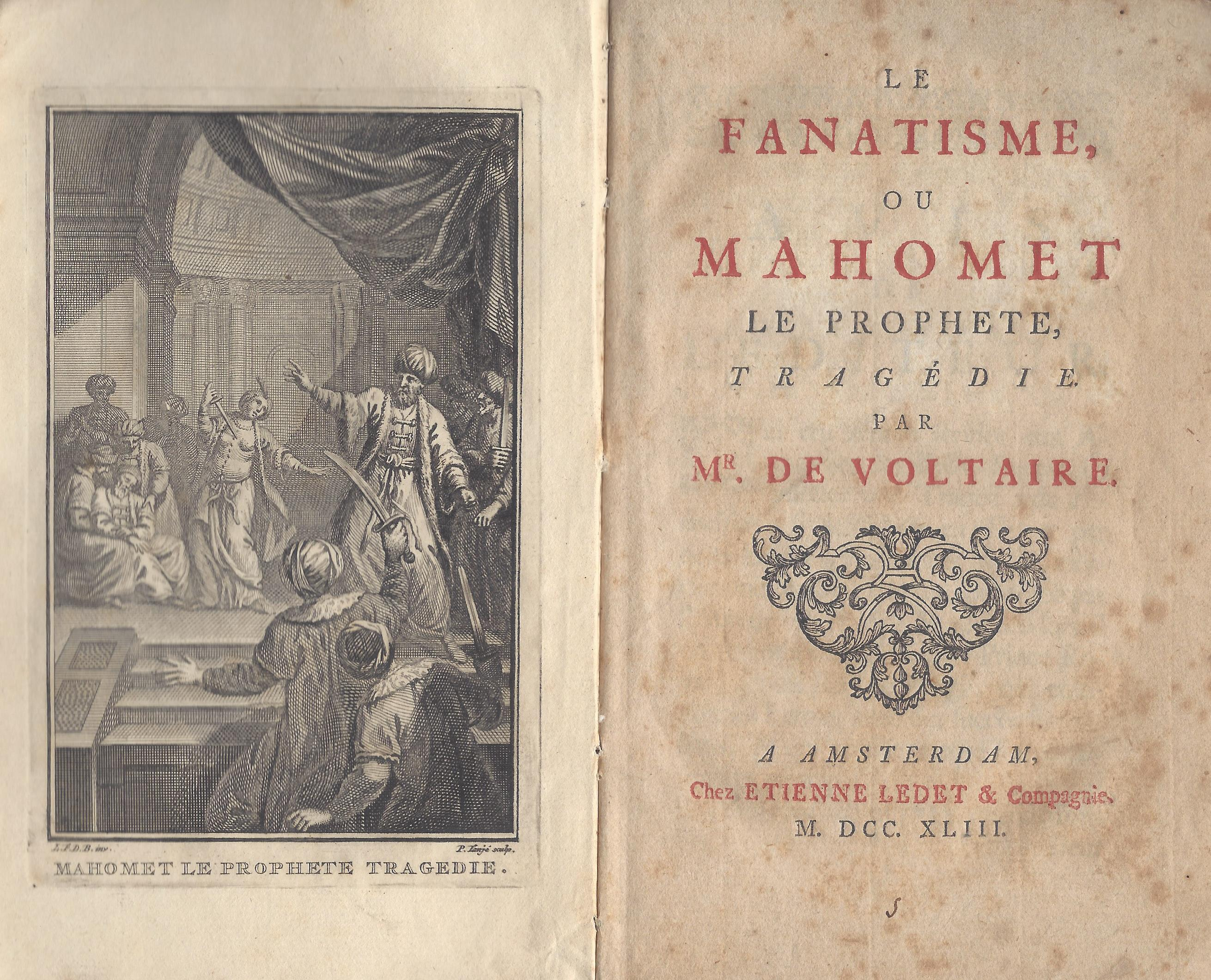
The frontispiece of the 1743 edition of Voltaire's play Mahomet

Mahomet (French: Le fanatisme, ou Mahomet le Prophète, literally "Fanaticism, or Mahomet the Prophet") is a five-act tragedy written in 1736 by French playwright and philosopher Voltaire. It made its debut performance in Lille on 25 April 1741. The play is a study of religious fanaticism, drawing from an episode in traditional biographies of Muhammad. Voltaire described the play as "written in opposition to the founder of a false and barbarous sect to whom could I with more propriety inscribe a satire on the cruelty and errors of a false prophet". However, some scholars posit that the play targeted "the intolerance of the Catholic Church and its crimes done on behalf of the Christ."

In a 1740 letter to Frederick II of Prussia, Voltaire criticized Muhammad's actions, attributing his influence to superstition and a lack of Enlightenment values, and described him as "a Tartuffe with a sword in his hand."

However, Voltaire later conceded that while Muhammad's means were shocking, his civil laws were good, and he effectively removed much of Asia from idolatry. Voltaire also referred to Muhammad as a "poet" and recognized him as a literate figure and drew parallels between Arabs and ancient Hebrews, noting their shared fervor for battle in the name of God.

According to Malise Ruthven, Voltaire's view became more positive as he learned more about Islam. As a result, his book Fanaticism (Mohammad the Prophet), inspired Goethe, who was attracted to Islam, to write a drama on this theme, though completed only the poem Mahomets-Gesang ("Mahomet's Singing"). (Note: August Wilhelm Schlegel considered Goethe "a heathen who converted to Islam.")

=== Late modern period ===
In the early 20th century Western scholarly views of Muhammad changed, including critical views. In the 1911 Catholic Encyclopedia Gabriel Oussani states that Muhammad was inspired by an "imperfect understanding" of Judaism and Christianity, but that the views of Luther and those who call Muhammad a "wicked impostor", a "dastardly liar" and a "willful deceiver" are an "indiscriminate abuse" and "unsupported by facts." Instead, 19th-century Western scholars such as Aloys Sprenger, Theodor Noldeke, Gustav Weil, William Muir, Sigismund Koelle, Grimme and D.S. Margoliouth "give us a more correct and unbiased estimate of Muhammad's life and character, and substantially agree as to his motives, prophetic call, personal qualifications, and sincerity."

Muir, Marcus Dods and others have suggested that Muhammad was at first sincere, but later became deceptive. Koelle finds "the key to the first period of Muhammad's life in Khadija, his first wife," after whose death he became prey to his "evil passions." Samuel Marinus Zwemer, a Christian missionary, criticised the life of Muhammad by the standards of the Old and New Testaments, by the pagan morality of his Arab compatriots, and last, by the new law which he brought. Quoting Johnstone, Zwemer concludes by claiming that his harsh judgment rests on evidence which "comes all from the lips and the pens of his [i.e. Muhammad's] own devoted adherents."

The Sair-e-Dozakh (1927), ("A walk through the Hell", an article critical of Islam published in a magazine called Risala-i-Vartman) was a take on the Isra and Mi'raj, Muhammad's journey to heaven and hell according to Islamic traditions. Described as a "brutal satire" by Gene Thursby, it described a dream purportedly experienced by the author in which he mounts a mysterious animal and sees various Hindu deities and Sikh gurus in the realm of salvation.

=== Contemporary history ===
Somali-Dutch feminist writer Ayaan Hirsi Ali has called him a "tyrant" and a "pervert". Neuroscientist and prominent ideological critic Sam Harris, contrasts Muhammad with Jesus Christ. While he regards Christ as something of a "hippie" figure, he describes Muhammad as a "conquering warlord" whose teachings promote spreading faith through subjugation.

American historian Daniel Pipes sees Muhammad as a politician, stating that "because Muhammad created a new community, the religion that was its raison d'être had to meet the political needs of its adherents."

In 2012, Nakoula Basseley Nakoula released a film titled Innocence of Muslims. A Vanity Fair article described the film as poorly made with disjointed dialogue, erratic editing, and melodramatic performances. The film was intended to provoke, depicting Muhammad in a highly negative light, portraying him as a violent and immoral figure. Reactions to the film's release led to intense demonstrations and targeted actions against Western institutions across various countries in the Muslim world.

== See also ==
- Censorship in Islamic societies
- Criticism of the Quran
- Criticism of Islam
- Depictions of Muhammad
- Historicity of Muhammad
- Islam and other religions
- Hindu–Islamic relations
- Muhammad and Joseph Smith
- Islam and war
- Sex segregation in Islam
