= De laude Pampilone epistola =

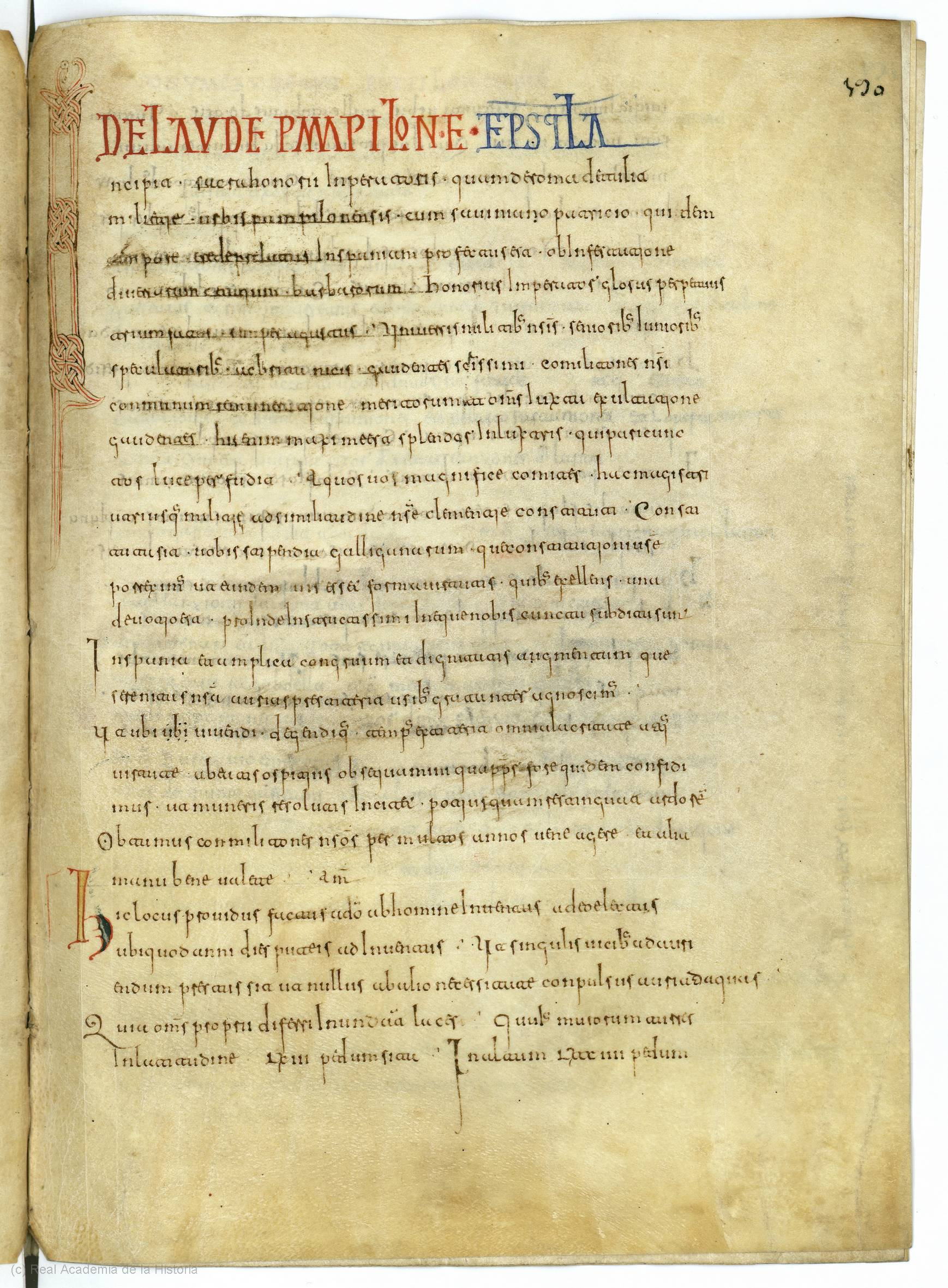
De laude Pampilone from the Codex of Roda.

De laude Pampilone epistola ("Letter in Praise of Pamplona") is a composite text preserved in the Roda Codex from 10th-century Navarre. It comprises two unrelated texts, which the anonymous scribe of the manuscript either considered to be one or else found united in his source. The conventional title of the work is owed to this scribe.

== Contents ==
=== Letter from Honorius ===
The first part of the work is an actual letter of the emperor Honorius to the militia of Pamplona, probably dating to the 410s. The body of the letter is an official communiqué to the troops of the diocese of Hispania. Only the introductory formula is specific to those of Pamplona, and militias in the rest of Hispania would have received identical letters with personalised introductions. The Pamplonan one is a unique survival from an obscure place and period. It was delivered by a certain patrician named Sabinianus, who was being appointed magister utriusque militae ("master of both forces", i.e. cavalry and infantry) for Hispania by the emperor. It was likely kept at Pamplona until it or a copy of it was copied into the Códice de Roda. This was probably in the late tenth century at the royal court of Navarre in Nájera.

The text of the letter is obscure and possibly garbled in transmission. It provides no details of the militia of Pamplona. The only indication of conditions obtaining in the region is a reference to "the infestation of barbarians", perhaps alluding to the invasion of the Alans, Suevi and Vandals, who crossed the Pyrenees in 409.

The text of the letter has been published at least six times. The editio princeps (first edition) was published in 1945 by José María Lacarra. There followed three editions with heavy emendations before 1970. A facsimile of the manuscript and an accompanying transcription with English translation was published in 1985. An unedited transcription of the text was published by Michael Kulikowski in 1998.

=== Description of Pamplona ===
The second part of the work is a brief laudatio (praise text) describing the city of Pamplona. It was probably composed in the seventh century, when the Visigoths ruled most of Hispania, but Pamplona itself may have been held by the Franks. The anonymous author of the laudatio is representative of "urban continuity" in the post-Roman period. His description indicates how much Pamplona had been affected by the late Roman urban fortification programme. Its walls were 84 feet high and studded with 67 towers. Spritiually, the city was defended by the bones of unspecified martyrs. Its chief enemies were the rural and pagan Vascones (called Vaccaei, a classicism) outside the city—a military threat—and the heretics, probably Arians, within. The notion of patron saints providing protection was already commonplace throughout the Mediterranean world in the seventh century.

The term Vaccaei may indicate a subset of the Vascones (Basques), but more probably is just a synonym. It demonstrates that the urban population of the region had ceased to identify with the rural.

== See also ==
- List of literary descriptions of cities (before 1550)

== Sources ==
- Collins, Roger (1986). The Basques. Oxford: Basil Blackwell.
- Kulikowski, Michael (1998). "The 'Epistula Honorii', Again". Zeitschrift für Papyrologie und Epigraphik. 122: 247–52.
- Lacarra de Miguel, José María [in Spanish] (1945). "Textos navarros del Códice de Roda". Estudios de Edad Media de la Corona de Aragón. 1: 194–283.
- Larrañaga Elorza, Koldo (1994). "Glosa sobre un viejo texto referido a la historia de Pamplona: el 'De laude Pampilone'". Príncipe de Viana. 5 (201): 137–48.
- Mezquíriz de Catalán, María Ángeles (1973). Pamplona Romana. Pamplona.
- Sivan, Hagith S. (1985). "An Unedited Letter of the Emperor Honorius to the Spanish Soldiers". Zeitschrift für Papyrologie und Epigraphik. 61: 273–87.

== Editions ==
- Balil, Alberto (1970). "La defensa de Hispania en el Bajo Imperio: amenaza exterior y inquietud interna". Legio VII Gemina. León. pp. 601–20.
- Demougeot, Émilienne (1956). "Une lettre de l'empereur Honorius sur l'hospitium des soldats". Nouvelle revue historique de droit français et étranger. 4th. 34: 25–49.
- Jones, A. H. M. (1957). "A Letter of Honorius to the Army of Spain". X^{e} Congrès international des études byzantines, Istambul 1955. Istanbul. p. 223.
