= Annales martyrum =

Medieval Iberian annals

The Annales martyrum is a medieval Iberian annalistic composition that compiles a series of records in chronological order, mostly related to Christian martyrs.

Two medieval versions of this text are known. The first was copied onto a folio added to the so-called Códice de Azagra in the 10th century and was probably written in the Monastery of Cardeña. The second is found in the Códice de Roda, a manuscript produced in La Rioja at the end of the 10th century. In this version, the annalistic series is preceded by a list of ten Roman emperors who persecuted the Christians, titled Nomina imperatorum qui christianis persequuti sunt.
