= Codex Vigilanus =

Chronicle from 9th century

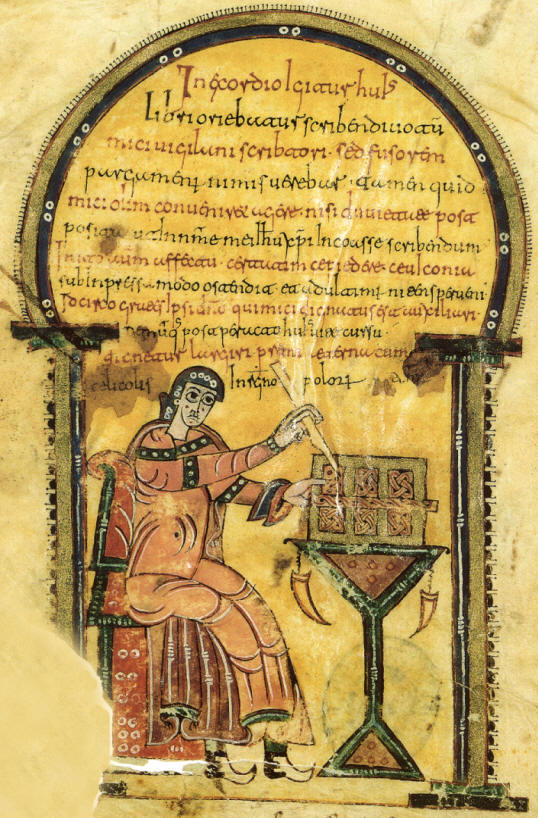
Image of the scribe Vigila from Codex Vigilanus

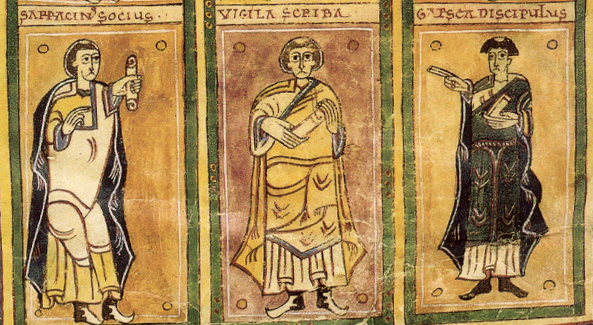
The scribes: Serracino, Vigila, and García as drawn by Vigila.

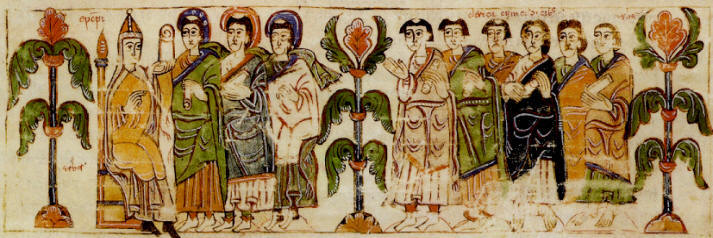
People from Toledo.

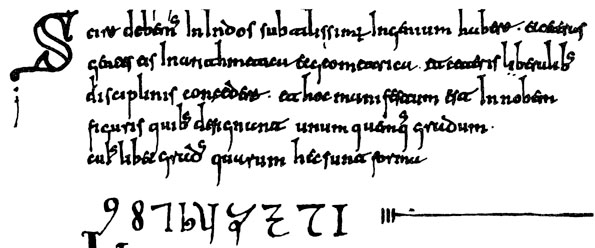
Earliest mention and representation of Hindu-Arabic numerals in the West, 9 through 1, which doesn't include 0

The Codex Vigilanus or Codex Albeldensis (Spanish: Códice Vigilano or Albeldense) is an illuminated compilation of various historical documents accounting for a period extending from antiquity to the 10th century in Hispania. Among the many texts brought together by the compilers are the canons of the Visigothic Councils of Toledo, the Liber Iudiciorum, the decrees of some early popes and other patristic writings, historical narratives (such as the Crónica Albeldense and the Life of Mohammed), various other pieces of civil and canon law, and a calendar. It is now in the library of El Escorial monastery, with the shelfmark D.I.2.

The compilers were three monks of the Riojan monastery of San Martín de Albelda: Vigila, after whom it was named, was not only the illustrator but also the principal organizer of the entire codex; Serracino, his friend; and García, his disciple. Catherine Brown argues that the compilers of Codex Vigilanus viewed their work as more than a simple compilation of texts and images, instead treating bookmaking as a process of weaving that brought together historical and legal texts, and images into a coherent composition. The first compilation was finished in 881, but was updated up to 976. The original manuscript is preserved in the library of El Escorial (as Escorialensis d I 2). At the time of its compilation, Albelda was the cultural and intellectual centre of the Kingdom of Pamplona. The manuscripts celebrate with illustrations not only the ancient Gothic kings who had reformed the law — Chindasuinth, Reccesuinth, and Ergica — but also its contemporary dedicatees, the rulers of Navarre: Sancho II of Pamplona and his queen, Urraca, and his brother Ramiro Garcés, King of Viguera.

The codex contains, among other material, the earliest mention and representation of Hindu-Arabic numerals in the West. The numerals shown include only 9 through 1 and omit zero. Although the Iberian Peninsula was conquered by Umayyad Caliphate in the early 8th century, the exact year when Hindu-Arabic numerals reached Al-Andalus remains uncertain. However, they were known in Iberian Peninsula by the late 10th century, which is when the numerals were recorded in the Codex Vigilanus.

The illuminations are stylistically unique, combining Visigothic, Mozarabic, and Carolingian elements. The interlace patterns and the drapery show Carolingian, as well Italo-Byzantine, influence. The use of animals as decoration and for supporting columns also parallels contemporary Frankish usage. More Carolingian and less Byzantine influence is evident in the Codex Aemilianensis, a copy of the Vigilanus made at San Millán de la Cogolla in 992 by a different illustrator.

== Sources ==
- Brown, Catherine. "The Weavers of Albelda." In Remember the Hand: Manuscription in Early Medieval Iberia. New York: Fordham University Press, 2023, pp. 185–205
- Guilmain, Jacques. "Interlace Decoration and the Influence of the North on Mozarabic Illumination (in Notes)." The Art Bulletin, Vol. 42, No. 3. (September, 1960), pp 211–218.
- Guilmain, Jacques. "Zoomorphic Decoration and the Problem of the Sources of Mozarabic Illumination." Speculum, Vol. 35, No. 1. (January, 1960), pp 17–38.
- Guilmain, Jacques. "The Forgotten Early Medieval Artist." Art Journal, Vol. 25, No. 1. (Autumn, 1965), pp 33–42.
- Bishko, Charles Julian. "Salvus of Albelda and Frontier Monasticism in Tenth-Century Navarre." Speculum, Vol. 23, No. 4. (October, 1948), pp 559–590.
