= Chronica Prophetica =

The Chronica Prophetica (transl. Prophetic Chronicle) is an anonymous medieval Latin chronicle written by a Christian in April 883 at or near the court of Alfonso III of Asturias in Oviedo. It uses the dating system of the Spanish Era and is essentially an interpretation of the prophecy concerning the fate of Gog found in the biblical Book of Ezekiel. To the anonymous Asturian, the destruction of the Emirate of Córdoba is closely linked with the end times. According to Kenneth Baxter Wolf in the introduction to his translation, "The fact that Asturian armies at the time were taking advantage" of the weakness of the Umayyad emirate of Córdoba and "raiding deep into Muslim territory accounts for the overly optimistic estimates of the imminent Christian domination of the peninsula" in the Chronica Prophetica.

The Chronica is divided into six sections:

- Dicta Execielis profete, quod invenimus in libro pariticino (Sayings of Ezekiel the prophet, which we find in the Libro pariticino)
  - It is here that the author gives his interpretation of Ezekiel and also dates himself to "era 921, the seventeenth year of Alfonso's rule in Oviedo". Gog is identified with the Goths, who will be defeated by "Ishmael", identified with the Muslims, in his own land before defeating them in Libya after 170 years of oppression (which the author believes elapses on 11 November 883). The libro pariticino is probably to be identified with the Chronicon Ovetense.
- Genealogia Sarracenorum (Genealogy of the Saracens)
  - This is a genealogy of the contemporary emir of Córdoba, Muhammad I, from Abraham and Hagar. The author mistakenly believes the Arabs claim descent from Sarah.
- Storia de Mameth (History of Muhammad)
  - This is one of the earliest Latin lives of Muhammad. Three other versions that were then circulating have survived, and one other is known to have been kept in the library of the monastery at Leyre in Navarre in 850. The clear intention of the author of this tract, written for a Christian audience, was to denigrate Islam's founder as a false prophet and a wicked man. Probably it was included in the Chronica to add justification to the war against Córdoba.
- Ratio Sarracenorum de sua ingressione in Spania (Reason for the incursion of the Saracens into Spain)
  - The author dates Roderic's defeat at the Battle of Guadalete to "the Ides of November in the year 752 era", that is, 11 November 714. He also identified two invasions, the first by Abu Zubra and the second, a year later, by Tarik; probably he has divided the historical figure Ṭāriq ibn Ziyad into two persons. He blames the Goths' defeat on their lack of penance for their sins: "The city of Toledo, victor of all peoples, succumbed as a victim to the triumphant Ishmaelites, and deserved to be subjected to them. Thus Spain was ruined for its disgusting sins, in the 380th year of the Goths."
- De Goti, qui remanserint civitates Ispaniensis (Of the Goths, who remained in the cities of the Spaniards)
  - Here the author explains how the Goths, after Roderic's defeat, remained at war with the Saracens for seven years before concluding a pact with them whereby their fortifications were dismantled and they became "servants of arms" (servi armis). He then lists the rulers of Muslim Spain. Finally, he predicts its demise. He also mentions briefly two Viking raids: the "Lothomani" (Northmen) attacked the Kalends of August era 880 (AD 842) and again in July 858 (era 896), when "there was killing in Lisbon".
- Reges que regnaberunt in Spania ex origine Ismaelitarum Beniumele (Kings who reigned in Spain from the beginning of the Umayyad Ishmaelites)
  - This is a regnal list of the kings of Asturias beginning with Pelagius.

== Translations ==
- Wolf, Kenneth Baxter (ed.). 2008. Chronica Prophetica. Medieval Texts in Translation.
