= List of Muslim historians =

The following is a list of Muslim historians writing in the Islamic historiographical tradition, which developed from hadith literature in the time of the first caliphs.

== Chronological list ==
=== Historians of the Formative Period ===
==== The First Century BH 50 to AH 50 / CE 570–618 ====
The Companions of the Prophet and the early Tabi'in (first generation) who left written works (some no longer extant, but are cited verbatim elsewhere.)

- Suhar Al-Abdi 25 BH (594 CE) - 60 AH (679/680 CE)
- Abd Allah ibn Amr ibn al-As 27 BH (595 CE) - 65 AH (684/685 CE) - Al-Sahifah al-Sadiqah
- Urwah ibn Zubayr 23 AH (643/644 CE) - 94 AH (712/713 CE)
- Sa'id ibn Jubayr 23 AH (643/644 CE) - 95 AH (713/714 CE)
- Mujahid ibn Jabr 21 AH (641/642 CE) - 104 AH (722/723 CE)
- Aban bin Uthman bin Affan 20 AH (640/641 CE) - 105 AH (723/724 CE)
- Wahb ibn Munabbih 34 AH (654/655 CE) - 114 AH (732/733 CE)
- Ibn Shihab al-Zuhri 49 AH (669/670 CE) - 124 AH (741/742 CE)

==== The First Century - AH 50 to AH100 / CE 618–718 ====
Latter Tabi'in and early Tabi' al-Tabi'in

- Musa ibn ʿUqba 55 AH (674/675 CE) - 141 AH (758/759 CE)
- Hisham ibn Urwah 61 AH (680/681 CE) - 146 AH (763/764 CE)
- Muhammad ibn as-Sā'ib al-Kalbī 55 AH (674/675 CE) - 146 AH (763/764 CE)
- Awana ibn al-Hakam d. 147 AH (764/765 CE)
- Ibn Ishaq 80 AH (699/700 CE) - 151 AH (768/769 CE) Sirah Rasul Allah (The Life of the Apostle of God)
- Al-Sharqi bin Al-Qatmi 80 AH (699/700 CE) - 155 AH (771/772 CE)
- Abu Ma'shar al-Sindi al-Madani 80 AH (699/700 CE) - 170 AH (786/787 CE)
- Abi Mikhnaf d. 170 AH (786/787 CE) Maqtal al-Husayn
- Isa ibn Yazid ibn Da'b al-Laythi d. 171 AH (787/788 CE)
- Ibn Lahi'a 96 AH (714/715 CE) - 174 AH (790/791 CE)
- Malik ibn Anas 93 AH (711/712 CE) - 179 AH (795/796 CE) - Founder of the Maliki Madhab
- Sayf ibn Umar 90 AH (708/709 CE) - 180 AH (796/797 CE)

=== Historians of the Classical Period ===
==== The Second Century AH 100-200 / CE 718–815 ====
Latter Tabi' al-Tabi'in Historians - Era contemporaneous with Umayyad decline and Abbasid Rise.

- Abu Ismail al-Azdi 110 AH (728/729 CE) - 170 AH (786/787 CE)
- Abu Ishaq al-Fazari d. 188 AH (803/804 CE)
- Ibn Zabala d. 199 AH (814/815 CE)
- Hisham ibn al-Kalbi 110 AH (728/729 CE) - 204 AH (819/820 CE)
- Al-Waqidi 130 AH (747/748 CE) - 207 AH (822/823 CE) Kitab al-Tarikh wa'l-Maghazi (Book of History and Battles).
- Al-Haytham ibn 'Adi d. 207 AH (822/823 CE)
- Abd al-Razzaq al-San'ani 126 AH (743/744 CE) - 211 AH (826/827 CE)
- Nasr ibn Muzahim 130 AH (747/748 CE) - 212 AH (827/828 CE)
- Al-Asmaʿi 123 AH (740/741 CE) - 216 AH (831/832 CE)
- Ibn Hisham d. 218 AH (833/834 CE)
- Ibn Bakkar 129 AH (746/747 CE) - 222 AH (836/837 CE)
- Ibn Sa'd 168 AH (784/785 CE) - 230 AH (844/845 CE)
- Muhammad bin Aa'idh Al-Qurayshi 150 AH (767/768 CE) - 233 AH (847/848 CE)
- Muṣʻab ibn ʻAbd Allāh Zubayrī 156 AH (772/773 CE) - 236 AH (850/851 CE)
- Wathima ibn Musa d. 237 AH (851/852 CE)
- Khalifa ibn Khayyat 160 AH (776/777 CE) - 240 AH (854/855 CE)
- Ali ibn al-Madini 161 AH (777/778 CE) - 234 AH (848/849 CE)
- Al-Abbas bin Hisham Al-Kalbi 165 AH (781/782 CE) - 240 AH (854/855 CE)
- Muhammad ibn Habib al-Baghdadi d. 245 AH (859/860 CE)
- Al-Jahiz 159 AH (775/776 CE) - 255 AH (868/869 CE)
- Ibn Habib 180 AH (796/797 CE) - 238 AH (852/853 CE)
- Muhammad al-Bukhari 194 AH (809/810 CE) - 256 AH (869/870 CE) Sahih al-Bukhari, The Great History
- Al-Zubayr ibn Bakkār 172 AH (788/789 CE) - 256 AH (869/870 CE)
- Ibn Abd al-Hakam 187 AH (802/803 CE) - 257 AH (870/871 CE) Futuh Misr wa'l-Maghrib wa akhbaruha

==== The Third Century AH 200-300 / CE 815–913 ====
- Omar ibn Shabba d. 262 AH (875/876 CE)
- Ibn Majah 209 AH (824/825 CE) - 273 AH (886/887 CE)
- Abu Dawud 202 AH (817/818 CE) - 275 AH (888/889 CE)
- Ibn Qutaybah 213 AH (828/829 CE) - 276 AH (889/890 CE) Uyun al-akhbar, Al-Imama wa al-Siyasa
- Al-Baladhuri 204 AH (819/820 CE) - 279 AH (892/893 CE)
- Al-Dinawari 212 AH (827/828 CE) - 282 AH (895/896 CE) Akbar al-tiwal
- Ibrahim Al-Thaqafi d. 283 AH (896/897 CE)
- al-Tirmidhi 209 AH (824/825 CE) - 279 AH (892/893 CE)
- Al-Fakihi 215 AH (830/831 CE) - 279 AH (892/893 CE)
- Umara ibn Wathima d. 289 AH (901/902 CE)
- Aslam ibn Sahl ibn Aslam d. 292 AH (904/905 CE)
- Ya'qubi d. 284 AH (897/898 CE) or 298 AH (910/911 CE) Tarikh al-Yaqubi
- Al-Nasa'i 214 AH (829/830 CE) - 303 AH (915/916 CE)
- Ibn Fadlan d. after 309 AH (921/922 CE)
- Muhammad ibn Jarir al-Tabari 224 AH (838/839 CE) - 310 AH (922/923 CE) History of the Prophets and Kings
- Ibn A'tham d. 314 AH (926/927 CE) al-Futuh
- Ibn Wahshiyya d. 318 AH (930/931 CE)
- Abu Ahmed Al-Jaloudi d. 332 AH (943/944 CE)
- Abu al-Arab al-Tamimi 251 AH (865/866 CE) - 333 AH (944/945 CE)
- Sinan ibn Thabit d. 331 AH (942/943 CE)
- Abū Muhammad al-Hasan al-Hamdānī 280 AH (893/894 CE) - 336 AH (947/948 CE)
- Abu Bakr bin Yahya al-Suli d. 336 AH (947/948 CE)
- Abu Saeed ibn al-A'rabi 245 AH (859/860 CE) - 340 AH (951/952 CE)
- Ali al-Masudi 283 AH (896/897 CE) - 346 AH (957/958 CE) The Meadows of Gold
- Muhammad ibn Yusuf al-Kindi 283 AH (896/897 CE) - 350 AH (961/962 CE)
- Ibn Shaban al-Amari 270 AH (883/884 CE) - 355 AH (965/966 CE)
- Abu al-Faraj al-Isfahani 284 AH (897/898 CE) - 356 AH (966/967 CE)

==== The Fourth Century AH 300-400 / CE 913–1010 ====
- Al-Mutahhar ibn Tahir al-Maqdisi d. 355 AH (965/966 CE)
- Qadi al-Nu'man - (Fatimid) d. 363 AH (973/974 CE)
- Ibn al-Qūṭiyya (Anadalusian) d. 367 AH (977/978 CE) Ta'rikh iftitah al-Andalus
- Abu Suleiman Al-Rubii d. 379 AH (989/990 CE)
- al-Saghani d. 379 AH (989/990 CE) one of the earliest historians of science
- Al-Muqaddasi 336 AH (947/948 CE) - 380 AH (990/991 CE) - Aḥsan al-taqāsīm has a detailed description on his birthplace in Palestine and the Levant
- Ibn an-Nadīm 320 AH (932/933 CE) - 385 AH (995/996 CE)
- al-Daraqutni 306 AH (918/919 CE) - 385 AH (995/996 CE)
- Ibn Faradi (Anadalusian) 351 AH (962/963 CE) - 403 AH (1012/1013 CE)
- al-Musabbihi (Fatimid) 366 AH (976/977 CE) - 420 AH (1029/1030 CE), Akhbar Misr
- Ibn Miskawayh 320 AH (932/933 CE) - 421 AH (1030/1031 CE)
- Muhammad ibn Abd al-Jabbar al-Utbi d. 427 AH (1035/1036 CE)
- al-Bīrūnī 362 AH (972/973 CE) - 440 AH (1048/1049 CE) Kitab fi Tahqiq ma li'l-Hind (Researches on India), The Remaining Signs of Past Centuries
- Hilal ibn al-Muhassin al-Sabi' 359 AH (969/970 CE) - 448 AH (1056/1057 CE)
- al-Khatib al-Baghdadi 392 AH (1001/1002 CE) - 463 AH (1070/1071 CE) Tarikh Baghdad (a biographical dictionary of major Baghdadi figures)
- Abolfazl Beyhaqi d. 470 AH (1077/1078 CE) Tarikh-e Mas'oudi (also known as Tarikh-e Beyhaqi).

===== Historians by Region =====
====== Arabian Peninsula, Mesopotamia and Persia ======
- Abu'l-Faraj ibn al-Jawzi (d. 1201)
- Yaqut al-Hamawi (1179–1229) author of Mu'jam al-Buldan ("The Dictionary of Countries")
- Ibn al-Athir (1160–1231) al-Kamil fi'l-Tarikh
- Muhammad bin Ali Rawandi (c.1204) Rahat al-sudur, (a history of the Great Seljuq Empire and its break-up into minor beys)
- Zahiroddin Nasr Mohammad Aufi (d. 1242)
- Sibt ibn al-Jawzi (d. 1256)
- Hamdollah Mostowfi (d. 1281)
- Ibn Bibi (d. after 1281)
- Ata-Malik Juvayni (1283)
- Ibn al-Tiqtaqa (d. after 1302)
- Ibn al-Fuwati (d. 1323)
- Wassaf (d. 1323)
- Rashid-al-Din Hamadani (d. 1398) Jami al-Tawarikh
- Sharaf ad-Din Ali Yazdi (d. 1454)
- Mirkhond (d. 1498) Rauzât-us-safâ

====== Egypt, Palestine and Syria ======
- Ẓāhir al-Dīn Nīshāpūrī around 1175
- Ibn al-Qalanisi (d. 1160)
- Ibn Asakir (d. 1176)
- Usamah ibn Munqidh (d. 1188)
- Imad al-Din al-Isfahani (d. 1201)
- Ibrahim ibn Wasif Shah (d. 1202)
- Abd al-Latif al-Baghdadi (d. 1231)
- Baha al-Din ibn Shaddad (d. 1235) al-Nawādir al-Sultaniyya wa'l-Maḥāsin al-Yūsufiyya (The Rare and Excellent History of Saladin)
- Sibt ibn al-Jawzi (d. 1256) Mir'at al-zaman (Mirror of the Time)
- Ibn al-Adim (d. 1262)
- Abu Shama (AH 599–665/CE 1203–68) full name Abū Shāma Shihāb al-Dīn al-Maqdisī
- Ibn Khallikan (d. 1282)
- Ibn Abd al-Zahir (d. 1293)
- Abu'l-Fida (d. 1331)
- al-Nuwayri (d. 1332)
- al-Mizzi (d. 1341)
- al-Dhahabi (d. 1348) Tarikh al-Islam al-kabir
- Ibn Kathir (d. 1373) al-Bidaya wa'l-Nihaya (The Beginning and the End)
- Ibn al-Furat (d. 1405)
- al-Maqrizi (d. 1442) al-Suluk li-ma'firat duwwal al-muluk (Mamluk history of Egypt)
- Ibn Hajr al-Asqalani (d. 1449)
- al-Ayni (d. 1451)
- Ibn Taghribirdi (d. 1470) Nujum al-zahira fi muluk Misr wa'l-Qahira (History of Egypt)
- al-Sakhawi (d. 1497)
- al-Suyuti (d. 1505) History of the Caliphs
- Mujir al-Din al-'Ulaymi (d.1522)

====== al-Andalus and the Maghreb ======
- Ibn Hazm (d. 1063)
- Yusuf ibn abd al-Barr (d. 1071)
- Ibn Hayyan (d. 1075)
- al-Udri (d. 1085)
- Abū 'Ubayd 'Abd Allāh al-Bakrī (d. 1094)
- Qadi Iyad (d. 1149)
- Mohammed al-Baydhaq (d. 1164)
- Ibn Rushd (d. 1198)
- Abdelwahid al-Marrakushi
- al-Qurtubi (d. 1273)
- Abdelaziz al-Malzuzi (d. 1298)
- Ibn Idhari (d. 1312)
- Ibn Battuta (d. 1369))
- Ibn al-Khatib (d. 1374)
- Ibn Abi Zar (d. ca. 1320) Rawd al-Qirtas
- Ismail ibn al-Ahmar (d. 1406)
- Ibn Khaldun (d. 1406) al-Muqaddimah and al-I'bar

====== India ======
- Minhaj-i-Siraj (d. after 1260)
- Amir Khusro (d. 1325)
- Ziauddin Barani (d. 1357)
- Akbar Shah Khan Najibabadi (1875–1938)
- Hakim Syed Zillur Rahman Medieval Indian medical historian
- Sayyid Shamsullah Qadri (24 November 1885 – 22 October 1953)
- Muhammad Asadullah Al-Ghalib (15 January 1948)

=== Early modern historians ===
==== Turkish: Ottoman Empire ====
- Aşıkpaşazade (d. 1481)
- Tursun Beg (d. after 1488)
- İdris-i Bitlisi (d. 1520)
- Ibn Kemal (d. 1534)
- Matrakçı Nasuh (d. 1564)
- Hoca Sadeddin Efendi (d. 1599)
- Mustafa Âlî (d. 1600)
- Mustafa Selaniki (d. 1600)
- Katip Çelebi (d. 1647)
- İbrahim Peçevi (d. 1650)
- Evliya Çelebi (d. after 1682)
- Mustafa Naima (1655–1716) Ta'rīkh-i Na'īmā
- Silahdar Findiklili Mehmed Aga (d. 1723)
- Ahmed Resmî Efendi (d. 1783)
- Ahmet Cevdet Pasha (d. 1895)

==== Arabic: Ottoman Empire and Morocco ====
- Ibn Iyas (d. after November 1522)
- Ahmed Mohammed al-Maqqari (d. 1632)
- Mohammed al-Ifrani (d. 1747)
- Mohammed al-Qadiri (d. 1773)
- Khalil al-Muradi (d. 1791)
- Abd al-Rahman al-Jabarti (d. 1825) Aja'ib al-athar fi'l-tarajim wa'l-akhbar
- Ahmad ibn Khalid al-Nasiri (d. 1897)

==== Persian: Safavid Empire and Mughal India ====
- Muhammad Khwandamir (d. 1534)
- Abu'l-Fazl ibn Mubarak (d. 1602) Akbarnama
- Abd al-Qadir Bada'uni (d. 1615)
- Firishta (d. 1620)
- Iskandar Beg Munshi (d. 1632)
- Nizamuddin Ahmad (d. 1621)
- Inayat Allah Kamboh (d. 1671)
- Muhammad Saleh Kamboh (d. c. 1675)
- Abul Fazl Mamuri (c. 1700)
- Mirza Mehdi Khan Astarabadi (d. c. 1760)

=== Historians of the modern period ===
- Mohammad Iqbal (b. 1877)
- Joel Hayward (b. 1964)
- Tamim Ansary
- Seyyed Hossein Nasr
- Zaynulla Rasulev
- Abdurauf Fitrat
- Farid Esack
- Leila Ahmed
- Aysha Hidayatullah
- Ibrahim Abu-Lughod
- Lila Abu-Lughod
- Rashid Khalidi
- Carole Hillenbrand
- Laleh Bakhtiar
- Ingrid Mattson

== See also ==
- List of historians
- Lists of Islamic scholars
- Ulama – Muslim legal scholars
