= Dismissal and death of Khalid ibn al-Walid =

Dismissal of Khalid ibn al-Walid by Umar and his subsequent death

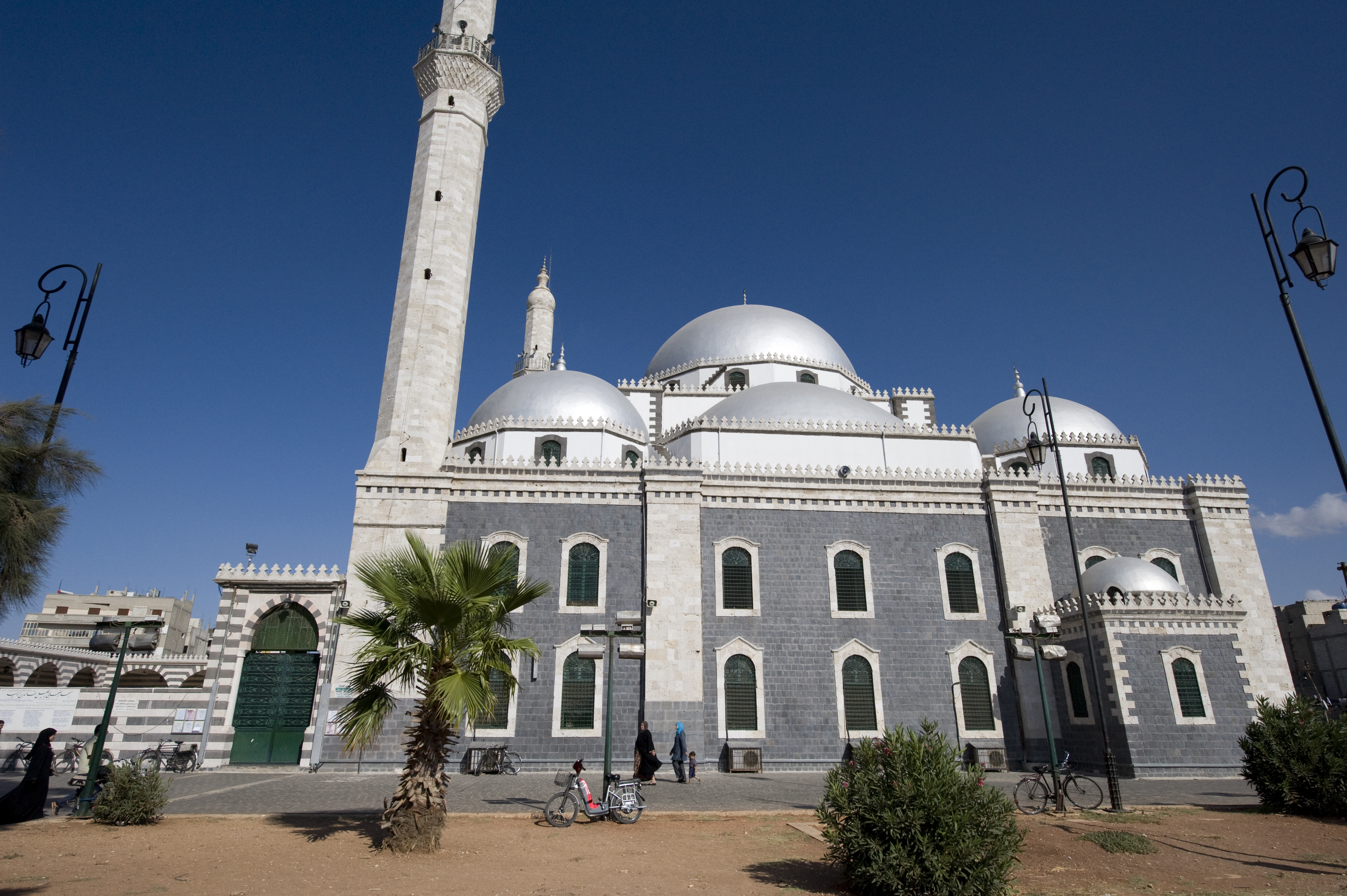
- Khalid’s tomb is claimed to be situated within the Khalid ibn al-Walid Mosque in Homs, Syria
- Date: Dismissal: c. 17 AH (638 CE); Death: 21 AH (642 CE)
- Location: Dismissal: Syria Death: Disputed (Homs or Medina)

The dismissal and death of Khalid ibn al-Walid refer to the removal of the prominent Muslim commander Khalid ibn al-Walid from the army by Caliph Umar ibn al-Khattab around 17 AH (638 CE) and his death in 21 AH (642 CE). Known as one of the companions of Muhammad and for his victories in the Ridda Wars and the early Muslim conquests of the Levant and Iraq, Khalid was dismissed, according to most historians, due to concerns about his handling of war spoils and fears that the Muslim community might rely too heavily on his leadership rather than on Allah. His death, reportedly caused by illness, was mourned by Umar and women of the Banu Makhzum. The location of his death remains disputed among historians, with some placing it in Homs and others in Medina.

By the time of Khalid's death, the Rashidun Caliphate under Umar had started to move from rapid expansion toward consolidating its control. This period saw a greater focus on siege warfare, organized governance, and formal military structures. Historians generally regarded Khalid as one of the most capable and successful generals in Islamic history. His military record has been compared to that of some of history's greatest commanders, such as Alexander the Great, with his use of rapid maneuvers, surprise attacks, and strategic mobility often leading to victory despite limited resources. His role in the early expansion of Islam has made him as notable figure and a symbol of heroism in Arab and Islamic history.

== Dismissal ==
Khalid was dismissed from his military command in 17 AH (638 CE) by Umar. Historians such as Ibn Asakir and Ibn Kathir, as well as reports preserved in the works of Aḥmad ibn Ḥanbal, attribute this decision primarily to differences in financial administration, particularly regarding Khalid's handling of war spoils. Reports from late 638 CE indicate that Khalid had allocated portions of the spoils from his campaigns in Syria, including a share for Al-Ash'ath ibn Qays. This distribution raised concerns in Medina, prompting Umar to order Abu Ubayda ibn al-Jarrah to investigate the matter publicly. Although the interrogation found no wrongdoing on Khalid's part, Umar had already decided to dismiss him regardless of the outcome. Following the interrogation in Homs, Khalid addressed his troops in Qinnasrin and Homs to bid them farewell before being summoned to Medina. During a council meeting in Jabiya that same year, Umar apologized and clarified his decision, stating that while Khalid had been instructed to distribute wealth among the less privileged Muhajirun, he instead allocated it to the strong, the noble, and the eloquent. This decision to dismiss Khalid faced opposition from Khalid's cousin, Abu Amr ibn Hafs ibn al-Mughirah, who alleged that Umar's actions stemmed from envy and overlooked Khalid's military authority as granted by Muhammad. Umar firmly rejected the accusation. According to Ibn Kathir, Khalid's dismissal was primarily due to his lenient approach to distributing wealth during military campaigns.

Beyond financial matters, another critical reason for Umar's decision was his concern that Muslims had grown overly dependent on Khalid's military successes, potentially attributing victories to him rather than on Allah. To clarify his intentions, Umar later addressed the provinces with the following statement:

I did not remove Khalid out of anger or suspicion of betrayal, but because people had become too enamored with him. I feared they would rely entirely on him and be tested through him. I wanted them to know that Allah is the true doer of all things and to prevent them from falling into temptation.

This concern became evident during Abu Ubayda's siege in the Levant, where his forces initially struggled without Khalid. Later, when Hudhayfah ibn al-Yaman brought news of victory, Umar expressed gratitude to Allah but also anticipated that some would regret Khalid's absence. This perspective was further underscored during Khalid's dismissal, when Umar recited a verse to him, acknowledging his achievements while reminding him that all matters are governed by Allah.

Despite Khalid's dismissal, Umar continued to hold him in high esteem, which contrasts with the interpretation of some modern scholars such as De Goeje, William Muir, and Andreas Stratos, who argue that the decision was motivated by personal resentment. According to early sources including al-Tabari and Ibn Asakir, Umar reassured Khalid of his respect and affection, stating that he remained dear to him and would have no reason for complaint in the future. Some historical sources report that following his dismissal, Khalid spent his remaining years in Homs, living with his family, rarely leaving the city, and remaining devoted to Islam.

== Death ==
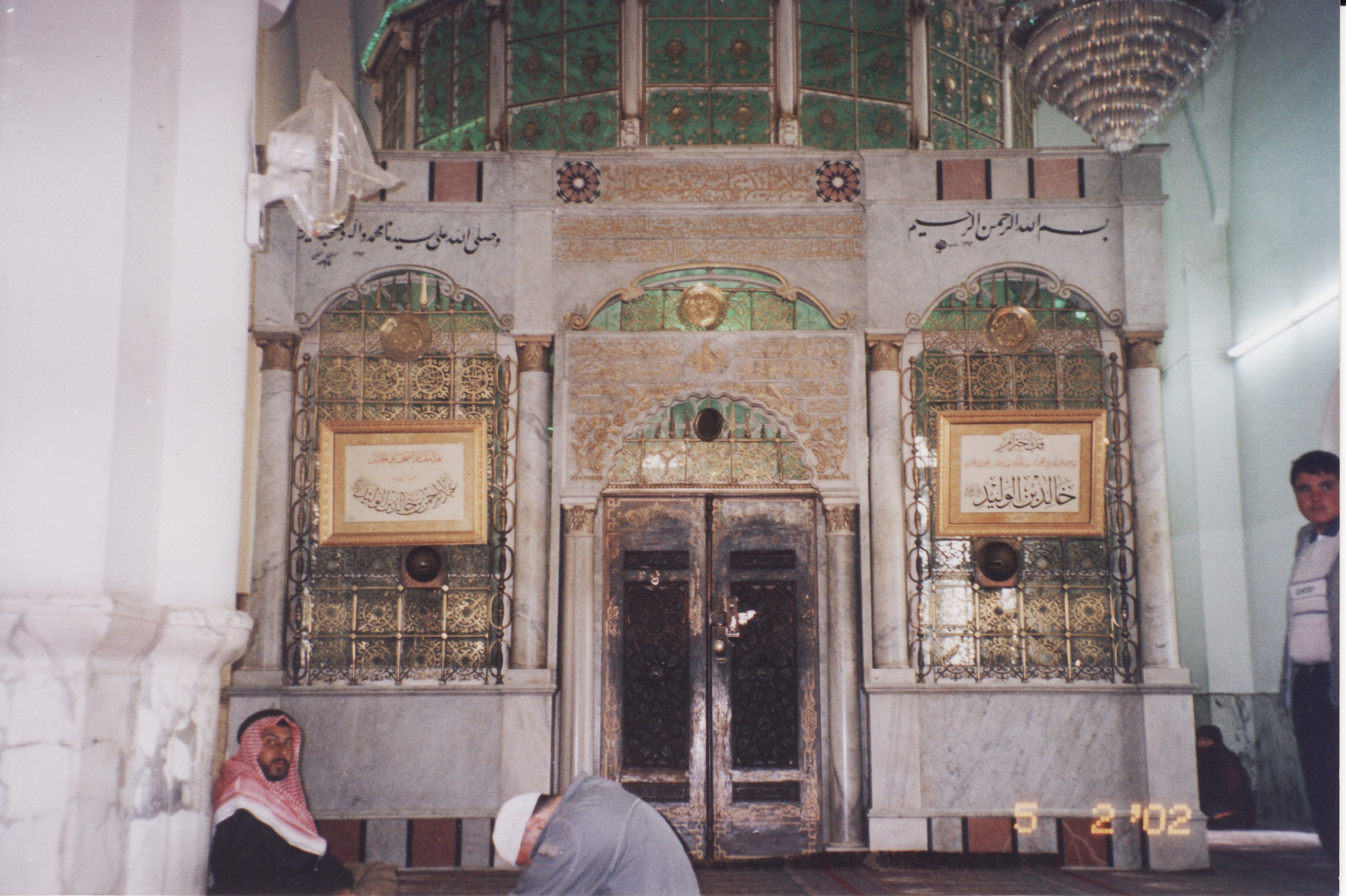
The alleged tomb of Khalid, located inside the Khalid ibn al-Walid Mosque

Historical records predominantly agree that Khalid succumbed to illness in 21 AH (642 CE), though accounts vary regarding the precise location of his death. This divergence has given rise to two primary narratives, each supported by early Islamic historians and offering distinct perspectives on Khalid's final moments and burial.

=== Location ===
According to Sayf ibn Umar, Khalid remained in Medina until Umar believed that public attachment to him had diminished, after which he intended to reinstate Khalid to military command upon returning from the Hajj pilgrimage. However, while Umar was away, Khalid fell gravely ill during a visit to his mother and returned to Medina, where she cared for him until his death. Upon hearing of his condition, Umar hastened back from Hajj, reportedly covering a three-day distance in a single night, but arrived after Khalid had died. At the funeral, early sources including Abū Ḥudhayfa Isḥāq ibn Bishr al-Qurashī and Sayf ibn Umar report that Khalid's mother delivered a eulogy praising her son as braver than a lion, a fierce protector, and more generous than a flood pouring through the mountains. Moved by her words, Umar is said to have declared that no woman could give birth to a man like Khalid. Although some traditions attribute to Umar a general prohibition against public wailing, historical reports suggest he himself grieved deeply at Khalid's death. The women of the Banu Makhzum, observed a mourning period lasting seven days, during which they expressed their sorrow by tearing their garments and striking their faces. Some even shaved their heads as a mark of grief, actions Umar permitted so long as they refrained from excessive lamentation.

On the other hand, al-Waqidi, Ibn Sa'd, and Al-Dhahabi assert that Khalid died in Homs. Their accounts describe how Umar, while present at the Quba Mosque in Medina, received news of Khalid's demise from Yemeni pilgrims who had settled in Homs. These travelers reported that Khalid had died on the very day of their departure from the city. Umar wept, repeating the Islamic invocation “Indeed, we belong to Allah, and indeed, to Him we return” several times, and prayed extensively for Khalid's mercy, then say: "By Allah, he was a shield against the enemy, blessed in his leadership. Ibn Hajar corroborates the existence of these two traditions, noting one view that Khalid died in Homs and another that he died in Medina, with Umar attending his funeral.

According to an authentic narration recorded by Abd Allah ibn al-Mubarak and Al-Dhahabi, when death approached, Khalid is reported to have said:

I sought martyrdom on the battlefield, but it was decreed that I would die in my bed. There is no deed of mine that has given me greater hope, after La ilaha illa Allah (There is no God but Allah), than a night spent on my horse, bearing my shield, while the sky rains upon me, waiting for dawn until we attack the Kuffar (disbelievers). When I die, look at my weapons and my horse, and use them in preparation [for Jihad] in the cause of Allah.

=== Umar's Reflections ===
Following Khalid's death, some purported narrations state that Umar expressed regret over how he had treated him, including dismissing him or dealing with him harshly. During Khalid's lifetime, Umar had objected to his generous spending, but after learning that Khalid had died leaving only his horse, servant, and weapons, he reportedly acknowledged that his view of Khalid had changed. He later described Khalid's death as a significant loss to Islam, stating that it had created a breach that could not be mended. He also wished Khalid had lived longer, saying he would have desired it even if only a single stone remained in al-Ḥimā. (Note: Al-Hima was a protected grazing land under Umar’s control, reserved for key uses like supporting the caliphate’s cavalry or community needs. In the narration, Umar says, "By Allah, if only he had remained alive as long as a single stone remained in al-Hima!" Stones there are solid and lasting, unlike grass or animals. Umar uses this to show he wished Khalid had lived much longer, reflecting his regret and longing after Khalid’s death—missing him despite past criticism.) On another occasion, Umar expressed admiration for Khalid and warned that anyone who rejoiced at his misfortune would incur the wrath of Allah. Before his death, Umar stated that had three particular individuals, including Khalid, still been alive, he would have chosen one of them as his successor rather than appointing a committee of six.

Khalid, for his part, also came to terms with his strained relationship with Umar. During his final illness, he confided in Abu Darda, acknowledging Umar's importance to Islam and warning that, after Umar's death, changes would rise that Abu Darda would disapprove of. He then added:

At first, I resented Umar for some of the things he did. But as I lay ill and reflected, with the presence of Allah before me, I realized that Umar had only sought Allah’s will in all his actions. I resented him when he sent someone to divide my wealth with me, taking even a single sandal while leaving me with the other. But then I saw that he did the same with others who had precedence in Islam and had fought at Badr. He was harsh with me, yet I saw that he was just as harsh with others. I thought my family ties (Note: Khalid is Umar's maternal uncle, and they bear a close resemblance to each other. Their similarity goes beyond facial features and height, extending to their personality and psychological strength.) to him would matter, but I realized that he cared nothing for kinship or the blame of others when it came to Allah. That was what erased any grievance I had against him. He rebuked me often, but it was always for the sake of the people. I was in the midst of battle, seeing things firsthand, while he was absent, ruling from afar—so I acted differently than he would have. Despite this, I have entrusted my will, my estate, and the execution of my final wishes to Umar ibn al-Khattab.

== Aftermath and Legacy ==
Expansion of Rashidun Caliphate

Khalid's death aligned with the Rashidun Caliphate’s shift from rapid conquests to consolidation, with generals emphasizing siege warfare and establishing garrison cities like Kufa and Fustat. His victories laid the groundwork for a transition to a professional army. Under the Umayyads, the focus shifted to administration, defense, and naval warfare, diverging from Khalid’s mobile tactics and reflecting the evolution from a conquest state to an administrative empire. Although military priorities shifted after his death, Khalid’s battlefield achievements and his role in the early Islamic conquests remained central to his legacy, contributing to his enduring reputation as a highly skilled and undefeated military commander.

Khalid is generally recognized in both early Islamic sources and modern scholarship for his military leadership and success on the battlefield. Early Islamic sources portray him as the most effective leader during the early Muslim conquests, with Richard Blackburn calling him "Islam’s most formidable warrior" for his campaigns under Muhammad, Abu Bakr, and during the conquest of Syria. R. Stephen Humphreys, David Nicolle, and John Bagot Glubb similarly regard him the most famous and successful Arab commander of the early expansion of Islam. His battlefield impact was recognized even before his conversion to Islam, with M.A. Shaban attributing the Quraysh's victory at the Battle of Uhud—Muhammad's only military defeat—to Khalid's "military genius." His pivotal role in the Ridda Wars earned him the title of "hero" from Tamim Ansary, who also lists him among Islam's leading generals. David Nicolle further emphasizes Khalid's ability to win battles with numerically inferior forces, citing the Battle of Walaja as a case study that continues to draw interest in military scholarship. Al-Baladhuri records that Muslim armies would often choose him as their commander for his valor, strategic acumen, and the perceived good fortune of his counsel. Agha Ibrahim Akram attributes his success to a combination of charisma and leadership, which helped unite tribal warriors against the larger Byzantine army.

Modern historians also emphasize Khalid's tactical innovations, such as his use of rapid maneuvering and psychological warfare. Fletcher Pratt credits him with developing light cavalry tactics into an effective tool against numerically superior forces. John Walter Jandora notes Khalid's "ingenuity" and "superior leadership" at Battle of Yarmouk, a victory that he views as critical to the Caliphate’s eventual expansion from the Pyrenees mountains to Central Asia. Likewise, Peter Malcolm Holt emphasizes Khalid’s strategic vision during the Ridda Wars and the Syrian campaigns, particularly his "desert march" and victories, which Muslims widely celebrate as milestones in Islamic history. Expanding on this, Hugh N. Kennedy describes Khalid's "desert march" as both a historical and legendary feat, praised by Arab sources for his endurance and by modern scholars for its strategic mastery.

Khalid's legacy continues to be examined in historical and modern studies. Fred Donner describes him as one of Islam's greatest military tacticians, while Carole Hillenbrand calls him the most famous Arab commander in history. Nicolle regard him as one of the greatest tacticians and cavalry commanders in history. Justin Marozzi refers to him as the "military brains" behind the unification of Arabia under Muhammad, though his major contributions came after Muhammad's death. Moshe Gil calls Khalid's desert march "a feat which has no parallel".Philip K. Hitti compares Khalid's campaigns to those of Napoleon, Hannibal, and Alexander the Great, while Roy Casagranda likens his record to that of Thutmose III and Alexander, arguing that his victories reshaped 7th-century geopolitics. Abbas Mahmoud al-Aqqad contends that Khalid surpassed Alexander and Belisarius by achieving greater victories with fewer resources, notably at Yarmouk, cementing his status as a preeminent military leader in history. W. Montgomery Watt acknowledges him as "one of the creators of the Arab empire" due to his "superb generalship" after Muhammad's death, while Nicolle emphasizes his role as a hero and symbol of Arab nationalism, with streets named after him across the Arab world, as noted by Kennedy. William Muir similarly described Khalid as the most prominent figure in early Islam after Abu Bakr and Umar, and regarded him as one of the greatest generals in history for leading key victories that he believed were crucial to Islam's survival and expansion.

== Bibliography ==
- Athamina, Khalil (1994). "The Appointment and Dismissal of Khālid b. al-Walīd from the Supreme Command: A Study of the Political Strategy of the Early Muslim Caliphs in Syria". Arabica. 41 (2): 253–272. doi:10.1163/157005894X00191. JSTOR 4057449.
- Juynboll, Gautier H.A., ed. (1989). The History of al-Ṭabarī, Volume XIII: The Conquest of Iraq, Southwestern Persia, and Egypt: The Middle Years of ʿUmar's Caliphate, A.D. 636–642/A.H. 15–21. SUNY Series in Near Eastern Studies. Albany, New York: State University of New York Press. ISBN 978-0-88706-876-8.
