= Angela Kim Harkins =

Korean-American academic

Angela Kim Harkins is a Professor of New Testament and Professor Ordinaria at Boston College School of Theology and Ministry.

== Early life and education ==
Harkins was born in Seoul, South Korea and grew up in the northwest side of Chicago, Illinois. She completed her undergraduate (B.A. Hons., 1994, Theology major and Philosophy minor) at Loyola University, Chicago and went on to complete a M.A. degree in the Department of Theology at the University of Notre Dame, concentrating on biblical languages. She studied at Hebrew University in Jerusalem, Israel, 1997-98, with funding from a Fulbright fellowship, a year that coincided with the fiftieth anniversary of the discovery of the Dead Sea Scrolls. She returned to Notre Dame to begin her PhD studies in Christianity and Judaism, where she also minored in Syriac exegesis and liturgical theology. Her dissertation on the Qumran Hodayot, Signs of editorial shaping of the Hodayot collection: a redactional analysis of 1QHa-b and 4QHa-f (2003) was later published as a series of articles.

== Career ==
Harkins was a tenured Associate Professor in the Religious Studies Department and a member of the Judaic Studies faculty at Fairfield University in Connecticut, where she was awarded the Distinguished Teaching Award by the College of Arts and Sciences in 2011. She then held a Marie Curie International Incoming Fellowship at the University of Birmingham in the United Kingdom to undertake research on religious experience at Qumran. Following that fellowship, she joined the Boston College School of Theology and Ministry as an Associate Professor of the New Testament and an Ordinary Professor in their Ecclesiastical Faculty. She was promoted to the rank of full Professor in 2023.

Harkins is an active member of the Society of Biblical Literature and is the co-chair of the Prayer in Antiquity program unit. She has also served as chair of the Religious Experience in Antiquity section. She also serves on the steering committee of the Qumran and Dead Sea Scrolls program unit of the International Society of Biblical Literature. In 2022, Harkins will have completed her second term on the Status of Women in the Profession Committee of the SBL. In 2022, she began a term on the Professional Conduct Committee of the SBL. Harkins has been a member of the Catholic Biblical Association since 2004 (assoc. 1997). She is currently the chair of the Professional Conduct Committee of the CBA and has served as chair of the Program Committee. Harkins is a past board member of the Lilly National Network Board, an organization whose mission is to strengthen the quality and character of church-related institutions of higher learning in America. She currently sits on the board of Collegium: A Colloquy of Faith and Intellectual Life.

In 2022, Harkins became the lead editor of the Journal of Ancient Judaism, a position that she shares with Jonathan Klawans (Boston University). The founding editors of this journal are Maxine Grossman, Alex Jassen, and Armin Lange. The Journal of Ancient Judaism is now published in Leiden by Brill.

== Research interests ==
Harkins is interested in prayer in the Second Temple and early Christian periods, the instrumental role of emotion in reading and ritual experiences, and the history of interpretation of scripture by both Jewish and Christian communities. Much of her scholarship has focused on the Qumran prayer collection known as the Hodayot (the Thanksgiving Hymns), but other texts of interest include the so-called penitential prayers from the Second Temple period; the Dead Sea Scrolls and Pseudepigrapha; the New Testament; and the Psalms and Odes of Solomon. Her interests also extend to Jewish and Christian relations in antiquity and in the modern period. Harkins is a Christian Leaders Initiative Fellow (2012-13), appointed by the American Jewish Committee and the Shalom Hartman Institute (Jerusalem). Harkins is currently working on a long term project on the early Christian work known as the Shepherd of Hermas. Her recent book on the Shepherd is entitled: An Embodied Reading of the Shepherd of Hermas: The Book of Visions and Its Role in Moral Formation, Sheffield: Equinox, 2023.

== Bibliography ==
=== Books ===
- 2023 An Embodied Reading of the Shepherd of Hermas: The Book of Visions and its Role in Moral Formation. Studies in Ancient Religion & Culture. Sheffield: Equinox.
- 2022 Experiencing the Shepherd of Hermas. Edited by Angela Kim Harkins and Harry O. Maier. Ekstasis 10. Berlin: De Gruyter Press.
- 2022 Experiencing Presence in the Second Temple Period: Revised and Updated Essays. Contributions to Biblical Exegesis & Theology 111. Leuven: Peeters Press.
- 2021 Selected Studies on Deuterocanonical Prayers. Edited by Angela Kim Harkins and Barbara Schmitz. Contributions to Biblical Exegesis and Theology 103. Leuven: Peeters Press.
- 2015 Religious Experience and the Dead Sea Scrolls. Edited by Angela Kim Harkins and Mladen Popoviç. Dead Sea Discoveries 22.3.
- 2014 The Watchers in Jewish and Christian Traditions. Edited by Angela Kim Harkins, Kelley Coblentz Bautch, John Endres, S.J. Minneapolis: Fortress Press.
- 2014 The Fallen Angels Traditions: Second Temple Developments and Reception History. Edited by Angela Kim Harkins, Kelley Coblentz Bautch and John Endres, S.J. CBQMS 53. Washington, D.C.: The Catholic Biblical Association.
- 2012 A Teacher for All Generations: Essays in Honor of James C. VanderKam. 2 Vols. Edited by Eric F. Mason (gen. editor); Vol. 1 edited by Samuel Thomas, Alison Schofield, and Eugene C. Ulrich; Vol. 2 edited by Kelley Coblentz Bautch, Angela Kim Harkins and Daniel Machiela. Supplements to the Journal for the Study of Judaism 153. Leiden: Brill.
- 2012 (re-printed in paperback in 2018) Reading with an 'I' to the Heavens: Looking at the Qumran Hodayot through the Lens of Visionary Traditions. Ekstasis: Religious Experience from Antiquity to the Medieval Period 3; Berlin: de Gruyter Press.
