= Ibn Muṭarrif al-Ṭarafī =

Abū ʿAbdallāh Muḥammad ibn Aḥmad ibn Muṭarrif al-Kinānī al-Ṭarafī (born Cordova 386 AH / 997 CE, d. 454 AH / 1062 CE) was a prominent Andalusi scholar, noted today particularly for a book of stories about the Islamic prophets.

== Life ==
According to Ibn al-Jazarī, al-Ṭarafī was imām in the Cordova mosque Ṭarafa, and it was this role that gave him his epithet.

== Works ==
Al-Ṭarafī is known to have composed Sharḥ qaṣāʾid fī l-qirāʾāt; Kitāb al-Qurṭayn, which gathers passages from Ibn Qutayba's Kitāb mushkil al-Qurʾān and Kitāb ghafīb al-Qurʾān and arranges them to be in the same order as the relevant Qurʾān chapters; and an abridgement of the Tafsīr al-Ṭabarī.

He is best known today, however, for his Tārīkh al-Rusul wa al-Mulūk, a collection of biographies of the Islamic prophets, an early example of the genre known in Arabic as qiṣaṣ al-anbiyāʾ. Unlike some qiṣaṣ al-anbiyāʾ, al-Ṭarafī's does not attempt to put the figures it discusses into historical chronological order, but rather in order of appearance in the Qurʾān, starting with twenty-four mentioned by name and proceeding to seven to whom be believed it alludes, and excluding figures mentioned in the Qurʾān who he thought not to have prophetic status (such as Dhū al-Qarnayn). He adhered closely to Sunnite exegetical tradition. His numerous sources included now-lost works: Wahb ibn Munabbih's Kitāb zabūr Dāwūd (Book of the Psalms of David) and the otherwise unknown qiṣaṣ al-anbiyāʾ collection written by one Aḥmad ibn Khālid, along with (directly or indirectly) Isḥāq ibn Bishr's Mubtadaʾ, at least one unidentified Qurʾān commentary, and other sources besides.

== Editions and translations ==
- Roberto Tottoli, "Le Qiṣaṣ al-Anbiyāʾ di Ṭarafi" (PhD thesis, Istituto Universitario Orientale, Naples, 1996).
