= Hubayrah ibn Sabal =

Companion of the Islamic prophet Muhammad

Hubayrah ibn Sabal ibn al-‘Ajlān al-Thaqafī (Arabic: هبيرة بن سبل بن العجلان الثقفي) was a companion of the Islamic prophet Muhammad. It is narrated that he was the first person Muhammad ordered to lead prayers in Mecca after its conquest in 8 AH (630). It is also narrated that when Muhammad departed for Ta'if that year, he left Hubayrah in charge of Mecca. Then, after he returned from Ta'if and prepared to depart for Medina, he appointed Attab ibn Asid as governor. Al-Dhahabi writes about Hubayrah, "He governed Mecca before Attab ibn Asid for a few days."

He was a member of the Thaqif tribe and accepted Islam in 6 AH (628) at Hudaybiyyah. His genealogy according to Ibn al-Kalbi is: Hubayrah ibn Sabal ibn al-‘Ajlān ibn ‘Attāb ibn Mālik ibn Ka‘b ibn ‘Amr ibn Sa‘d ibn ‘Awf ibn Thaqīf. His father's name is disagreed upon. According to Ibn al-Furat, al-Khatib al-Baghdadi dotted it as سبل Sabal. Al-Daraqutni has it as شبل Shibl. Ibn Hajar also found the second spelling in a manuscript of al-Fakihi's history of Mecca.
