= The Interpretation of Conflicting Narrations =

The Interpretation of Conflicting Narrations or Treatise on Hadith Differences (Arabic: Ta’wīl Mukhtalif al-Hadīth) is a book written by Ibn Qutaybah (828 – 885 CE / 213 – 276 AH), a renowned Islamic scholar of the Golden Age of Islam, in which he defends and reconciles hadiths that Mu'tazilites and later Quranists dismissed as contradictory or irrational.

The Interpretation was cited by the Christian author Bulus ibn Raja' in his Kitab al-wadih bi-l-haqq around 1010 to highlight the contradictions of the hadiths. It was translated and edited by Gerard Lecomte as Le traité des divergences du hadit d'Ibn Qutayba (Damascus: Institut Français du Damas, 1962, xlviii, 460 p. 25 cm.).
