= Qisas al-Anbiya =

Genre of Islamic literature on the history and stories of prophets

The Qiṣaṣ al-anbiyāʾ (Arabic: قِصَص الْأَنـۢبِيَاء, lit. 'Stories of the Prophets') is any of various collections of stories about figures recognised as prophets and messengers in Islam, closely related to tafsīr (exegesis of the Qur'an).

Since the Quran refers only parabolically to the stories of the prophets, assuming the audience is able to complete the rest from their own knowledge, it became necessary to store the version the original audience had in mind to keep the purpose of the message, when Islam met other cultures during its expansion.

Authors of these texts drew on many traditions available to medieval Islamic civilization, such as those of Asia, Africa, China, and Europe. Many of these scholars were also authors of commentaries on the Qurʾān; unlike Qurʾān commentaries, however, which follow the order and structure of the Qurʾān itself, the qiṣaṣ told its stories of the prophets in chronological order, which makes them similar to the Jewish and Christian versions of the Bible. The narrations within the Qiṣaṣ al-anbiyāʾ frequently emphasise wisdom and moral teachings rather than limiting themselves to historical-style narratives.

Islamic scholars and theologians have consistently regarded the writings in Qiṣaṣ al-Anbiyāʾ as unreliable for studying the lives of prophets and messengers in Islam or for historical research, and disapprove of them. Abdul Wahhab Najjar's (1862–1941) qaṣaṣ (قصص الأنبياء : لقد كان في قصصهم) explained the stories of the prophets solely based on Quranic sources, and is diametrically opposed to earlier ones. However, they share the chronological structure of earlier Qiṣaṣ al-Anbiyāʾ and a summary of the prophetic moral lessons.

== Content ==
The Qiṣaṣ usually begin with the creation of the world and its various creatures, including angels, and culminate in Adam. Following the stories of Adam and his family come the tales of Idris; Nuh and Shem; Hud and Salih; Abraham, Ishmail and his mother Hagar; Lot; Isaac, Jacob and Esau, and Joseph; Shuaib; Moses and his brother Aaron; Khidr; Joshua, Eleazar, and Elijah; the kings Samuel, Saul, David, and Solomon; Jonah; Dhu al-Kifl, and Dhu al-Qarnayn; all the way up to and including John the Baptist and Jesus, son of Mary. Sometimes the author incorporated related local folklore or oral traditions, and many of the Qiṣaṣ al-'Anbiyāʾs tales echo medieval Christian and Jewish stories.

== History ==
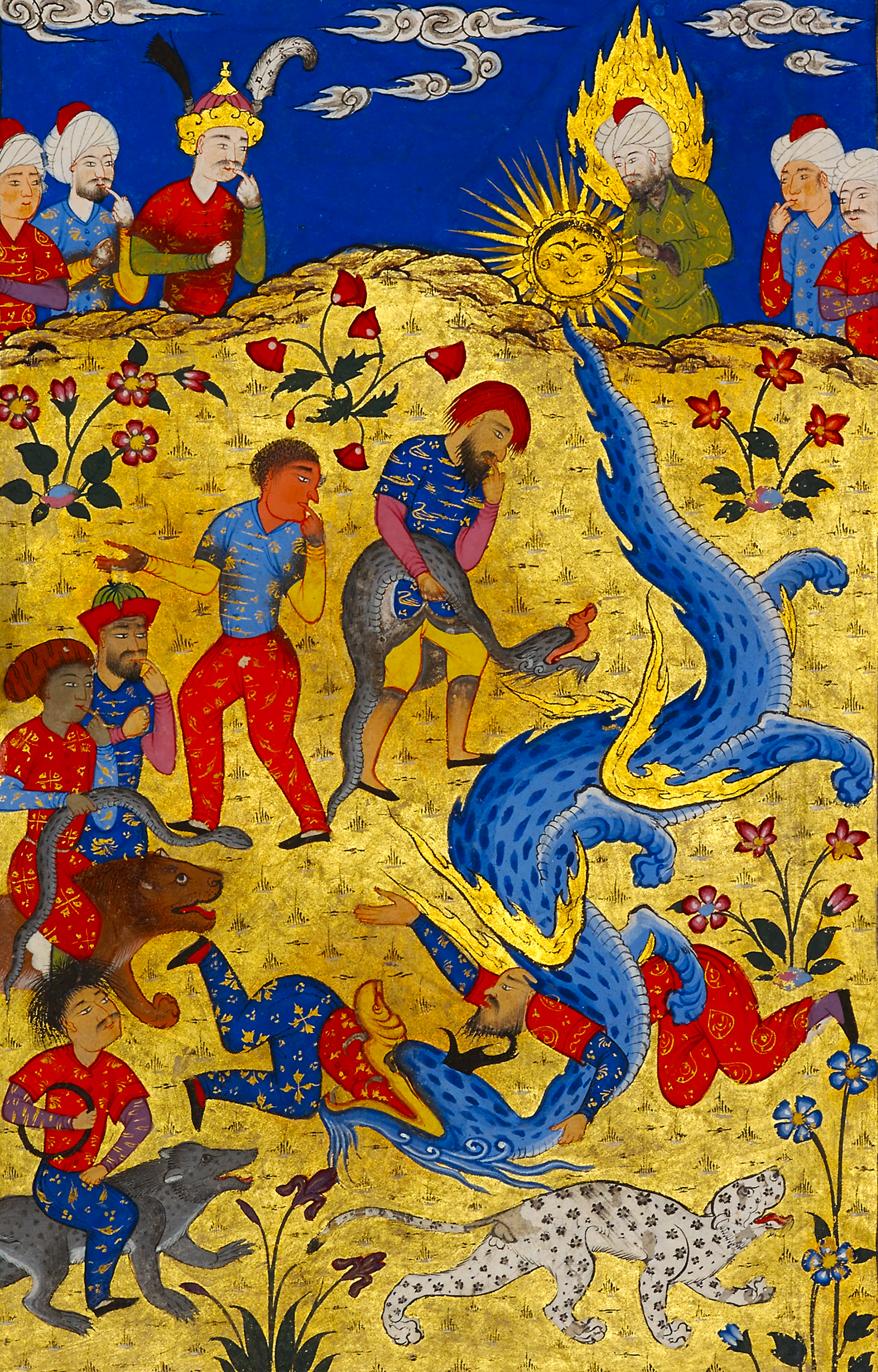
Pharaoh watches a serpent devour his servant in the presence of Moses; from a 1577 Qasas al-Anbiya manuscript

The Qurʾān frequently mentions and uses stories of biblical figures, but only in the case of Joseph son of Jacob does it narrate a prophet's story in a linear, complete form. Implicitly the original audiences of the Qurʾān had enough knowledge of these biblical figures to understand the allusions, but subsequent early Muslims felt the need for more information about these figures, who came in Islam to be known as prophets (أنبياء, anbiyāʾ). Particularly influential sources of biblical knowledge, whose information was transmitted by later Muslim scholars, were ʿAbdullāh ibn Salām (d. 663), Kaʿb al-Aḥbār (d. c. 652), and Wahb ibn Munabbih (d. c. 730); their information underpinned the first written expositions of the Qurʾān's allusions to biblical figures, tafsir (exegetical commentaries). These commentaries inspired a tradition of historical writing that began to present biblical figures in a more linear, narrative form; the principal work of this kind was the Tarikh al-rusul wa-l-muluk by al-Tabari (839–923).

Alongside written commentaries in the early Islamic period, under the Umayyad Caliphate, people paid storytellers (quṣṣāṣ) to preach about religion; they communicated legends about biblical figures that circulated both orally and in writing among Jewish, Christian, and Muslim communities. Along with preachers during Friday prayers, they were the first paid functionaries of Islam. From the eighth century, they were increasingly disparaged as folkloric preachers, and were disregarded by institutional scholars (ʿulamāʾ).

By the early ninth century CE the tradition of both written commentaries and oral storytelling inspired collections of fully narrated biographies of the prophets, and these Qiṣaṣ al-anbiyāʾ became a distinct genre of Islamic literature: the earliest to survive are Mubtadaʾ al-dunyā wa-qaṣaṣ al-anbiyāʾ by Abū Ḥudhayfa Isḥāq ibn Bishr Qurashī (d. 821) and the Kitāb badʾ al-khalq wa-qaṣaṣ al-anbiyāʾ of ʿUmāra ibn Wathīma (died 902). Perhaps the most important work, characterised by Roberto Tottoli as "probably the most comprehensive collection of stories of the prophets, and [...] the most widely known in the Arab world", was Abū Isḥāq al-Thaʿlabī ʿArāʾis al-majālis fī qaṣaṣ al-anbiyāʾ, from around the early eleventh century.

Like the Qurʾānic commentaries or Jewish haggadic texts, however, the Qaṣaṣ are often didactic rather than simply narrative. Unlike the Qurʾān, the Qiṣaṣ were never considered as binding or authoritative by theologians. Instead, the purpose of the Qiṣaṣ al-Anbiyāʾ was to offer Muslims complementary material based on the Qurʾān, to explain the signs of God, and the reasons for the advent of the prophets. Themselves derived from Jewish and Christian texts, Qiṣaṣ al-anbiyāʾ went on to influence Jewish writing within the majority-Muslim world: for example, the fourteenth-century Jewish scholar Shāhin-i Shirāzi drew on such sources.

During the mid-sixteenth century, several illuminated versions of the Qiṣaṣ — such as Zubdat al-Tawarikh and Siyer-i Nebi — were created by Ottoman authors and miniature painters. According to Milstein et al., "iconographical study [of the texts] reveals ideological programs and clichés typical of the Ottoman polemical discourse with its Shi'ite rival in Iran, and its Christian neighbours in the West."

== Major works ==
author	title	date (CE)	language	modern translations
Abū Ḥudhayfa Isḥāq ibn Bishr Qurashī	Mubtadaʾ al-dunyā wa-qaṣaṣ al-anbiyāʾ	c. 800	Arabic	
ʿUmāra ibn Wathīma	Kitāb badʾ al-khalq wa-qaṣaṣ al-anbiyāʾ	ninth century	Arabic	French
al-Ṭabarī	Tārīkh al-Rusul wa al-Mulūk	early tenth century	Arabic	English
Baḷʿamī	Tarikhnama	tenth century	Persian	
Abū Isḥāq al-Thaʿlabī	ʿArāʾis al-majālis fī qaṣaṣ al-anbiyāʾ	early eleventh century	Arabic	English, German
Ibn Muṭarrif al-Ṭarafī	Qaṣaṣ al-anbiyāʾ	earlier eleventh century	Arabic	Italian
Abū Naṣr Aḥmad al-Bukhārī	Tāj al-qaṣaṣ	c. 1081	Persian	
Muḥammad al-Kisāʾī	Qaṣaṣ al-anbiyāʾ	c. 1100	Arabic	English, Hebrew
Abū Ishāq Ibrāhīm ibn Mansūr ibn Khalaf		twelfth century		
Nāṣir al-Dīn ibn Burhān al-Dīn Rabghūzī	Qaṣaṣ-i Rabghūzī	1310/1311	Khwārazm Turkish	English
Mustafa of Erzurum	Siyer-i Nebi	fourtheenth century	Ottoman Turkish	
Ibn Kathir	Qaṣaṣ al-anbiyāʾ	fourteenth century	Arabic	
Muḥammad Rabadán	Discurso de la luz de Muhamad	1603	Spanish	

== See also ==
- Biblical and Quranic narratives
- Cave of Treasures
- History of the Prophets and Kings
- History of the Quran
- Islamic mythology
- List of legends in the Quran
- List of biographies of Muhammad
- Midrash Rabbah
- Prophets and messengers in Islam

== Sources ==
- Wheeler, Brannon. Stories of the Prophets—illuminated manuscript pages
- Milstein, Rachel, Karin Ruhrdanz, and Barbara Schmitz (1999). Stories of the Prophets: Illustrated Manuscripts of Qasas al-Anbiya (Islamic Art & Architecture Series, No. 8). Mazda Publishers, Inc.
- Qasas-ul-Anbiya—EasyIslam
- Qasas-ul-Anbiya.in Qasas Ul Anbiya in hindi
- KAZI Publications Inc.: Tales of the Prophets (Qasas al-anbiya)
- Stories of the Prophets—World Digital Library
