= Wathima ibn Musa =

Persian Muslim historian and silk trader

Wathīma ibn Mūsā (Note: Khoury 2002 gives his full name as Wathīma ibn Mūsā ibn al-Furāt al-Fārisī al-Fasawī al-Azhar al-Ghanī.) (died 9 December 851), nicknamed al-Washshāʾ ('trader in embroideries'), was a Persian Muslim historian and silk trader.

Born in the city of Fasā, Wathīma moved first to Baṣra, then to Egypt and to al-Andalus before returning to Egypt, where he settled in the city of Fusṭāṭ. He studied ḥadīth (traditions) and, according to Ibn al-Faraḍī, this was the purpose of his travels to the West. He wrote a Kitāb fī Akhbār al-ridda, an Arabic account of the great apostasy of 632. It is a lost work, although at least 110 passages from it are quoted by other authors, including Ibn Khallikān, (Note: Ibn Khallikān's entry on Wathīma in his biographical dictionary can be found in Mac Guckin de Slane 1868, pp. 647–656.) Ibn Shākir al-Kutubī, Yāqūt al-Rūmī and Ibn Ḥajar al-ʿAsqalānī. It was praised for its literary quality and its breadth by Ibn al-ʿImād.

Wathīma died in Fusṭāṭ. He had a son, ʿUmāra ibn Wathīma, who was born in Fusṭāṭ. The Kitāb badʾ al-khalq wa-qiṣaṣ al-anbiyāʾ, a collection of legends of the prophets, is attributed to ʿUmāra, but is more probably the work of Wathīma.
