= Kitab al-wadih bi-l-haqq =

Copto-Arabic treatise against Islam

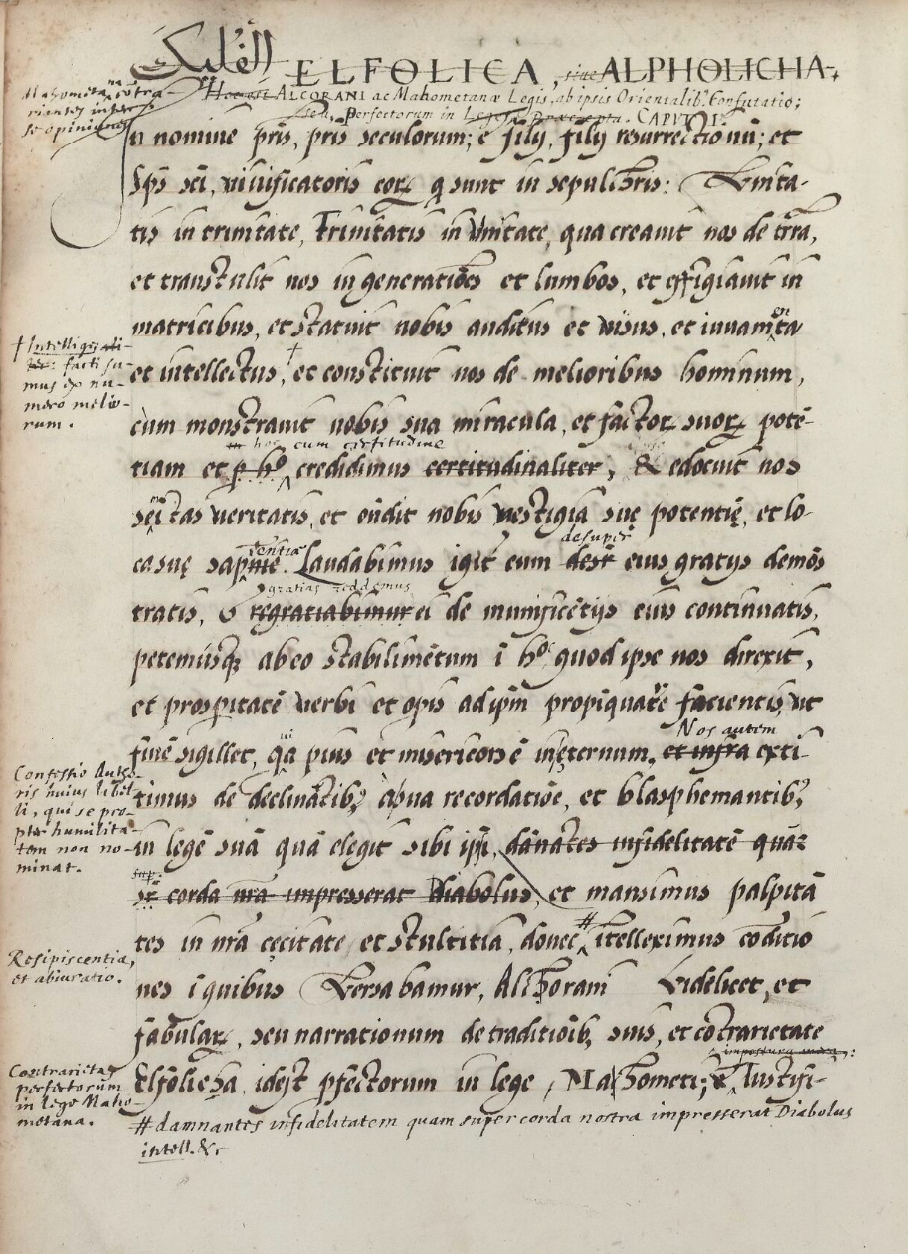
First page of the Latin Liber from its sole manuscript of the 16th century

The Kitāb al-wāḍiḥ bi-l-ḥaqq (Arabic: كتاب الواضح بالحق), known in Latin as the Liber denudationis (lit. 'Book of Denuding'), is a Copto-Arabic apologetic treatise against Islam. It was written by a Muslim convert to Christianity, Būluṣ ibn Rajāʾ, around 1010 in Fāṭimid Egypt. Its purpose is to provide a refutation of Islam on the basis of the Qurʾān and the ḥadīth (tradition). It was translated into Latin in the 13th century, probably in Toledo. It had much greater influence in translation than in its original language.

== Title ==
The Kitāb al-wāḍiḥ bi-l-ḥaqq has a complicated title. The Arabic title is difficult to translate and has been translated many ways. The word kitāb means "book" and al-Wāḍiḥ was the author's nickname, meaning "one who exposes", "one who clarifies", "the exposer", "the clarifier" or "the unveiler". The phrase bi-l-ḥaqq recalls certain passages in the Qurʾān that refer to the kitāb bi-l-ḥaqq. This may be translated as "book [or scripture] with [regard to] the truth" or else as an emphatic expression, "the book in truth". It seems to indicate either that the work is true (by implication, truer than the Qurʾān) or that it is in some sense a divinely inspired revelation.

In his latest work, David Bertaina translates the title The Truthful Exposer, although he had earlier opted for Clarity in Truth. He suggests The Exposer's Book with the Truth or The Exposer's Truthful Book as slightly more literal options. The title has also been translated Book of Evidence; Book of al-Wāḍiḥ, taking it for a reference to the author; and Book of That Which is Clear. According to the History of the Patriarchs of Alexandria, the Kitāb al-wāḍiḥ was also known as al-Iʿtirāf, "The Confession". This alternative title is also found in the colophons of two manuscripts.

The full title chosen by the Latin translator, Liber denudationis siue ostensionis aut patefaciens, means "Book of Denuding or Exposing, or the Discloser". It may be derived from the alternative title Hatk al-Maḥjūb sometimes given to the Kitāb, which means "Disclosure of the Veiled" or "Unveiling of the Veiled". Ramon Llull refers to the work as the Liber Telif. At some point in the 17th century, a gloss was added to the sole Latin manuscript giving it the title Contrarietas alfolica, meaning "the disagreement of the fuqahā", that is, the Islamic jurists. This title may be a translation of the Arabic term ikhtilāf al-fuqahā. A corruption of ikhtilāf may explain Llull's word Telif. Alternatively, it may derive from the Arabic tālif al-fuqahā, "destroyer of the legists", a play on the established term with a stronger meaning. Contrarietas alfolica was for a long time the title by which it was known to scholarship. It comes from an expression in the first chapter (contrarietate elfolicha).

== Content ==
=== Subdivisions ===
The chapter divisions and titles of both the Arabic and Latin versions seem to be later scribal additions to the original. The Arabic version is divided into thirty chapters, plus an introduction, conclusion and appendix. Some Arabic chapters lack a title. The Latin version is divided into twelve chapters. The first chapter is introductory. Despite this difference in division, the order of the content is the same.

David Bertaina divides his Arabic–English edition into 254 numbered sections. Charles Lohr sees the Latin work as naturally dividing into five sections: chapters 1–2 are introductory, 3–5 concern Muḥammad, 6–9 concern the Qurʾān, 10 is a defence of Christian doctrine and 11–12 are appendices.

=== Synopsis ===
The work begins with a Christian invocation reminiscent of the Islamic basmala:

In the name of the Father, the Father of Ages, and of the Son, the Son of Resurrection, and of the Holy Spirit, the Enlivener of those who are in the tombs, united in Trinity, triple in unity, the Lord of lords and the God of the world and the ages.

The introduction continues with praise of God, an explanation of the author's conversion and the purpose of his writing, which is to "clarify to my opponents their error and their unbelief" on the basis of the Qurʾān and the ḥadīth.

Ibn Rajāʾ classifies Muslims into four categories: those compelled by violence; sincere believers, who are deluded by Satan; mere followers, who continue in the faith of their parents without true belief because it is better than paganism; and those who follow Islam for worldly reasons. He then cites a ḥadīth according to which Muḥammad predicted that his followers would divide into 73 sects, only one of which would be saved. Every Muslim believes he is one of the saved.

Opening of the Kitāb in an Arabic copy of 1565

The Christian Bible is defended against the Muslim claim that it is corrupted. This is followed by an attack on Muḥammad's prophethood, which is anticipated in neither the Old nor the New Testament. Ibn Rajāʾ cites ḥadīths to show that Muḥammad did not perform miracles. Since his ministry rested on no earlier revelation and no miracles, it depended on coercion (jihād). The only biblical category Muḥammad fits is that of false prophet.

Ibn Rajāʾ describes Muḥammad as being educated by the Christian monk Baḥīrā and two Jewish rabbis. The Qurʾān was compiled after his death. There were originally seven conflicting versions until Abū Bakr selected one and destroyed the others. He cites the Qurʾān (3:7) to show that Muḥammad himself did not fully understand it. He especially criticizes Muḥammad's marital practices (his infatuation with Māriya al-Qibṭiyya, his repudiation of Sawda bint Zamʿa and his marriage to the divorcée Zaynab bint Jaḥsh). Moreover, Muḥammad could only speak Arabic, whereas the Apostles had been given the gift of tongues at Pentecost. This hardly indicates that he had a universal mission.

The critique of Muḥammad as prophet is followed by an extended critique of the Qurʾān, which Thomas Burman calls the "dullest, and most petty [part] of the whole tract". Numerous contradictions are claimed. The lives of Muḥammad and Jesus are contrasted with the goal of showing that Jesus is a superior prophet and that the Qurʾān itself points to Jesus as the Son of God. Ibn Rajāʾ then offers a defence of the doctrine of the Incarnation and the Crucifixion.

The main portion of the book ends with a series of critiques of the Ḥajj (based in part on personal experience), the Islamic prohibition on wine and Muḥammad's Night Journey. It is followed by a short conclusion and an appendix demonstrating more contradictions in the Qurʾān.

=== Sources ===
The Qurʾān had a profound influence on the style of the Arabic Kitāb. Ibn Rajāʾ cites it about 170 times and nearly half of the chapters in the Arabic text address it. He cites about 30 distinct ḥadīths, including both Sunnī and Ismāʿīlī ones. He only gives a full isnād (line of transmission) for a ḥadīth on twelve occasions. He names eight contemporary Egyptian scholars as his sources for these, including his father. He also cites tafsīr (commentaries).

Ibn Rajāʾ was not averse to using intra-Islamic disputes. He uses Ismāʿīlī and Muʿtazilī arguments against Sunnīs. He seems to have been familiar and made use of al-Qāḍī al-Nuʿmān's Disagreements of the Jurists, Ibn Qutayba's Treatise on Ḥadīth Differences and the arguments of Ibrāhīm al-Naẓẓām. He cites anti-Umayyad ḥadīths of Shīʿī origin, including one that claims the Caliph Muʿāwiya I died a Christian with a golden cross around his neck. He also cites several events that show a knowledge of Islamic history, including the sack of Mecca in 930 by Qarmatian leader al-Jannābī.

== Textual history ==
=== Date and authorship ===
The Kitāb was written no earlier than August 1009, since it refers to 400 years having passed since, according to one ḥadīth, Muḥammad prophesied that the world would end in 100 years. This almost certainly refers to the year 400 in the Islamic calendar, which began in August 1009. The book was probably completed by 1012. It was written during—and probably in response to—an intense period of persecution of Christians initiated by the Caliph al-Ḥākim (r. 996–1021).

The author of the Kitāb was Būluṣ ibn Rajāʾ. He was born in Cairo into a Muslim family in the 950s and received an Islamic education. In the 980s, he converted to Coptic Christianity, becoming a monk and later a priest. He wrote two other works, also in Arabic. He did not know Coptic. He wrote the Kitāb in the monastery of Saint Macarius the Great in the Wādī al-Naṭrūn.

=== Arabic circulation ===
How the Kitāb spread outside of Egypt is unknown. The Syriac Egyptian monastery of Dayr al-Suryān is possibly the vector by which it was transmitted to the Syriac world. It circulated among both the Syriac Orthodox and the Maronites. The Arabic Kitāb was at some point transmitted to Islamic Spain, where it circulated among the Mozarabs, native Arabic-speaking Christians. In 1013–1014, al-Ḥākim permitted Christians to leave Egypt with their belongings. It is possible that a copy of the Kitāb was brought to the West by refugees at this time. Some Copto-Arabic texts seem to have been brought to the West as a result of Coptic–Western contact during the Crusades, especially the Fifth Crusade (1217–1221).

There are a few passages in the Latin version that are absent in the surviving Arabic version, but which are probably original. The Arabic version may have circulated in long and short recensions, with only the latter preserved in Arabic but with the former partially preserved (abridged) in the Latin translation. A few minor discrepancies between the Arabic and Latin texts may also result from different Arabic recensions.

=== Latin translation ===
Title page of the only Latin copy

The scholarly consensus is that the Latin translation was made in Spain in the 13th century. It may have been translated by Mark of Toledo or his team around 1210. In the sole Latin manuscript, the Liber is copied after Mark's Latin translation of the Qurʾān. An alternative suggestion is that it was translated by Dominicans under the patronage of Archbishop Rodrigo Jiménez de Rada of Toledo (r. 1209–1247). If Ramon Martí, who made use of the work, had the Latin, rather than the Arabic, text before him, then it was translated before 1256. Otherwise, the terminus ante quem is 1299.

The Latin translation is a literal translation and not a paraphrase. The scribe of the sole surviving copy notes that the "translator … translated word for word". The scribe admits to omitting some material, however, including all of chapters 5 and 11. The thirteenth and final chapter of the Latin version is in fact a critique of Islam drawn from the works of Petrus Alfonsi of the 12th century. Its inclusion may be an error of the scribe. In addition, the Latin version contains some short polemical asides and glosses not found in the original. One of the most sizable additions to the Latin version is an argument against the miracle of the splitting of the Moon, which argues that the miracle would have caused massive tidal waves and is inconsistent with what is known of the size of the Moon from Aristotle. In one case, the translator changed Ibn Rajāʾ's theologically monophysite statement that Jesus "was one God perfectly incarnate with one nature, one hypostasis, and one will" into "the perfect and one God incarnate with two natures and two wills, a divine and a human." On the whole, the Latin text has been made to better align with the interests and beliefs of a Catholic audience.

=== Manuscripts ===
The Kitāb is preserved in whole or in part in four Arabic manuscripts. The only complete Arabic copy was in a private collection in Cairo, but its current whereabouts are unknown. A photocopy of the manuscript exists and has been digitized. It is a late copy, dating to the 18th or 19th century, but its content is accurate where it can be checked against other sources.

Chapters 21–26 of the Kitāb are contained in a manuscript copied at the Maronite monastery of Our Lady of Qannūbīn in 1470. It is now in Paris, Bibliothèque nationale de France, Syriaque 203. It is written in Garshuni, that is, Arabic in Syriac script, specifically of the Serto variety. The introduction and most of chapters 1–3 are contained in the manuscript Aleppo, Fondation Georges et Mathilde Salem, Arabic 202 (Sbath 1004), which was copied in 1565 by the scribe ʿAbd al-Masīḥ al-Mahdī, who also copied Ibn Rajāʾ's biography from the History of the Patriarchs. A partial copy made in 1760 is now in the monastery of Saint Anthony, catalogued as History 11.

The Latin translation of the Kitāb survives in a single manuscript, now in Paris, Bibliothèque nationale de France, Latin 3394. It was copied in Italy in the late 16th century in humanist cursive. It was copied from an early manuscript, probably of the 13th century and itself copied in a Dominican milieu. It has extensive annotations added by a 17th-century hand. In the early 14th century, Riccoldo da Monte di Croce quoted from and paraphrased it extensively in his Contra legem Sarracenorum, which is found in many manuscripts. Riccoldo's autograph manuscript survives.

=== Editions and scholarship ===
Paul Sbath (1887–1945) claimed in his Fihris that he had produced an edition and French translation of the Arabic Kitāb. It was never published.

The first scholars to make a serious study of the Kitāb were Marie-Thérèse d'Alverny and Norman Daniel in the mid-20th century. They knew only the Latin version. Scholars traced this to the 13th century and a Mozarabic environment, but did not connect it to the Kitāb. Thomas Burman produced a Latin edition and English translation in 1994. The scholarly consensus at the time of Burman's edition was that the Liber was composed in Arabic by a Mozarab in or around Toledo. Although it was recognized that internal evidence suggested it was composed shortly after 1009, scholars preferred a date after the conquest of Toledo by Castile in 1085, when a Christian would feel more free to openly criticize Islam. Burman placed the composition between about 1050 and 1132, Micheline Di Cesare between 1085 and 1132.

David Bertaina first identified the Liber as a translation of the Kitāb in 2019. He published an Arabic edition and English translation in 2021.

== Reception ==
=== Original audience ===
Ibn Rajāʾ's intended audience seems to have included both Christians and Muslims. He occasionally instructs Christian readers on how to respond to Muslim critics. At times he refers to Muslims as "them", while other times he addresses them directly as "you". His introduction includes a divine invocation for the conversion of his Muslim readers: "May God guide you to His obedience just as He guided us, and show you the way of truth just as He showed us, and guide you to His religion, which He chose for Himself, just as He guided us".

Ibn Rajāʾ may have been familiar with Christian–Muslim debates from his father's proximity to the Fāṭimid court, where such debates are known to have taken place. His citation of ḥadīth suggests that both Sunnī and Ismāʿīlī Muslims were among his target audience.

=== Influence ===
The Kitāb was one of the most influential works on Islam in Western Europe in the later Middle Ages. It was known to Ramon Martí (d. 1284), who may have used the Arabic version for his Explanatio simboli apostolorum and De seta Machometi. In his Liber de fine Ramon Llull (d. 1316) also used the Arabic text, which he proposed giving to Muslim captives to read. Llull also shows knowledge of the Latin text in his Llibre de la doctrina pueril. It may have been one of the sources of the Book of Muḥammad's Ladder, a mid-13th-century composite work from the circle of Alfonso X, available in Spanish, French and Latin. The greatest user of the Liber denudationis, however, was Riccoldo da Monte di Croce (d. 1320), who uses material from it, sometimes verbatim, in 51 instances in his Contra legem Sarracenorum and Itinerarium. The former treatise was the major vector for its influence, since it was translated into Greek by Demetrios Kydones (d. 1398), whence back into Latin and thence into German at the urging of Martin Luther.

The influence of the Kitāb stemmed from its citation of Islamic sources and its basic accuracy. It was less used in the Middle East. It was clearly used by Bar Hebraeus (d. 1286) in his Syriac Book of Rays, although he does not cite it. It has even been cited in a modern edition of a Shīʿī text, based on a manuscript once owned by Marʿashi al-Najafī. How the Arabic Kitāb became known to a modern Shīʿī scholar is unclear.

== See also ==
- Arabic Apocalypse of Peter

== Bibliography ==
- Bertaina, David (2014a). "A Medieval Coptic Convert's Analysis of Islam: The Kitāb al-Wāḍiḥ bi-l-ḥaqq of Būluṣ ibn Rağāʾ". Parole de l'Orient. 39: 181–201. ISSN 0258-8331.
- Bertaina, David (2014b). "Ḥadīth in the Christian Arabic Kalām of Būluṣ Ibn Rajāʾ (c. 1000)". Intellectual History of the Islamicate World. 2 (1–2): 267–286. doi:10.1163/2212943X-00201016.
- Bertaina, David (2018). "Būluṣ ibn Rajāʾ on the History and Integrity of the Qurʾan: Copto-Islamic Controversy in Fatimid Cairo". In Mark Beaumont (ed.). Arab Christians and the Qurʾan from the Origins of Islam to the Medieval Period. Brill. pp. 174–195. doi:10.1163/9789004360747_010. ISBN 9789004360747.
- Bertaina, David (2020). "The Arabic Version of the Liber Denudationis: How Fāṭimid Controversies Shaped Medieval European Views of Islam". Islam and Christian–Muslim Relations. 31 (4): 425–443. doi:10.1080/09596410.2021.1872925. S2CID 231741701.
- Bertaina, David (2021). Būluṣ ibn Rajāʾ: The Fatimid Egyptian Convert Who Shaped Christian Views of Islam. Brill. ISBN 9789004517394.
- Burman, Thomas E. (1991a). Spain's Arab Christians and Islam, c. 1050–1200: The Text of the "Liber denudationis" (alias "Contrarietas alfolica") and Its Intellectual Milieu (PhD dissertation). University of Toronto. ProQuest NN69396
- Burman, Thomas E. (1991b). "The Influence of the Apology of Al-Kindī and Contrarietas alfolica on Ramon Lull's Late Religious Polemics, 1305–1313". Mediaeval Studies. 53: 197–228. doi:10.1484/J.MS.2.306386.
- Burman, Thomas E. (1994). Religious Polemic and the Intellectual History of the Mozarabs, c. 1050–1250. Brill.
- Burman, Thomas E. (2011). "Liber denudationis". In David Thomas; Alex Mallett (eds.). Christian–Muslim Relations: A Bibliographical History. Vol. 3 (1050–1200). Brill. pp. 414–417.
- Di Cesare, Michelina (2012). The Pseudo-Historical Image of the Prophet Muhammad in Medieval Latin Literature: A Repertory. De Gruyter.
- Echevarría, Ana (2005). "Eschatology or Biography? Alfonso X, Muhammad's Ladder and a Jewish Go-Between". In Leyla Rouhi; Cynthia Robinson (eds.). Under the Influence: Questioning the Comparative in Medieval Castile. Brill. pp. 133–152.
- Frederick, Vincent (1991). "Wadih Ibn Raja', Al-". In Aziz Suryal Atiya (ed.). The Coptic Encyclopedia. Vol. 7. New York: Macmillan Publishers. col. 2311a.
- Lohr, Charles (1968). "Ramon Lull, Liber Alquindi and Liber Telif" (PDF). Estudios Lulianos. 12. Escuela Lulística Mayoricense: 145–160. Archived (PDF) from the original on December 4, 2022 – via Biblioteca Digital de les Illes Balears.
- Swanson, Mark N. (2010). "Būluṣ ibn Rajāʾ". In David Thomas; Alex Mallett (eds.). Christian–Muslim Relations: A Bibliographical History. Vol. 2 (900–1050). Brill. pp. 541–546. doi:10.1163/9789004216181. hdl:2078/ebook:110090. ISBN 9789004216181.
