= Joseph Morgan (historian) =

British historical compiler (fl. 1739)

Joseph Morgan (fl. 1739) was a British historical compiler.

== Works ==
Morgan edited a periodical Phoenix Britannicus, being a miscellaneous Collection of scarce and curious Tracts… interspersed with choice pieces from original MSS., from January 1732. It ran for six numbers, republished in one volume, with dedication to Charles Lennox, 2nd Duke of Richmond. Other works included:

- Mahometism Fully Explained (1723).
- Mahometism Explained (1725). These two were in part based on a manuscript of 1603 by Muḥammad Rabadán of Aragon.
- The History of Algiers (1728–9).
- A Compleat History of the Present Seat of War in Africa, between the Spaniards and Algerines (1732).
- The Lives and Memorable Actions of many Illustrious Persons of the Eastern Nations (1739), based partly on papers of George Sale.

He also made some translations from French and Dutch.

== Notes ==
Attribution

This article incorporates text from a publication now in the public domain: Lee, Sidney, ed. (1894). "Morgan, J.". Dictionary of National Biography. Vol. 39. London: Smith, Elder & Co.
