= Abu al-Hasan Bakri =

A 16th-century aljamiado copy of Bakrī's Anwār

Abū al-Ḥasan Bakrī (Note: His full name is given as Abū al-Ḥasan Aḥmad ibn ʿAbd Allāh ibn Muḥammad al-Bakrī in Rosenthal 1960 and Shoshan 1993, p. 35. His kunya is Abū al-Ḥasan (or Abū ʾl-Ḥasan), meaning "father of (al-)Ḥasan"; his ism or given name is Aḥmad; his nasab or patronymic is ibn ʿAbd Allāh ibn Muḥammad; and his nisba or tribal name is (al-)Bakrī, indicating the Banū Bakr.) is the purported author of several Islamic works in Arabic, most notably a biography of Muḥammad entitled Kitāb al-anwār ('Book of Lights'). There is no consensus regarding his historicity (whether he lived) or his floruit (when he lived).

== Life ==
Franz Rosenthal, Boaz Shoshan and Frederick Colby all accept that Bakrī existed, at least as a working hypothesis. The question of his existence is unresolved because many of the works attributed to him remain unpublished and unanalyzed. The main competing eras for Bakrī's life are the ninth and thirteenth centuries AD.

The earliest Islamic biographical dictionary to have an entry on Bakrī is that of al-Dhahabī, who died in 1348. The Anwār cites authors who wrote in the second half of the 13th century, and there is a dated manuscript of the work from 1295. Accepting that Bakrī was the final compiler or rāwī (transmitter) of the Anwār, Rosenthal argued that he wrote in the late thirteenth century. On the other hand, there is a citation to a certain Abū al-Ḥasan ʿAbd Allāh al-Bakrī in the Kitāb badʿ al-khalq wa-qiṣaṣ al-anbiyāʾ of ʿUmāra ibn Wathīma, who died in 902. This passage appears to be drawn from the Anwār. Boaz Shoshan argues that the historical Bakrī lived in the ninth century and wrote the Anwār, which was later expanded by others, a position earlier argued by Giorgio Levi della Vida. Other later works are misattributed to him. Shoshan rejects the view that Bakrī is a mere "literary invention" of the later Middle Ages.

Little is known of Bakrī, which may explain his absence from early dictionaries. He may have been from or active in Baṣra, since he is sometimes called the "Baṣran preacher". Ibn Taymiyya calls him an Ashʿarī.

== Writings ==
=== List of works ===
Six works are attributed to Bakrī by al-Dhahabī:

- Ḍiyāʾ al-anwār, called al-Dharwa fīʾ l-sīra al-nabawiyya by Ibn Ḥajar al-ʿAsqalānī, the biography of Muḥammad
- Raʾs al-ghūl, also called Futūḥ al-Yaman al-maʿrūf bi-raʾs al-ghūl
- Sharr al-dahr
- Kitāb Kalandaja
- Ḥiṣn al-dawlab
- Kitāb al-ḥuṣūn al-sabʿa wa-ṣāḥibihā Haḍḍām ibn alHajjaf wa-ḥurūb al-imām ʿAlī maʿahu, probably the same as the work known as Qiṣṣat sayr al-imām ʿAlī ibn Abī Ṭālib wa-muḥārabatihi al-malik al-Haḍḍām ibn al-Hajjaf wa-qatlihi al-ḥuṣūn al-sabʿa

At least thirty more are known from various archives. These are mostly fictional novelesque treatments of the early Muslim conquests, that is, maghāzī, although a mawlid (poem in praise of Muḥammad) is also attributed to him. Not all of these attributions to him are genuine.

=== Kitāb al-anwār ===
Start of the Latin version of the Anwār from a 12th-century manuscript

The Arabic Kitāb al-anwār survives in over a dozen manuscript, mostly from the seventeenth and eighteenth centuries. The earliest copy was made in Dénia in 1295 and is now shelfmark Borg. ar. 125 (Note: A scan of this manuscript is available online: MS Borg. ar. 125.) in the Vatican Library. Part of the Anwār, or else one of its source texts, was translated into Latin in 1142–1143 by Herman of Carinthia under the title Liber de generatione Mahumet et nutritura eius ('Book of Muḥammad's Genealogy and his Nurturing'), as part of the project now known as the Corpus Islamolatinum sponsored by the Abbey of Cluny. The Latin version survives in at least 23 manuscripts of the twelfth to sixteenth centuries. Hermann worked in the city of León. The Anwār also circulated in Spain in aljamiado form, that is, translated into Andalusi Romance and written in Arabic script, under the title El Libro de las luces. It is known from at least five manuscripts.

The Anwār is an account of the genealogy of Muḥammad and of his early life down to the start of his mabʿath (mission). A major element is the nūr Muḥammadī, Muḥammad's special light or essence, which is primordial and transmitted from Adam to him. Although this doctrine was accepted by Sunnīs, it played a much larger role in Shīʿism. The Anwār describes the creation of the light by Gabriel through the mixing of a white substance (qabḍa bayḍāʾ) with dust from the ground where Muḥammad's grave will lie. It was then washed in Tasnīm and the other springs of Paradise before being deposited in Adam.

The Anwār was written for a popular audience, includes many myths and legends and diverges in many ways from more traditional accounts. It includes an account of the Ethiopian siege of Mecca. The earliest surviving version (from 1295) ends with Muḥammad entering the service of Khadīja, while the fuller early modern editions end with their marriage.

=== Reception ===
Works attributed to Bakrī were popular, but Islamic scholars had a low opinion of him. According to al-Dhahabī, he was a "liar and swindler" and "inventor of stories", but popular in the bookshops of Damascus. Subsequent scholars are equally scathing in their assessments. Writing a little later in the same century, Ibn Kathīr, compares the Sīrat al-Bakrī (i.e., the Kitāb al-anwār) to the popular romances (sīra shaʿbiyya), such as Sīrat Dhīʾl-himma waʾl-Baṭṭāl, Sīrat ʿAntar and Sīrat al-Danif. He describe's Bakrī's "lies" as "an offence and a grave sin". Al-Ṣafadī, who died in 1363, refers to his "unsurpassed lies". In the fifteenth century, al-ʿAsqalānī wrote that "there is not even one accurate description of a single one of Muḥammad's expeditions" in Bakrī's works. They are also condemned by Sibṭ ibn al-ʿAjamī and al-Qalqashandī, who considered him an archetypal liar. In the sixteenth century, Ibn Ḥajar al-Haytamī issued a fatwā forbidding their reading.

== Bibliography ==
- Colby, Frederick S. (2008). Narrating Muḥammad's Night Journey: Tracing the Development of the Ibn ʿAbbās Ascension Discourse. State University of New York.
- De la Cruz Palma, Óscar (2011). "Notas a la lectura del Liber de generatione Mahumet (trad. de Hermán de Carintia, 1142–1143)". In J. Martínez Gázquez; Ó. de la Cruz Palma; C. Ferrero Hernández (eds.). Estudios de latín medieval hispánico. SISMEL. pp. 609–625. Preprint online.
- De la Cruz Palma, Óscar; Ferrero Hernández, Cándida (2011). "Hermann of Carinthia". In David Thomas; Alex Mallett; Juan Pedro Monferrer Sala; Johannes Pahlitzsch; Mark Swanson; Herman Teule; John Tolan (eds.). Christian–Muslim Relations: A Bibliographical History. Vol. 3 (1050–1200). Leiden: Brill. pp. 497–507.
- Di Cesare, Michelina (2012). The Pseudo-Historical Image of the Prophet Muhammad in Medieval Latin Literature: A Repertory. De Gruyter.
- Fierro, Maribel (2011–2013). "El Kitāb al-anwār y la circulación de libros en al-Andalus". Sharq al-Andalus. 20: 97–108.
- Fierro, Maribel (2016). "How Do We Know about the Circulation of Books in al-Andalus? The Case of al-Bakrī's Kitāb al-Anwār". Intellectual History of the Islamicate World. 4: 152–169. doi:10.1163/2212943X-00401009. hdl:10261/193376.
- Lugo Acevedo, María Luisa (2008). El Libro de las luces: leyenda aljamiada sobre la genealogía de Mahoma. SIAL Ediciones.
- Lugo Acevedo, María Luisa (2010). "El libro de las luces" (PDF). In Alfredo Mateos Paramio (ed.). Memoria de los Moriscos: Escritos y relatos de una diáspora cultural. Sociedad Estatal de Conmemoraciones Culturales. pp. 206–208.
- Norris, Harry T. (1988). "The Rediscovery of the Ancient Sagas of the Banū Hilāl". Bulletin of the School of Oriental and African Studies. 51 (3): 462–481.
- Rosenthal, Franz (1960). "al-Bakrī, Abū ʾl-Ḥasan Aḥmad b. ʿAbd Allāh b. Muḥammad". In Gibb, H. A. R.; Kramers, J. H.; Lévi-Provençal, E.; Schacht, J.; Lewis, B. & Pellat, Ch. (eds.). The Encyclopaedia of Islam, Second Edition. Volume I: A–B. Leiden: E. J. Brill. pp. 964–965. OCLC 495469456.
- Rosenthal, Franz (1968). A History of Muslim Historiography (2nd ed.). E. J. Brill.
- Shoshan, Boaz (1993). Popular Culture in Medieval Cairo. Cambridge University Press.
