= Abd as-Salam al-Qadiri =

- Born: Abu Mohammed Abd as-Salam al-Qadiri; 1648
- Died: 1698 (aged 49–50)
- Occupation(s): Historian, genealogist, writer
- Relatives: Mohammed al-Qadiri (grandson)

Abu Mohammed Abd as-Salam al-Qadiri (Arabic: عبد السلام بن الطيب القادري الحسني; 1648–1698) was a historian and genealogist of the Sharifian families of Morocco. He was the grandfather and precursor of the historian Mohammed al-Qadiri (1713–80). He wrote a book about Ahmad ibn Abdullah al-Ma'n al-Andalusi, entitled Al-Maksad al-ahmad fi l-tarif bi-Sayyidina Ibn Abd Allah. He was an expert in the field of lexicography, logic, rhetoric, and hadith.
