= Ibrahim ibn Wasif Shah =

Obscure Muslim writer from the 12th century

Ibrāhīm ibn Waṣīf Shāh
- Died: c. 1202
- Occupation: Historian
- Writing career
- Years active: 12th century CE
- Notable work: Mukhtaṣar ʻajāʼib al-dunyā

Ibrāhīm ibn Waṣīf Shāh (Arabic: ابراهيم بن وصيف شاه) also called Ibn Waṣīf al-Ṣābiʾ and romanized as Alguazif was an obscure Muslim writer who lived around the twelfth century. He wrote on topics relating to the history of Egypt from ancient times to Islamic rule. A manuscript of one of his books, the Ajā’ib al-Dunyā ("Wonders of the World"), is currently stored in the British Museum.

Ibn Wasif Shah wrote detailed descriptions of the pyramids of Egypt while relating myths and legends regarding the foundation and origins of them. He also wrote about the history of the ancient Nubian people and their civilization. The medieval Arab historian Al-Maqrizi quoted extensively from him in his encyclopedic work Kitāb al-Mawāʿiẓ wa-al-iʿtibār. Ibn Wasif Shah is also believed to be the writer of the Akhbar al-Zaman, a manuscript of unknown authorship that has been dated to the tenth century. Some of his works have also been cited in the General Estoria by Alfonso X of Castile, under the name Alguazif.

== Works ==
- Qisas wa ʿajaʾib Miṣr ("Stories and Wonders of Egypt"). A book on the legends and mythology surrounding Egypt in the eye of Arabic tradition, that was quoted by Al-Maqrizi in his Kitāb al-Mawāʿiẓ. This book does not exist anymore and only fragments of it exist in the form of quotations from the writings of Al-Maqrizi.
- Mukhtaṣar ʻajāʼib al-dunyā ("The Abridged Wonders of the World"). A history and geography book that discusses the history of the various wonders of the world, such as the pyramids of Egypt. This book was republished in Beirut by printing press Dār al-Kutub al-ʻIlmīyah‘ in 2001. One of its original manuscripts is preserved in the private collection of the British Museum.

== See also ==
- List of Muslim historians
