= Umara ibn Wathima =

Abū Rifāʿa ʿUmāra ibn Wathīma ibn Mūsā ibn al-Furāt al-Fārisī (died 4 June 902) was a Muslim historian from Egypt. Born in Fusṭāṭ, he was a son of the historian and silk trader Wathīma ibn Mūsā, a native of Fasā in Persia. The year of his birth is unknown, but his father died in 851.

== Works ==
ʿUmāra wrote at least two works in Arabic. His only surviving work is what was, before the discovery of Abū Ḥudhayfa Isḥāq ibn Bishr Qurashī's Mubtadaʾ al-dunyā wa-qiṣaṣ al-anbiyāʾ, thought to be the oldest surviving book of the qiṣaṣ al-anbiyāʾ genre. Entitled Kitāb badʾ al-khalq wa-qiṣaṣ al-anbiyāʾ ('Book of the Beginnings of Creation and the Stories of the Prophets'), it is a collection of didactic stories of those considered prophets in Islam. It is the earliest source to cite the enigmatic Abū al-Ḥasan al-Bakrī. It was itself never widely cited. Of its original two volumes, only the second survives, covering prophets from Moses to Jesus, in two manuscripts. There is a modern French translation by R. G. Khoury. It has been argued that the real author of the Badʾ al-khalq is Wathīma, who was much more prominent than his son.

According to Ibn al-Jawzī, ʿUmāra also wrote an Annalistic History.

== Bibliography ==
- Blatherwick, Helen (2016). Prophets, Gods and Kings in Sīrat Sayf ibn Dhī Yazan: An Intertextual Reading of an Egyptian Popular Epic. Brill.
- Brinner, William M., ed. (2002). ʿArāʾis Al-Majālis Fī Qiṣaṣ al-Anbiyāʾ or "Lives of the Prophets" as Recounted by Abū Isḥāq Aḥmad ibn Muḥammad ibn Ibrāhīm al-Thaʿlabī. Brill.
- Khoury, Raif Georges, ed. (1978). Les légendes prophétiques dans l'islam depuis le I^{er} jusqu'au III^{e} siècle de l'Hégire. Otto Harrassowitz.
- Khoury, Raif Georges (2000). "ʿUmāra b. Wat̲h̲īma". In Bearman, P. J.; Bianquis, Th.; Bosworth, C. E.; van Donzel, E. & Heinrichs, W. P. (eds.). The Encyclopaedia of Islam, Second Edition. Volume X: T–U. Leiden: E. J. Brill. pp. 835–836. ISBN 978-90-04-11211-7.
- Khoury, Raif Georges (2002). "Wat̲h̲īma b. Mūsā". In Bearman, P. J.; Bianquis, Th.; Bosworth, C. E.; van Donzel, E. & Heinrichs, W. P. (eds.). The Encyclopaedia of Islam, Second Edition. Volume XI: W–Z. Leiden: E. J. Brill. pp. 179–180. ISBN 978-90-04-12756-2.
- Rosenthal, Franz (1968). A History of Muslim Historiography (2nd ed.). E. J. Brill.
- Shoshan, Boaz (1993). Popular Culture in Medieval Cairo. Cambridge University Press.
- Tottoli, Roberto (1998). "The Qiṣaṣ al-anbiyāʾ of Ibn Muṭarrif al-Ṭarafī (d. 454/1062): Stories of the Prophets from al-Andalus". Al-Qantara. 19 (1): 131–160.
