= Journal of Ancient Judaism =

- Discipline: Judaism studies
- Language: English
- Edited by: Angela Kim Harkins; Jonathan Klawans

Publication details
- History: 2010–present
- Publisher: Brill Publishers
- Frequency: Triannually

Standard abbreviations
- ISO 4: J. Anc. Jud.

Indexing
- ISSN: 1869-3296 (print); 2196-7954 (web)

Links
- Journal homepage

The Journal of Ancient Judaism is a peer-reviewed academic journal established in 2010. It covers "Jewish literature, culture, religion, and history from the Babylonian exile until the Babylonian Talmud." It is published three times a year by Brill. The editors-in-chief are Angela Kim Harkins and Jonathan Klawans.

The journal is abstracted and indexed in Scopus.
