= Riccoldo da Monte di Croce =

Italian Dominican friar, travel writer and missionary

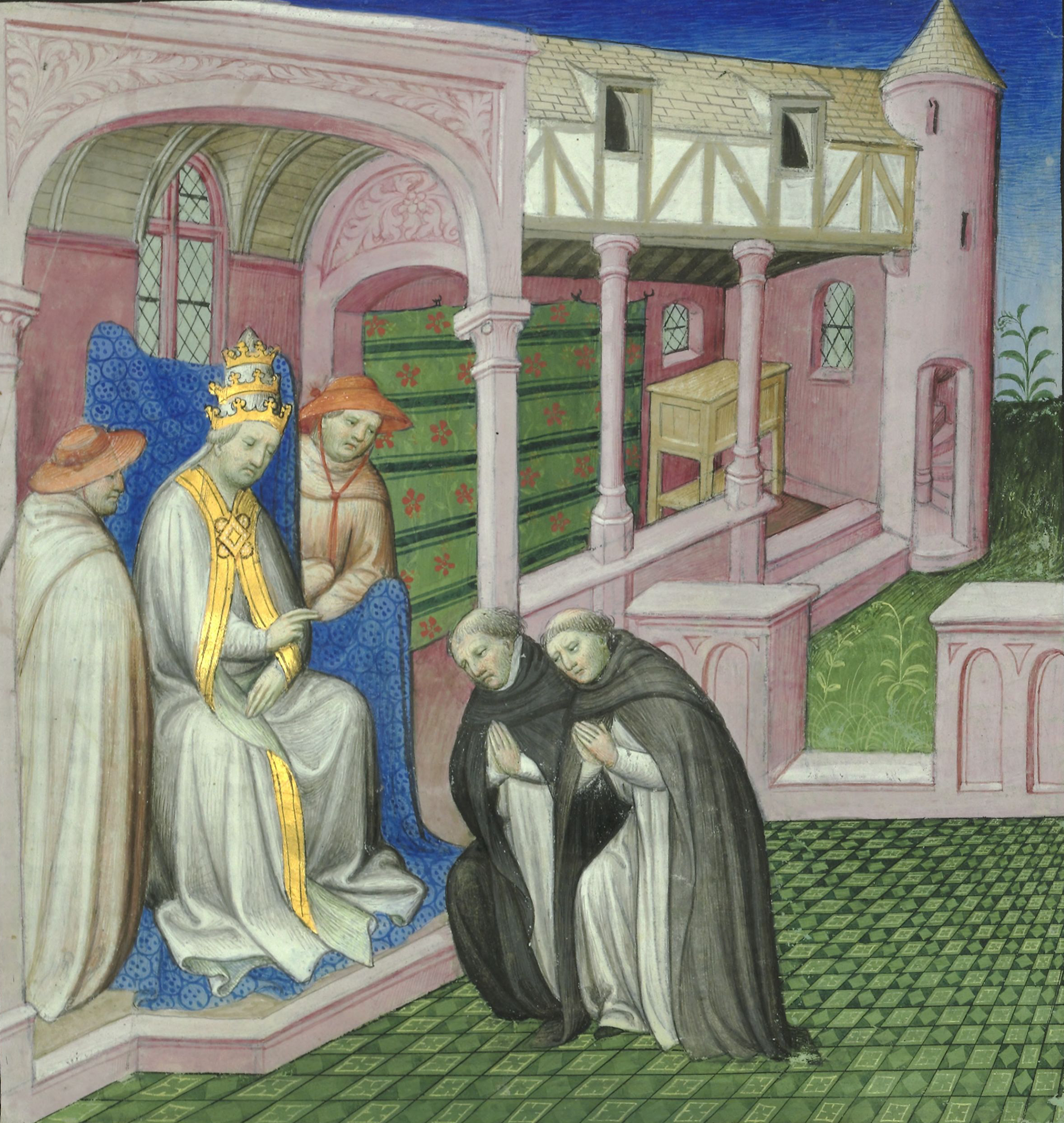
Riccoldo da Monte di Croce and Pope Nicolas IV

Riccoldo da Monte di Croce (Florence; c. 1243–1320) or Ricold of Monte Croce (Latin: Ricoldus de Monte Crucis) was an Italian Dominican friar, travel writer, missionary, and Christian apologist. He is most famous for his polemical works on Medieval Islam and the account of his missionary travels to Baghdad.

== Life ==
Riccoldo was born in Florence, and his family name originated from a small castle just above Pontassieve. As he is sometimes referenced as "Pennini", his father was presumably named Pennino. After studying in various major European schools, he became a Dominican in 1267, entering the house of Santa Maria Novella. He was a professor in several convents of Tuscany, including St Catherine in Pisa (1272–99). With a papal commission to preach he departed for Acre (Antiochia Ptolemais) in 1286 or 1287 and made a pilgrimage to the Holy Land (1288) and then travelled for many years as a missionary in western Asia. He arrived in Mossul in 1289, equipped with a papal bull. He failed to convince the Nestorian Christian mayor of the city to convert to Catholicism. He was a missionary to the court of the Mongol Il-Khan ruler Arghun, of whom he wrote that he was "a man given to the worst of villainy, but for all that a friend of the Christians".

Moving to Baghdad, Riccoldo entered in conflict with the local Nestorian Christians, preaching against them in their own cathedral. He was allowed nonetheless by Mongol authorities to build his own church, with the interdiction to preach in public. Riccoldo brought the matter to the Nestorian patriarch Yahballaha III, who agreed with him that the doctrine of Nestorius, namely the duality of Christ (thus achieving a theoretical fusion of the Latin Church and the Church of the East) was heretical. Yahballaha was however disavowed by his own followers.

He returned to Florence before 1302, and was chosen to high offices in his order. He died in Florence on 31 October 1320.

== Works ==
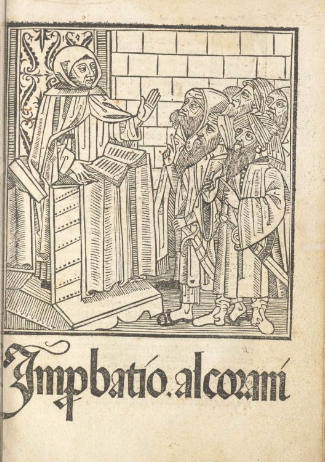
Title page of Riccoldo's work published in Seville c.1500, showing a Christian friar preaching to Muslims

=== Travels ===
His Book of Travels (Latin: Liber Peregrinacionis) or Itinerary (Itinerarius), written about 1288–91, was intended as a guide-book for missionaries, and is a description of the Oriental countries he visited.

In 1288 or 1289 he began to keep a record of his experiences in the Levant; this record he probably reduced to final book form in Baghdad. Entering Syria at Acre, he crossed Galilee to the Sea of Tiberias; thence returning to Acre he seems to have travelled down the coast to Jaffa, and so up to Jerusalem. After visiting the Jordan River and the Dead Sea he left Palestine by the coast road, retracing his steps to Acre and passing on by Tripoli and Tortosa into Cilicia. From the Cilician port of Lajazzo (now Yumurtalik in Turkey) he started on the great high road to Tabriz in north Persia. Crossing the Taurus he travelled on by Sivas of Cappadocia to Erzerum, the neighborhood of Ararat and Tabriz. In and near Tabriz he preached for several months, after which he proceeded to Baghdad via Mosul and Tikrit. In Baghdad he stayed several years.

His travel writings are considered a significant record of the regions he visited. His descriptions of the Tatars and his account of Islamic religion and customs are frequently cited by scholars. Although his writing reflects the prejudices of his era, modern historians have noted that his observations often display a degree of objectivity and openness toward cultures and belief systems different from his own.

=== On the Fall of Acre ===
His Letters on the Fall of Acre (Latin: Epistolæ de Perditione Acconis) are five letters in the form of lamentations over the fall of Acre (written about 1292, published in Paris, 1884).

And so it came to pass that I was in Baghdad, “among the captives by the river of Chebar” [Ezek. 1:1], the Tigris. This garden of delights in which I found myself enthralled me, for it was like a paradise in its abundance of trees, its fertility, its many fruits. This garden was watered by the rivers of Paradise, and the inhabitants built gilt houses all around it. Yet I was saddened by the massacre and capture of the Christian people. I wept over the loss of Acre, seeing the Saracens joyous and prospering, the Christians squalid and consternated: little children, young girls, old people, whimpering, threatened to be led as captives and slaves into the remotest countries of the East, among barbarous nations.

Suddenly, in this sadness, swept up into an unaccustomed astonishment, I began, stupefied, to ponder God's judgment concerning the government of the world, especially concerning the Saracens and the Christians. What could be the cause of such massacre and such degradation of the Christian people? Of so much worldly prosperity for the perfidious Saracen people? Since I could not simply be amazed, nor could I find a solution to this problem, I decided to write to God and his celestial court, to express the cause of my astonishment, to open my desire through prayer, so that God might confirm me in the truth and sincerity of the Faith, that he quickly put an end to the law, or rather the perfidy, of the Saracens, and more than anything else that he liberate the Christian captives from the hands of the enemies.

Epistolae V de perditione Acconis (1291), quoted in Tolan 2002, p. xiii

=== Apologetic writings against Islam and Judaism ===
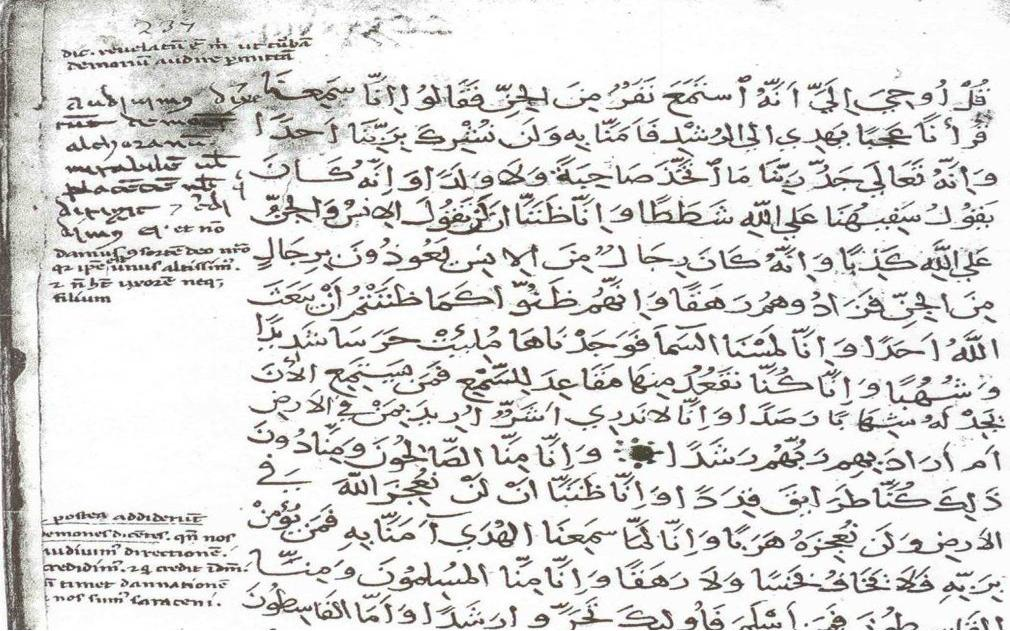
Bibliothèque nationale de France MS ar. 384, the Arabic manuscript of the Qur'an read by Riccoldo while he was writing his book Contra legem Saracenorum, with Riccoldo's annotations in Latin

During his stay in Baghdad, Riccoldo studied the Qur'an and other works of Islamic theology for controversial purposes, arguing with Nestorian Christians, and writing. In 1300–1301 Riccoldo again appeared in Florence. About 1300 in Florence he wrote Against the Laws of the Saracens (Latin: Contra Legem Sarracenorum) and To the Eastern Races (Ad Nationes Orientales).

Riccoldo's best known work of this kind was his book Against the Laws of the Saracens, written in Baghdad, which has in previous centuries been very popular among Christians as a polemical source against Islam, and has been often edited (first published in Seville, 1500, under the title Confutatio Alcorani or "Confutation of the Koran"). This work was translated into German by Martin Luther in 1542 as Verlegung des Alcoran. There are translations into English by Thomas C. Pfotenhauer (Islam in the Crucible: Can It Pass the Test?, Lutheran News, Inc., 2002), and Londini Ensis, under the title, "Refutation of the Koran" (Createspace 2010).

Much of this work's contents derive from those sections of the Book of Travels devoted to Muslim beliefs and related topics. One of Riccoldo's major sources, extensively quoted in his own work, is the anonymous Liber Denudationis siue Ostensionis aut Patefaciens. Despite Riccoldo's hostility towards Islam, his work shows specific knowledge of the Qur'an and overcomes one important prejudicial error common to other Medieval criticisms of Islam: the view of Muhammad as an introducer of a Christological heresy.

The Christianæ Fidei Confessio facta Sarracenis (printed in Basel, 1543) is attributed to Riccoldo, and was probably written about the same time as the above-mentioned works. Other works are: Against the Errors of the Jews (Contra Errores Judaeorum); Against the Eastern Races (Libellus contra Nationes Orientales; MSS. at Florence and Paris); Against the Saracens and Quran (Contra Sarracenos et Alcoranum; MS. at Paris); and On Different Religions (De Variis Religionibus; MS. at Turin). Very probably the last three works were written after his return to Europe; the last has a title similar to the last chapter of the Travels (De Variis Religionibus Terre Sancte). Riccoldo is also known to have written two theological works—a defence of the doctrines of Thomas Aquinas (in collaboration with John of Pistoia, about 1285) and a commentary on the Libri Sententiarum (before 1288). Riccoldo began a Latin translation of the Quran about 1290, but it is not known whether this work was completed.
