= Muhammad Rabadán =

Muḥammad Rabadán (fl. c. 1600) was an Aragonese Morisco, noted for writing Discurso de la luz de Muhamad ('discourse of the light of Muḥammad'), the principal Spanish-language Muslim account of the lives of the Islamic prophets.

== Discurso de la luz de Muhamad ==
Rabadán's Discurso de la luz de Muhamad begins with a canto praising God as the creator of all; the second canto tells of Adam, Iblīs, Noah and Abraham. Subsequent cantos recount the lives of all the Jewish prophets as far as Jesus (including Jesus himself), and Arab prophets as far as Muḥammad. The life Muḥammad himself is told across five cantos, concluding with his death. The work closes by listing the ninety-nine names of Allāh, explaining each in Spanish. The text was a major influence on the understanding of Islam of the eighteenth-century English historian Joseph Morgan.

== Other works ==
Rabadán has been identified as the author of a sixteenth-century Spanish poem recounting a hajj, "Coplas del peregrino de Puey Monçón". Twenty-first-century scholarship regarded the attribution as unlikely, however.

== Editions ==
- The Poetry of Mohamed Rabadan of Arragon, ed. by H. E. J. Stanley (Brentford: Austin, 1867).
