= Abū Naṣr Aḥmad ibn Muḥammad al-Bukhārī =

Islamic scholar (11th century)

- Known for: Tāj al-qiṣaṣ

Abū Naṣr Aḥmad ibn Muḥammad al-Bukhārī, is known for writing the Persian-language Tāj al-qiṣaṣ around 475 AH (1082–83 CE) at Balkh.

This was an extensive, Islamic account of the lives of the Prophets, beginning with Adam and concluding with Muḥammad. Into this work al-Bukhārī also incorporated his Anīs al-murīdīn wa-rauḍat al-muḥibbīn, a commentary on the Qur'an's sūrat Yūsuf.

== Editions ==
- Abū Naṣr Aḥmad ibn Muḥammad ibn Naṣr Bukhārī Urfanjī, تاج القصص [Tāj al-qiṣaṣ], 2 vols (تهران: فرهنگستان زبان و ادب فارسى [Tehran: Farhangistān-i Zabān va Adab-i Fārsī], 2007).
