= Al-Fakihi =

9th-century Arab Historian and Hadith scholar

Al-Fakihi Abu 'Abd Allah Muhammad ibn Ishaq ibn al-'Abbas al-Fakihi
- أبو عبد الله محمد بن إسحاق بن العباس الفاكهي

Personal life
- Born: 215–220 AH
- Died: 272–279 AH
- Era: Islamic Golden Age (Abbasid era)
- Region: Abbasid Caliphate
- Main interest: Islamic History
- Occupation: Arab historian

Religious life
- Religion: Islam
- Creed: Sunni

Abu 'Abd Allah Muhammad ibn Ishaq ibn al-'Abbas al-Fakihi (Arabic: أبو عبد الله محمد بن إسحاق بن العباس الفاكهي, born 215–220 AH; died 272-279 AH) was an eminent 9th-century historian and hadith scholar of Mecca. He narrated hadiths from preeminent hadith scholars such as Muhammad Ibn Ismail al-Bukhari, Muslim ibn al-Hajjaj, Abu Hatim al-Razi and Abu Zur'ah Jurjani.

== Works ==
- Akhbār Makkah fī qadīm al-dahr wa-ḥadīthih (أخبار مكة في قديم الدهر وحديثه): The book, of which only the second half survived to the present day, was praised by Ibn Hajar and Taqi al-Din al-Fasi. A small portion of the work was edited by Ferdinand Wüstenfeld.
