= Ibn Lahi'a =

Arab historian and hadith scholar

- إبن لهيعة
- Born: c. 714/5; Egypt, Umayyad Caliphate
- Died: c. 790; Egypt, Abbasid Caliphate
- Title: Qadi

Academic work
- Era: Islamic Golden Age, Abbasid era
- Main interests: History, qadi, hadith

Abū Abd al-Raḥmān Abdallāh Ibn Lahīʿa ibn ʿUqba ibn Furʿān ibn Rabīʿa ibn Thawbān al-Ḥaḍramī al-Aʿdūlī (Arabic: أبوعبدالرحمن عبدالله بن لهيعة بن عقبة بن فرعان بن ربيعة بن ثوبان الحضرمي الأعدولي) (96–174 AH) (714/5–790 CE) more commonly known as Ibn Lahi'a (إبن لهيعة), was an Arab historian, scholar of hadith and Qadi (قاضي; lit. 'judge') of Egypt. Famed for being the first judge of Egypt to be appointed directly by a caliph.

== Biography ==
Nothing is known about Ibn Lahi'a's early years of his life, except that he was probably born in Egypt in the year 714/5 to a family of Yemeni origin. As a historian and a collector of hadith, Ibn Lahi'a gained fame around Egypt, which at the time was part of the Abbasid Caliphate (750–1258). Due to his great reputation of being a respected learned man among his contemporaries, the Abbasid caliph al-Mansur (r. 754–775) personally appointed him to the position of Qadi of Egypt, which he occupied from 772 to 780. The caliph also issued him a payment of 30 dinars per month as a salary. He died in the year 790. According to the massive encyclopedic work Siyar A'lam al-Nubala' (سير أعلام النبلاء; lit. 'The Lives of Noble Figures') of Al-Dhahabi (d. 1348), Ibn Lahia's library and the books within, were burned in a fire which occurred in the year 786.

== Assessment ==
According to the historian Pavel Pavlovich, Ibn Lahi'a is among "the most disparaged second-[Islamic] century traditionists". The 9th-century historian Ibn Sa'd considered him a da'if ('weak') authority, while al-Juzajani dismissed traditions emanating from him as "unreliable", invalid for use in legal arguments or for transmission. The basis for much of the Islamic scholarly criticism of Ibn Lahi'a is frequent omission of one to three informants in his isnads (chains of transmission of historical information). The alleged burning of his books in his house fire was dismissed by Yahya ibn Ma'in (d. 847) as the justification for Ibn Lahi'a's omissions.

== See also ==
- List of pre-modern Arab scientists and scholars

== Bibliography ==
- Pavlovitch, Pavel (2016). The Formation of the Islamic Understanding of Kalāla in the Second Century AH (718–816 CE): Between Scripture and Canon. Leiden: Brill. ISBN 978-90-04-30606-6.
