= Mohammed al-Qadiri =

Moroccan historian

- محمد بن الطيب القادري
- Born: Mohammed ibn al-Tayyib al-Qadiri; 1712
- Died: 1773 (aged 60–61)
- Occupations: Historian, writer
- Relatives: Abd as-Salam al-Qadiri (grandfather)

Mohammed ibn al-Tayyib al-Qadiri (Arabic: محمد بن الطيب القادري; 1712–1773) was a Moroccan historian most known as the author of Nashr al-Mathani. This work is a biographical dictionary of 18th-century Morocco, but each year is usually accompanied by a summary of events. In this sense, the form of the book tends toward being both that of a biographical dictionary and a chronicle. Mohammed al-Qadiri is the grandson of the genealogist Abd as-Salam al-Qadiri.

Full title of al-Mathani (The Chronicles): Nashr al-mathani li-ahl al-qarn al-hadi 'ashr wa al-thani, Edited by A. Tawfiq and M. Hijji. 4 vols. Rabat, 1977. Partial English translation by N. Cigar. Muhammad al-Qadiri's Nashr al-mathani: The Chronicles. Oxford: Oxford University Press, 1981.

His extensive autobiography with some references to himself and family is in Iltiqat al-durat (wa-mustafad al-mawaiz wa-al-ibar min akhbar wa-ayan al-mia al-hadiya wa-althaniya ashar), ed. Hashim al-Alawi al-Qasimi (Beirut: Manshurat Dar al-Afaq al- Jadida, 1983) 449-92. He also composed a catalogue of books (Al-Fihrisit), which is unpublished.
