= Bulus ibn Raja' =

Egyptian coptic Christian monk

Būluṣ ibn Rajāʾ (born 950s, died after 1009), nicknamed al-Wāḍiḥ ('the Exposer' or 'Clarifier'), was a Coptic Christian monk, priest and apologist under the Fāṭimid Caliphate. He was a convert from Islam who wrote in Arabic.

== Life ==
Ibn Rajāʾ was born probably in the 950s. His given name at birth was Yūsuf. His full name appears in the sources as al-Wāḍiḥ Yūsuf ibn Rajāʾ, al-Wāḍiḥ ibn Rajāʾ or Būluṣ ibn Rajāʾ. He was born in Cairo, where his father, Rajāʾ al-Shahīd, was a Sunnī jurist at the Shia Fāṭimid court. The name of his mother is unknown. She may have been a Christian, but she was probably not a Copt, since her son grew up ignorant of the Coptic language.

Ibn Rajāʾ studied the Qurʾān, tafsīr (Qurʾānic interpretation), ḥadīth (tradition) and Islamic law. During the reign of the Caliph al-Muʿizz (973–975), he witnessed the execution of a Muslim convert to Christianity in Old Cairo and was moved by his prophetic final words. Later, probably in the 980s, he undertook a pilgrimage to Mecca, but became lost during the return journey. He wound up in the church of Abū Sayfayn, where he converted and was baptised as Būluṣ (Paul).

When his family, who believed him to be lost in the desert, found him in Abū Sayfayn, they brought him home and tried to convince him to return to Islam. Failing in this, his father sent him away. He travelled to the monasteries of the Wādī al-Naṭrūn, where he took vows as a monk. A fellow monk convinced him to publicly declare his conversion in Cairo. This provoked his father to extreme measures to bring him back to Islam. When these failed, he denounced his son to the Caliph al-ʿAzīz Bi'llāh, who appointed the chief judge of Egypt to investigate the case. He received support from notable figures such as the caliph's Christian wife, al-Sayyida al-ʿAzīziyya, and was eventually let go.

Ibn Rajāʾ returned to the Wādī al-Naṭrūn and was ordained a priest. He built a church dedicated to Saint Michael in Raʾs al-Khalīj. His father sent some Bedouin to kill him, but he escaped into the Nile Delta. There he served as steward of the church of Saint Theodore in Sandafā. There he also met Theodore ibn Mīnā, secretary of the Holy Synod. He gave an oral account his life to Theodore, who later passed it on to Michael of Damrū, who in 1051 incorporated Ibn Rajāʾ's biography into his continuation of the History of the Patriarchs of Alexandria under the patriachate of Philotheos (979–1003). Ibn Rajāʾ was still alive in August 1009, since he wrote that 400 years had passed in the Islamic calendar. He was buried in the church in Sandafā.

The Coptic Orthodox Church recognises Ibn Rajāʾas a "holy exemplar". Michael's hagiographical biography, however, refers to him as a "saint" (al-qiddīs). Other medieval sources on Ibn Rajāʾ include Ibn al-Rāhib, Ibn Kabar and Yūsāb of Fuwa. Ibn Kabar claims that he wrote an autobiography, but this may be a mistaken reference to the History of the Patriarchs.

== Works ==
According to the biography in the History of the Patriarchs, Ibn Rajāʾ wrote three works. The last of these is preserved and in it he cites his two earlier works. These two works are not known for certain to be extant, although copies may exist in a private collection in Aleppo.

- Nawādir al-mufassirīn wa-taḥrīf al-mukhālifīn ('Anecdotes of the Commentators', 'The Choice Passages of the Exegetes and the Corruption of the Opponents', 'Rare Points of the Interpreter')
- Kitāb al-ibāna fī tanāquḍ al-ḥadīth ('Demonstration on the Contradiction of the Hadith' 'Disclosing the Contradictions in the Hadith', 'Clarification Concerning the Contradiction of the Hadith'), possibly also called Hatk al-maḥjūb ('The Disclosure of the Veiled', 'Unveiling the Veiled')
- Kitāb al-wāḍiḥ bi-l-ḥaqq ('Clarity in Truth', 'The Truthful Exposer', 'Book of Evidence', 'The Book of al-Wāḍiḥ', or 'The Book of That Which is Clear'), also called al-Iʿtirāf ('The Confession')

The Nawādir and the Kitāb al-ibāna were reported by Paul Sbath in manuscripts now inaccessible to scholars. He describes the former as a refutation of Islam. Its title implies that it cites tafsīr to this end. The title of the second work implies that it points out the contradictions in the ḥadīth corpus. The title Hatk al-maḥjūb is reported by Ibn Kabar.

The Kitāb al-wāḍiḥ was translated into Latin in the 13th century under the title Liber denudationis sive ostensionis aut patefaciens ('Book of Denuding or Exposing, or the Discloser'). It is preserved in whole or in part in four Arabic manuscripts and in one Latin manuscript.

According to both the History of the Patriarchs and his own Kitāb al-wāḍiḥ, Ibn Rajāʾ was a close friend and collaborator of Sāwīrus ibn al-Muqaffaʿ. The two spent much time in discussions on biblical interpretation. They were among the pioneers of Copto-Arabic literature.

== Bibliography ==
- Bertaina, David (2014). "Ḥadīth in the Christian Arabic Kalām of Būluṣ Ibn Rajāʾ (c. 1000)". Intellectual History of the Islamicate World. 2 (1–2): 267–286. doi:10.1163/2212943X-00201016.
- Bertaina, David (2018). "Būluṣ ibn Rajāʾ on the History and Integrity of the Qurʾan: Copto-Islamic Controversy in Fatimid Cairo". In Mark Beaumont (ed.). Arab Christians and the Qurʾan from the Origins of Islam to the Medieval Period. Brill. pp. 174–195. doi:10.1163/9789004360747_010.
- Bertaina, David (2020). "The Arabic Version of the Liber Denudationis: How Fāṭimid Controversies Shaped Medieval European Views of Islam". Islam and Christian–Muslim Relations. 31 (4): 425–443. doi:10.1080/09596410.2021.1872925.
- Bertaina, David (2021). Būluṣ ibn Rajāʾ: The Fatimid Egyptian Convert Who Shaped Christian Views of Islam. Brill.
- Frederick, Vincent (1991). "Wadih Ibn Raja', Al-". In Aziz Suryal Atiya (ed.). The Coptic Encyclopedia. Vol. 7. New York: Macmillan Publishers. col. 2311a.
- Gabra, Gawdat (2009). The A to Z of the Coptic Church. Scarecrow Press.
- Hanna, Sally Adel (2020). Hagiographical Discourse in Medieval Arabic Christianity: A Study of Anthony al-Qurashi and Būlus ibn Raja as a Discourse of Parrhesia (PDF) (Bachelor's thesis). University College Stockholm.
- Swanson, Mark N. (2010a). "Būluṣ ibn Rajāʾ". In David Thomas; Alex Mallett (eds.). Christian–Muslim Relations: A Bibliographical History. Vol. 2 (900–1050). Brill. pp. 541–546.
- Swanson, Mark N. (2010b). The Coptic Papacy in Islamic Egypt (641–1517). American University in Cairo Press.
