= Ibn Qutaybah =

Persian jurist and scholar (c. 828-889)

Abū Muḥammad ʿAbd Allāh ibn Muslim ibn Qutayba al-Dīnawarī al-Marwazī
- أبو محمد عبد الله بن مسلم بن قتيبة الكوفي الدِّينَوَرِيُّ
- Title: Ibn Qutaybah

Personal life
- Born: 213 AH/828 Kufa, Abbasid Caliphate
- Died: 15 Rajab 276AH/13 November, 889
- Era: Islamic golden age
- Region: Abbasid Caliphate
- Main interest(s): politics, history, Tafsir, Hadith, Kalam and Arabic literature
- Notable works: Training of the Secretary; ‘Uyun al-akhbar; Gharīb al-Qur’ān
- Occupation: Scholar of Islam

Religious life
- Religion: Islam
- Denomination: Sunni
- Creed: Athari

Abū Muḥammad ʿAbd Allāh ibn Muslim ibn Qutayba al-Dīnawarī al-Marwazī (Arabic: ابن قتيبة, romanized: Ibn Qutaybah; c. 828 – 13 November 889 CE/213 – 15 Rajab 276 AH), better known as Ibn Qutayba, was a Persian Islamic scholar. He served as a judge during the Abbasid Caliphate, but was prominent for his contributions to Arabic literature. He was an Athari theologian and polymath who wrote on diverse subjects, such as Qur'anic exegesis, hadith, theology, philosophy, law and jurisprudence, grammar, philology, history, astronomy, agriculture and botany.

== Biography ==
His full name is Abū Muḥammad ʿAbdullāh b. Muslim ibn Qutaybah ad-Dīnawarī. He was born in Kufa in what is now Iraq. He was of Persian descent; his father was from Merv, Khorasan. Having studied tradition and philology he became qadi in Dinawar during the reign of Al-Mutawakkil, and afterwards a teacher in Baghdad. He was the first representative of the school of Baghdad philologists that succeeded the schools of Kufa and Basra. He was known as a vocal opponent of "gentile" or shu'ubi Islam, i.e. openness to non-Islamic wisdom and values.

== Legacy ==
He was viewed by Sunni Muslims as a hadith master, foremost philologist, linguist, and man of letters. In addition to his literary criticism and anthologies, he was also known for his work on the problems of Tafsir or Qur'anic interpretation. He also authored works on astronomy and legal theory. His book Uyun al-Akhbar, along with the romantic literature of Muhammad bin Dawud al-Zahiri and Ibn Abi Tahir Tayfur, was considered by lexicographer Ibn Duraid to be the three most important works for those who wished to speak and write eloquently.

There can be no government without an army,
No army without money,
No money without prosperity,
And no prosperity without justice and good administration.

— Ibn Qutaybah on good government.

His work Taʾwīl Mukhtalif al-Hadīth was an influential early Atharite treatise that rebuked rationalists on the nature of tradition. In his treatise, Ibn Qutayba censures the mutakallimūn (scholastic theologians) for holding contradictory and differing views on the principles of religion.

Ibn Muṭarrif al-Ṭarafī (d. 1062 CE) gathered passages from Ibn Qutayba's Kitāb Mushkil al-Qurʾān and Kitāb Ghafīb al-Qurʾān and arranged them to be in the same order as the relevant Qurʾān chapters in a work called Kitāb al-Qurṭayn.

== Works ==
He wrote more than 60 books, including:

- Gharīb al-Qur'an, (var., Mushkil al-Qur'an), lexical complexities in the Qur'an.
- Ta’wīl Mukhtalif al-Hadīth, (The Interpretation of Conflicting Narrations), defence of hadiths against Mu'tazilite critics.
- Kitāb Adab al-Kātib (“Ibn Kutaiba’s Adab al-Kātib,” ed. Max Grünert, Leiden, 1900)
- Kitāb al-Anwā’ (Hyderabad, 1956)
- Kitāb al-Ma‘ānī al-Kabīr fī Abyāt al-Ma‘ānī. 2 vols. (Hyderabad, 1949)
- Kitāb al-Ma’ārif, short universal history, from Creation to the Jāhiliyya (pre-Islamic); with index of the Companions, famous jurists and masters of hadīth („Ibn Coteiba’s Handbuch de Geschichte“, ed., Ferdinand Wüstenfeld, Göttingen, 1850); (ed., Tharwat ‘Ukāshah, Cairo, 1960).
- Kitāb al-Shi‘r wa-al-Shu‘arā’ (“Liber Poësie et Poëtarum,” ed., M. J de Goeje, Leiden, 1904)
- Kitab ‘Uyūn al-Akhbār. 4 vols. (Cairo, 1925-30); biographic history of eminent figures.
- Kitāb al-Amwāl
- Kitāb al-‘Arab wa ‘Ulūmuhā; history of Arab scholars
- Kitāb al-Ashriba; alcoholic beverages.
- Kitāb Dalā’il al-Nubuwwa, or A‘lām al-Nubuwwa on the Proofs of the Prophets.
- Kitāb Fad.l al-‘Arab ‘alā al-‘Ajam, in praise of the Arabs over the Persians; translated into English as The Excellence of the Arabs (NYU Press, 2017)
- Kitāb I‘rāb al-Qur’ān, a philological commentary on the Qur'ān.
- Kitāb al-Ikhtilāf fī al-Lafz wa al-Radd ‘alā al-Jahmiyya wal-Mushabbiha, a refutation of the Allegorizers and Anthropomorphists. (Egypt, several editions)
- Kitāb al-Ishtiqāq
- Kitāb Is.lāh. Ghalat, corrections of Gharīb al-H.adīth by al-Qāsim ibn Salām.
- Kitāb Jāmi‘ al-Fiqh, jurisprudence, dispraised as unreliable by al-Tabarī and Ibn Surayj, as was Ibn Qutayba’s al-Amwāl.
- Kitāb Jāmi‘ al-Nah.w al-Kabīr and Jāmi‘ al-Nah.w al-S.aghīr
- Kitāb al-Jarāthīm, linguistics.
- Kitāb al-Jawābāt al-H.ād.ira.
- Kitāb al-Ma‘ānī al-Kabīr
- Kitāb al-Masā’il wal-Ajwiba. ('The Book of Questions and Answers.')
- Kitāb al-Maysar wal-Qidāh, ('Dice and Lots').
- Kitāb al-Na‘m wal-Bahā’im, cattle and livestock.
- Kitāb al-Nabāt, botany.
- Kitāb al-Qirā’āt, ('The Canonical Readings').
- Kitāb al-Radd ‘alā al-Qā’il bi Khalq al-Qur’ān, ('Against the creationist claims about the Qur’an').
- Kitāb al-Radd ‘alā al-Shu‘aybiyya, ('Refutation of a sub-sect of the ‘Ajārida ‘At.awiyya, itself a sub-sect of the Khawārij).
- Kitāb al-Rah.l wal-Manzil.
- Kitāb Ta‘bīr al-Ru’yā, ('Interpretation of Dreams').
- Kitāb Talqīn al-Muta‘allim min al-Nah.w on grammar.
- Kitāb ‘Uyūn al-Shi‘r, on poetry.

== See also ==
- List of Islamic scholars
- List of Iranian scientists and scholars
- Al-Zahiriyah Library
