= Barbara Schmitz =

German theologian

Barbara Schmitz (born 1975) is a German Roman Catholic theologian. She is Professor of Old Testament Biblical Studies at the Faculty of Catholic Theology at Julius-Maximilians-Universität Würzburg. Her research focuses on Jewish literature from the Hellenistic-Roman period, Septuagint studies, deuterocanonical literature, as well as narratology and the Old Testament.

== Life and academic career ==
Schmitz studied Catholic Theology in Passau, Jerusalem and Münster and, from 2005 to 2009, was a senior lecturer of Old Testament at the University of Duisburg-Essen. After obtaining her PhD at the Faculty of Catholic Theology at the University of Münster (2003) and completing her habilitation at the Faculty of Catholic Theology at the University of Regensburg (2007), she had the interim chair of Exegese und Theologie des Alten Testaments (Exegesis and Theology of the Old Testament) at the Faculty of Human Sciences and Theology at the Technical University of Dortmund in 2009, where she was appointed university professor in 2010.

Since July 2011, Schmitz has been Professor of Old Testament and Biblical-Oriental Languages at the Faculty of Catholic Theology at Julius-Maximilians-Universität Würzburg. Since 2011 she has also been the Women’s Representative of the Faculty of Catholic Theology; from 2011 to 2013 she was Deputy University Women’s Representative of Julius-Maximilians-Universität Würzburg. From 2015 to 2019 she was Vice Dean of the Faculty of Catholic Theology, and since 2021 she has been Senator of Julius-Maximilians-Universität Würzburg.

== Academic distinctions ==
- 2019 Prize for good teaching (Preis für gute Lehre), Bayerisches Staatsministerium für Unterricht und Kultus
- 2003 Promotion Prize for young women scientists, Soroptimist International Club Bamberg-Kunigunde

== Research activities ==
- 2023–2026 DFG research unit "Self-Organization and Horizontal Binding Forces: Local Authorities in Ancient Judaism from the 6th century BCE to the 1st century CE"
- 2019–2023 DFG Research Unit "LoSAM - Local Self-Governance in the context of Weak Statehood in Antiquity and the Modern Era; PI of the subproject “Local self-governance in Judea in the second century BCE: Historical and Literary Perspectives”. (FOR 2757)

== Other activities ==
- Advisor to the Sub-Commission „Für die religiösen Beziehungen zum Judentum“ (For Religious Relations with Judaism) of the Commission for Economical Relations (II) of the German Bishops’ Conference
- Co-editor of the series “Stuttgarter Biblische Beiträge“ (SBB), Verlag Katholisches Bibelwerk, Stuttgart
- Regular contributor to the literature information (reviews) of the journal “Biblische Notizen. Neue Folge”, ed. by Friedrich V. Reiterer, Austria
- Commentary on the Book of Judith for the series “Internationaler Exegetischer Kommentar zum Alten Testament” (International Exegetical Commentary on the Old Testament) in German and International Exegetical Commentary on the Old Testament (IECOT) in English

== Memberships ==
- Member of the discussion group “Jews and Christians”at the Central Committee of the German Catholics (zdk) and the German Ecumenical Academic Committee (DÖSTA) of the Association of Christian Churches in Germany (ACK)
- Member of Society of Biblical Literature (SBL)
- Member of AGENDA - Forum katholischer Theologinnen e.V.
- Member of European Society for Women’s Theological Research, ESWTR )Europäische Gesellschaft für die theologische Forschung von Frauen)
- Member of Forum of former students in the theological academic year Dormition Abbey Jerusalem e. V.
- Member of the Ecumenical Commission of the Diocese of Würzburg
- Supervisor, certified by the Deutsche Gesellschaft für Supervision und Coaching DGSv (German Society for Supervision and Coaching and the Systemische Gesellschaft, SG (Systemic Society)
- Certificate Themenzentrierte Interaktion (Topic-Centered Interaction, TZI) at the Ruth Cohn Institute
- Member of the Scientific Advisory Board of “Theologie im Fernkurs” (Theology in Correspondence Courses)
- Member of the “International Advisory Panel of the International Society for the Study of Deuterocanonical and Cognate Literature” (ISDCL)
- The International Organization for Septuagint and Cognate Studies (IOSCS), Member of the Executive Committee
- Member of the Board of Directors of the “Arbeitsgemeinschaft der Deutschsprachigen Alttestamentlerinnen und Alttestamentler” (Association of German-speaking Old Testament Scholars, AGAT)
- Member of the Board of Directors of the Gesellschaft für christlich-jüdisches Zusammenarbeit in Würzburg und Unterfranken e.V. (Society for Christian-Jewish Cooperation in Würzburg and Lower Franconia)
