= Abū Ḥudhayfa Isḥāq ibn Bishr al-Qurashī =

Abū Ḥudhayfa Isḥāq ibn Bishr al-Qurashī (Arabic: أبو حذيفة بن بشر القرشي, d. 206/821) was the author of Mubtadaʾ al-dunyā wa-qiṣaṣ al-anbiyāʾ (Arabic: كتاب مبتدأ الدنيا وقصص الأنبياء, 'the beginning of the world and the stories of the prophets'), an important early work in the qiṣaṣ al-anbiyāʾ (Islamic histories of prophets) genre. Long thought to be lost, a copy was identified around the early 1990s in the manuscript Oxford, Bodleian Library, Huntington 388. Though fragmentary, the manuscript contains over two hundred folios, covering biblical history from the Creation to Abraham, indicating its importance in the development of the genre.
