= Ecumenical Council of Lyon =

Ecumenical Council of Lyon may refer to two councils held in the Primacy of Lyon:

- the First Ecumenical Council of Lyon in 1245, being the Thirteenth Ecumenical Council
- the Second Ecumenical Council of Lyon in 1274
