= De Machometo =

Latin biography of Muhammad

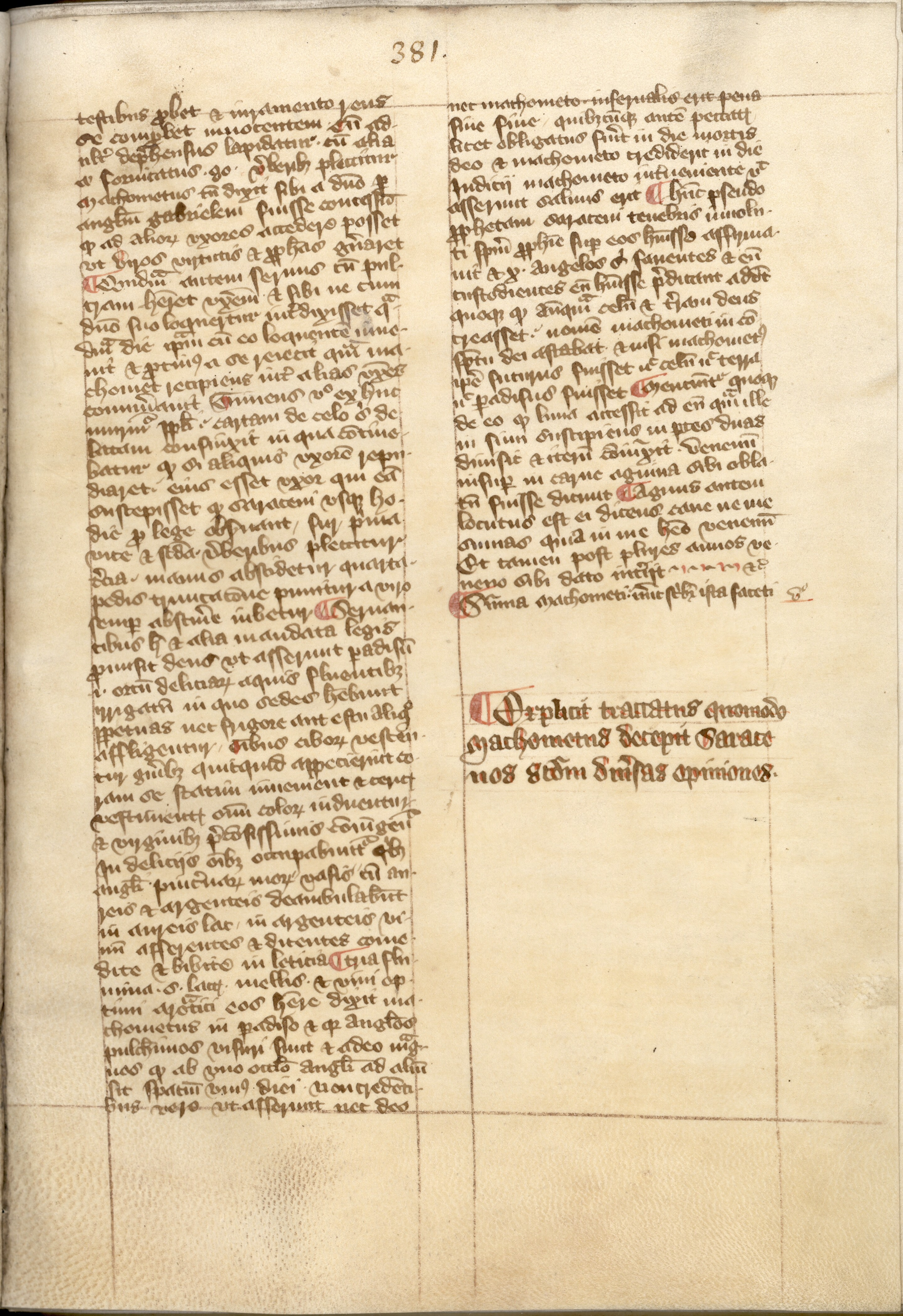
The end of the tract in the Copenhagen manuscript. The text set apart at the end of the second column is the explicit and repeats the title.

De Machometo ('On Muḥammad') is a brief anonymous Latin tract on the life of Muḥammad from a Christian point of view. It begins in the reign of Pope Boniface IV (608–615). Its account is cobbled together from a variety of sources, including the fifth dialogue of Petrus Alphonsi's Dialogi in quibus impiae Judaeorum confutantur, the Corozan legend and possibly the Libellus in partibus transmarinis de Machometi fallaciis from Vincent of Beauvais's Speculum historiale. The composite account is very similar to the account of Muḥammad found in the Golden Legend.

It is known from at least four manuscripts:

- Copenhagen, Royal Danish Library, Acc. 2011/5, ff. 193r–194r (pp. 379–381), from the late 14th century
- Cambridge, University Library, MS Dd.1.17, ff. 79rb–79rv (incomplete), from c. 1400
- London, British Library, MS Royal 13.E.IX, ff. 93r–94r, from c. 1395–1425
- London, British Library, MS Sloane 289, ff. 92v–95v, from the mid-15th century

De Machometo follows William of Tripoli's De statu Sarracenorum in both the Copenhagen and Cambridge manuscripts. The text has never been edited.

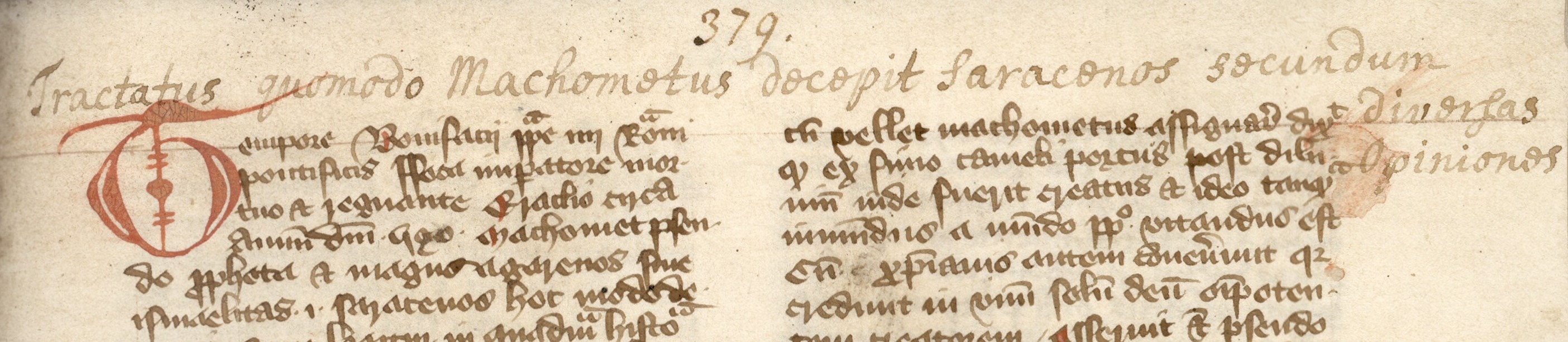
The title as it appears in the Copenhagen manuscript.

== Bibliography ==
- Arnold, F. E. A. (1964). "The Source of the Alexander History in B.M. MS Sloane 289". Medium Ævum. 33 (3): 195–199. doi:10.2307/43627115. JSTOR 43627115.
- Bolton, Timothy (2009). "A Newly Emergent Mediaeval Manuscript Containing Encomium Emmae reginae with the Only Known Complete Text of the Recension Prepared for King Edward the Confessor". Mediaeval Scandinavia. 19: 205–221.
- Daniel, Norman (1980). Islam and the West: The Making of an Image. Edinburgh University Press. ISBN 978-0-85224-109-7.
- Whitelock, Jill, ed. (2005). The Seven Sages of Rome (Midland Version). Oxford University Press.
- Wood, Sarah (2022). Piers Plowman and Its Manuscript Tradition. York Medieval Press.
