= Tractatus de ortu Tartarorum =

1244–1245 Latin treatise

The start of the Tractatus as it appears in Matthew of Paris's autograph manuscript

The Tractatus de ortu Tartarorum ("Treatise on the Rise of the Tartars") is a Latin treatise on the Mongols (Tartars), consisting of answers given by a Russian bishop named Peter to questions posed by Pope Innocent IV and the College of Cardinals in late 1244. The Tractatus originally circulated among the clergy assembled for the First Council of Lyon in 1245. It had a profound effect on the pope, convincing him to send embassies to the Mongols to negotiate peace.

The purpose of Peter's mission to the West and who, if anybody, was behind it have provoked much speculation. He has been seen as a refugee from the Mongol invasion acting on his own initiative, as an envoy sent by the Mongols to sow disinformation and as a representative of the Russian church seeking to advance the cause of church union. At the time of his visit, he was the acting vicar of the metropolitanate of Kiev and the effective leader of the Russian church. He participated in the Council of Lyon.

The Tractatus contains a lengthy section on Mongol origins that is based mainly on an interpretation of the Apocalypse of Pseudo-Methodius. The rest of the work contains original information, seemingly supplied by a son-in-law of Genghis Khan, either an exile or a spy. It is mostly an accurate account, albeit one that magnifies both the Mongols' strength and their willingness to negotiate.

== Manuscripts ==
The Tractatus was incorporated into the contemporary Chronica maiora of Matthew of Paris. It is also known from four other manuscripts:

- Copenhagen, Royal Danish Library, Acc. 2011/5, known as the Courtenay Compendium, at pages 315a–316b
- London, British Library, Cotton Vespasian E.iii, at folio 29r–v
- Gonville and Caius College, Cambridge, 162/83, at folio 106r–v
- Linz, Oberösterreichische Landesbibliothek, 446, at folio 267vb

Cotton Vespasian E.iii is the only known copy of the Burton Annals. Its copy of the Tractatus omits a few phrases. It is otherwise very similar to the Gonville and Caius copy. The Linz copy contains a few significant variant readings. Matthew of Paris altered the text of the Tractatus to better fit it into his Chronica, inserting glosses and comments of his own.

== Circumstances of creation ==
The Tractatus introduced as the response of Petrus archiepiscopus de Belgrab in Ruscia in the Linz manuscript

The information in the Tractatus represents the answers given by a certain Russian bishop named Peter to questions posed to him by Pope Innocent IV and the cardinals late in 1244 in advance of the First Council of Lyon. Peter is not known from any other source. Every version of the Tractatus refers to him as "archbishop of Russia" (archiepiscopus Russiae) except the Linz manuscript, which specifies him as archbishop of Belgorod (archiepiscopus de Belgrab). Belgorod was in fact a mere diocese, but its bishop frequently acted as vicar for the metropolitan of Kiev. The see of Kiev was vacant between late 1240 and the appointment of Cyril II in 1246, which explains why Westerners referred to Peter as an archbishop. Although various identifications have been put forward in the past, the identification of Peter with a previously unidentified bishop of Belgorod is now generally accepted. The identification with the Abbot Peter Akerovich is discredited.

According to Matthew of Paris, Peter "was driven from his territory and his archbishopric by the Tatars, and came ... to obtain advice and assistance, and comfort in his trouble, if, by the gift of God, the Roman Church and the kind favour of the princes of those parts could assist him." Many scholars have questioned whether Peter in fact travelled to the West of his own accord or was sent on a mission and, if so, by whom. The Mongols had captured Kiev in 1240, but nothing is known of Peter's activities for the period between 1240 and 1244.

If Peter was acting under orders from any Russian ruler at the time, it was probably the prince of Kiev, Yaroslav Vsevolodovich, who had submitted to Batu Khan in 1243. It has been argued that Peter may have been acting under Mongol orders. Matthew of Paris records that Peter first came to Italy before arriving at Lyon. He may have first met Innocent IV at Genoa in the fall of 1244. The Burton Annals record that Peter knew neither Latin nor Greek and had to be interrogated through an interpreter. The written record of Peter's answers to the pope and cardinals' questions—the Tractatus—circulated among the assembled prelates at Lyon. Peter may have been questioned again about the Mongols at the council in June 1245.

Peter was also subjected to a theological examination and "brilliantly expounded the Gospel." At Lyon, he took part in the divine service wearing his Orthodox vestments. Some modern researchers have concluded that Peter must not have adhered to Eastern Orthodoxy. On the other hand, it has been argued that the main purpose of Peter's visit was to attend the council of Lyon to discuss healing the East–West schism. Innocent IV urged Tsar Kaliman I of Bulgaria to send representatives and in the bull Cum simus super urged all the other Eastern Christians not in union with Rome to send representatives. In the end, the only known non-Latin cleric present was Peter. Although Innocent referred to the schism when addressing the council, the council is not known to have discussed it in session. The issue was raised by the Emperor Frederick II, who, through his representative at the council, Taddeo da Suessa, claimed that he could restore the unity of the church if he and the pope made peace. Partly to this end, he had already married his daughter Constance to the Greek emperor John Vatatzes.

== Contents ==
Start of the Tractatus in the Burton Annals

The longest answer in the Tractatus concerns the origins of the Mongols. The answer given is not based, however, on any special intelligence gleaned from the Mongols themselves, but on a standard Russian interpretation of the 7th-century Apocalypse of Pseudo-Methodius. The Mongols are identified with the Midianites defeated by Gideon in Judges 7. They are said to have been consigned to the wilderness of Etrev, whence they emerged after thousands of years. (Etrev is in fact Yathrib, the city from which Muhammad emerged to conquer Mecca.) The Mongols believe they are destined to wage a war against the King of the Romans. They were told by Heaven that their domination will last 49 years (seven weeks of years). All of this information is derived from the Apocalypse. Friar Julian heard similar things from a Russian cleric during his travels in 1236–1237.

After the emergence of the Mongols out of the wilderness, the Tractatus contains original information. Their leader was Chir Can or Cirkan, who had been provoked by Curzeusa, ruler of Ornac. These corrupted names are recognizable as Genghis Khan, the Khwarazmshah and Urgench, respectively. This is a clear reference to the Mongol invasion of the Khwarazmian Empire. In the Linz version, Peter claims that the Mongols believe the pope to be the greatest ruler in the world and are eager to visit him. He also claims that they follow John the Baptist, which appears to be based on a misunderstanding of the image of Genghis Khan that was kept in a wagon outside the Great Khan's tent.

About Mongol law, Peter claims that they punished murder, theft, lying and adultery. He reports that they respected treaties, although they always demanded services. They respected ambassadors and diplomatic practice. They resorted to cannibalism only in emergencies out of necessity, and they always cooked human flesh before eating it. They were physically stronger and more robust than westerners. He could not estimate their numbers, but they had been joined by many nations and members of all religions. Their forces were active on three fronts: against Egypt, against the Turks and against the Hungarians and Poles. They intended to bring all their armies together in Syria and their ultimate goal was world conquest. Peter praises their military abilities. They were excellent archers. Even their women were warriors. Their leather armour was impenetrable and their siege engines were excellent. When asked how they crossed bodies of water, Peter answered that they crossed rivers on horseback and were preparing ships in three locations. There is no other evidence that the Mongols had naval capabilities in the 1240s. At the end of the Tractatus, it is revealed that Peter's source for much of his information was "a certain Tartar grandee named Chalaladan whose wife was Chirkan's daughter" and who was living in exile in Russia. There is no other record of a son-in-law of Genghis Khan with a name like this, but not all of his daughters by his several wives are known by name.

== Legacy ==
The Courtenay copy of the Tractatus, to which two letters are appended

Nothing is known of Peter's activities after the council of Lyon nor whether he remained in the West or returned home. The information he gave is basically accurate with the exception of his own theories based on Pseudo-Methodius and some apparent misunderstandings. It has been argued that he was nevertheless misleading in his answers regarding diplomacy, since the Mongols treated all diplomatic gestures as the first step towards submission and nothing other than submission was on offer. Altogether, he presents the Mongols as exceedingly dangerous yet open to negotiation. There is the possibility, therefore, that he was acting on Mongol directives and was not entirely forthcoming with his hosts.

If the purpose of Peter's mission was to encourage Western leaders to send diplomats to the Mongols, it was successful. In March 1245, on the eve of the council, the pope sent three missions to each of the fronts on which Peter described the Mongols as active: Andrew of Longjumeau to Palestine and Syria, Ascelin of Lombardy towards eastern Europe and Simon of Saint-Quentin to Anatolia. Whether Peter's intention or not, the timing of these missions strongly suggests that they were determined by Peter's answer that the Mongols respected diplomats.

== Related texts ==
The Tractatus is accompanied in both the Courtenay Compendium and the Gonville and Caius manuscript by two letters. These separate texts have often been mistaken as parts of the Tractatus. In the Courtenay Compendium, the scribe even placed the explicit marking the end of the Tractatus after the letters.

The first letter is from a bishop of Hungary and recounts his interrogation of two Mongol captives. It probably dates to 1239–1240. It was also incorporated into the Waverley Annals and was among the Additamenta ("additions") appended by Matthew of Paris to his Chronica. In the Courtenay Compendium and the Gonville and Caius manuscript, it appears under the heading Anno domini millessimo cc^{mo} xliv transmissa est haec prelato parisius de adventu Tartarorum ("in the year of the Lord 1244 this [letter] concerning the advent of the Tartars was sent to the bishop in Paris").

The second letter, entitled Nova pestis contra ecclesiam ("A Fresh Affliction Confronting the Church"), was addressed by the patriarch of Jerusalem to the pope. It probably dates to 1244, when the Mongols first made an incursion into Syria. It is found in two other manuscripts: Paris, Bibliothèque nationale de France, Lat. 4794 and a private manuscript that was in Florence in 1927. According to the Florentine manuscript, the letter was forwarded to the bishop of Constance by the apostolic legate in Germany. The version in the Parisian manuscript is shorter.

== Bibliography ==
- Bolton, Timothy (2009). "A Newly Emergent Mediaeval Manuscript Containing Encomium Emmae reginae with the Only Known Complete Text of the Recension Prepared for King Edward the Confessor". Mediaeval Scandinavia. 19: 205–221.
- Epstein, Steven A. (2006). Purity Lost: Transgressing Boundaries in the Eastern Mediterranean, 1000–1400. Johns Hopkins University Press.
- Jackson, Peter (2005). The Mongols and the West, 1221–1410. Routledge.
- Jackson, Peter (2016). "The Testimony of the Russian 'Archbishop' Peter Concerning the Mongols (1244/5): Precious Intelligence or Timely Disinformation?". Journal of the Royal Asiatic Society. 26 (1–2): 65–77. doi:10.1017/s135618631500084x.
- Luard, Henry Richards, ed. (2012) [1883]. Matthaei Parisiensis monachi Sancti Albani chronica majora. Vol. 4: AD 1240 to AD 1247. Cambridge University Press. doi:10.1017/CBO9781139226011.
- Maiorov, Alexander V. (2019). "The Rus Archbishop Peter at the First Council of Lyon". The Journal of Ecclesiastical History. 71 (1): 1–20. doi:10.1017/s0022046919001143.
- Ruotsala, Antti (2001). Europeans and Mongols in the Middle of the Thirteenth Century: Encountering the Other. Finnish Academy of Science and Letters.
- Selart, Anti (2011). "Архиепископ Петр и Лионский собор 1245 года'" [Archbishop Peter and the Council of Lyon, 1245]. Rossica Antiqua. 1: 100–113.
- Veselov, Fedor N. (2021). "Omens of Apocalypse: The First Rus' Encounter with the Mongols through the Prism of the Medieval Mind". In Alexander V. Maiorov; Roman Hautala (eds.). The Routledge Handbook of the Mongols and Central-Eastern Europe: Political, Economic, and Cultural Relations. Routledge. pp. 15–35.
