= Courtenay Compendium =

Medieval English manuscript

Start of Gildas (note the red capital G in the left column) on p. 129

The Courtenay Compendium (now Copenhagen, Royal Danish Library, Acc. 2011/5) is a medieval English manuscript containing a miscellany of historical texts. It contains three blocks of texts. The first concerns British and English history. The second has an oriental focus and contains accounts of Europeans in China, the Crusades, Islam and the rise of the Mongols. The third contains prophecies.

== Provenance ==
The manuscript is of the late 14th century. It was probably created at Breamore Priory in Hampshire. It was acquired by the Earls of Devon of the House of Courtenay, whence its name. It was rediscovered in the archives of Powderham Castle in Devon during the time of the 18th earl, Hugh Courtenay (b.1942-d.2015). On 3 December 2008, it was auctioned by Sotheby's to a private dealer, who sold it at auction to the Royal Danish Library in March 2010.

== Physical description ==
The compendium consists of 230 parchment leaves bound as a codex and measuring 272 by 190 millimetres (10.7 in × 7.5 in). Its contents are written entirely in the same hand, in cursive Anglicana script. The main text is dark brown, but there are initials and paragraph markers in red ink by a different scribe. The manuscript was paginated in the early modern period, by which time some pages were out of order. Catchwords allow the proper order to be established. In the 18th century, the compendium was rebound. The cover is decorated with the Courtenay arms and the spine labelled VARIÆ TRACTATI MSS.

== Contents ==
The contents of the manuscript are grouped into three sections, with three blank pages separating the first two and a single blank page between the second and third. The first section concerns the history of Troy and Britain, the second concerns the Orient and the third is prophecies. The contents are:

1. Trojan and British history
  1. Anonymous, Daretis Phrygii de excidio Troiae historia with an introductory letter attributed to Cornelius Nepos
  2. Geoffrey of Monmouth, Historia regum Brittanniae, followed by a table of rulers, Tabula in historiis Britonum
  3. Gildas, De excidio Britanniae
  4. Anonymous, Encomium Emmae Reginae, which is called Tractatus de gestis regis Chnutonis in the explicit
2. The Orient
  1. Marco Polo, De conditionibus et consuetudinibus orientalium regionum (Latin translation of Francesco Pipino)
  2. Odoric of Pordenone, De ritibus orientalium regionum
  3. Peter, 'archbishop of Russia', Tractatus de ortu Tartarorum, including two other letters about the Mongols:
    1. A letter from a Hungarian bishop reporting the interrogation of two Mongol prisoners, a text that is also found in Matthew of Paris, Chronica maiora, and in the Annals of Waverley
    2. A letter from Raoul of Mérencourt, patriarch of Jerusalem, to Pope Honorius III outlining the Mongol threat around 1221
  4. Anonymous, Gesta Francorum et aliorum Hierosolimitanorum, which is called Tractatus de ortu processu et actibus Machometi in the explicit rubric
  5. William of Tripoli, Gesta Machometi (that is, De statu Sarracenorum)
  6. Anonymous, De Machometo
3. Prophecies
  1. 26 prophetic texts in prose and verse all associated with and probably written in England

The compendium contains the only extant copy of the recension of the Encomium Emmae Reginae prepared for Edward the Confessor.

== Bibliography ==
- Bolton, Timothy (2009). "A Newly Emergent Mediaeval Manuscript Containing Encomium Emmae reginae with the Only Known Complete Text of the Recension Prepared for King Edward the Confessor". Mediaeval Scandinavia. 19: 205–221.
- Jackson, Peter (2016). "The Testimony of the Russian 'Archbishop' Peter Concerning the Mongols (1244/5): Precious Intelligence or Timely Disinformation?". Journal of the Royal Asiatic Society. 26 (1–2): 65–77. doi:10.1017/s135618631500084x.
