= List of parish churches in the Diocese of Aberdeen =

The development of parish churches in the Diocese of Aberdeen began, as in the rest of Scotland and Europe, in the earlier Middle Ages. The expression parochia changed over time from its original meaning in the 12th century of being the territory over which a bishop had authority (Note: In the 12th century, the area over which the bishop had authority did not always mean diocese. For example, Cumbria was subject to the jurisdiction of the bishop of Glasgow—parochia Cumbrensis—although it was not part of the diocese (c. 1120).)to its later definition of being a locality that was subject to the ecclesiastic charge of a baptismal church. This shift was complete by the 13th century when parochia and parochia ecclesia became entirely associated with the parish church. The development of the parochial system in Scotland has been attributed to the reforming zeal of King David I and his introduction of Anglo-Norman lords yet it is also true that the process had begun under David's predecessors and the native Scottish aristocracy. Some of the early parochial-type entities that had formed remained unaltered under David's reshaping of the ecclesiastical landscape. Importantly, David played a significant role in formalising the role of the parish church and securing its sustainability.

== Deaneries ==
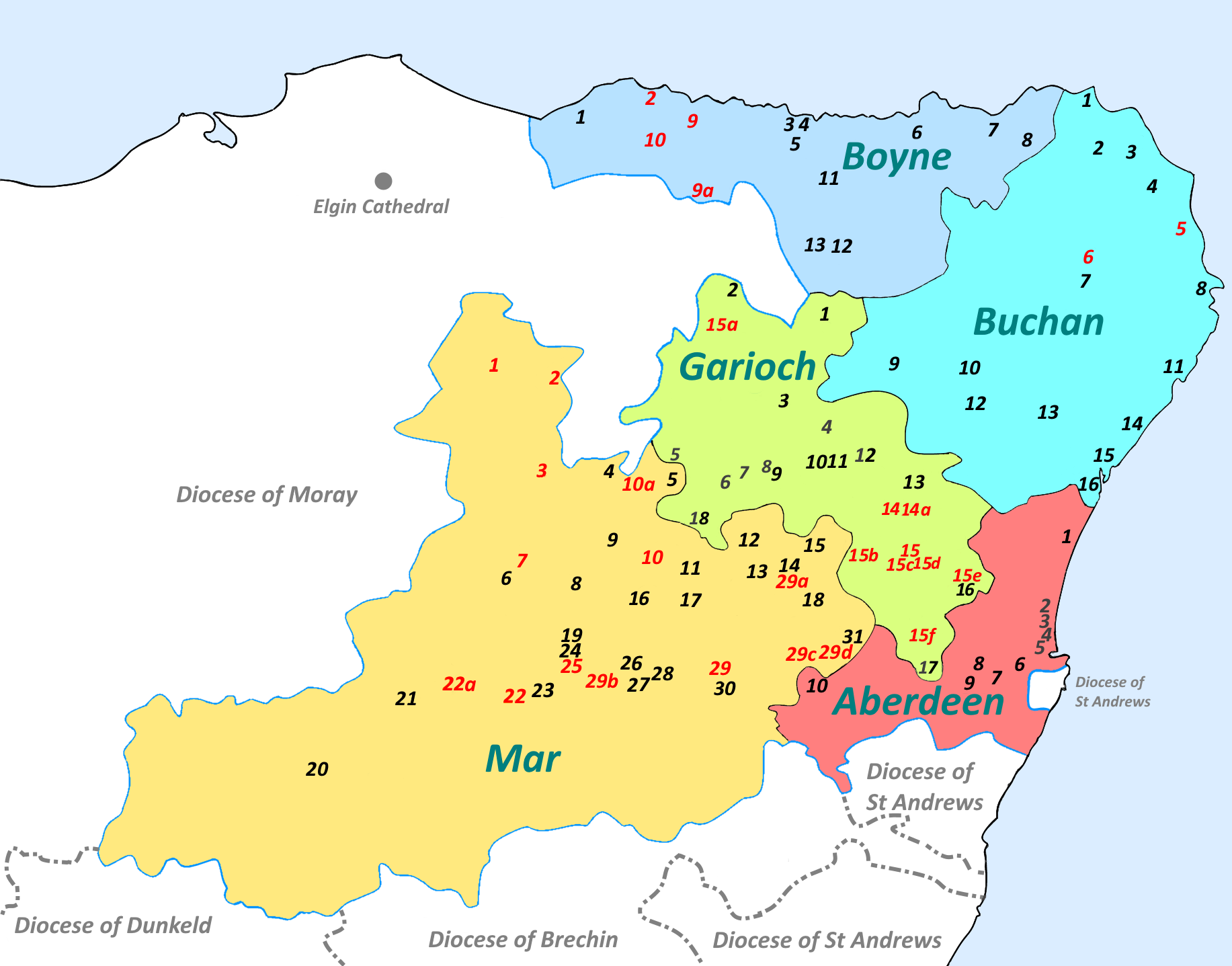
Parishes of Diocese of Aberdeen by Deanery (see tables, below) parish churches marked in red indicate former chapels of a mother church that achieved parochial status, e.g. Mar, 1 & 2 or, parish churches with their retained pendicle chapels e.g. Garioch, 14 & 14a

=== Aberdeen ===
Dean of Christianity first recorded date:1250 x 1256

Parish	Map reference	Foundation / confirmation	Appropriation	Cure of souls
Aberdeen–St Machar	2	Church, also known as Kyrkton, was that of the vill of Old Aberdeen. Confirmed to Bishop of Aberdeen as the cathedral church in 1157—also described as "baptismal and parochial"	Provided as the dean's prebend by 1256, retaining both the parsonage and vicarage	A pensionary vicar provided the cure
Aberdeen–St Nicholas	5	This was the church of New Aberdeen. Confirmed to Bishop of Aberdeen in 1157	Provided as the bishop's prebend by 1256, retaining both the parsonage and vicarage. The vicarage also supported two chaplains in 1427. In 1491, the church had 22 chaplains but around the same time, the number of chaplains was reduced to 16. In 1540, St Nicholas was a constituted collegiate church when the vicarage and 6 choir boys were provided to 'the Colledge of the Chaplenis of the said Sanct Niclas Kirk . . . for the sustentatioun of ane provest'	In 1345, the cure was served by a perpetual vicar.
Aberdeen–Snow	4	The parish was erected following a papal bull of 1497 and confirmed by Bishop Elphinstone in 1498	Appropriated to the university (later King's College) in 1499. Known to the parishioners as the Snaw Kirk, the Snow referred to the dedication St Mary ad Nives, or St Mary of the Snows. The vicar (later called parson) had the prebend and had to lecture on canon law	The cure was provided by a curate.
Aberdeen–Spittal	3	Apparently emerged following the limited suppression of the hospital of St Peter in 1427. Bishop Henry had found that 'the masters of the hospital had been applying the revenues to their own use without regard to the poor'	The fruits of the parish founded two cathedral chaplaincies. Later a new cathedral office of sub-chanter was created (1526x34) and had appropriated to it the revenues of the 'hospitale kirk of Sanct Petir'. The hospital retained some endowments and was still functioning in 1541	One of the founding chaplains provided the cure.
Banchory–Devenick	6	Confirmed to Bishop of Aberdeen as cathedral church in 1157	Erected into a prebend of the cathedral by 1256 receiving the revenues of the parsonage only	A perpetual vicar is later present to provide the cure
Banchory–Ternan	10	Also known as Banchory-Trinity. Granted to Arbroath Abbey by William the Lion (1178) and confirmed by Bishop Mathew (1178–99)	Only the parsonage was annexed	A vicarage arrangement was documented in 1257 presumably for a vicar perpetual
Belhelvie	1	Confirmed to Bishop of Aberdeen as cathedral church in 1157	Erected into a prebend of the cathedral by 1256, retaining all its revenues.	The cure was provided by a vicar pensioner
Culter	8	The parish of Culter had been annexed to Kelso Abbey from the time of David I and confirmed to Kelso by William the Lion (1187x99) and by John, Bishop of Aberdeen to the uses of Kelso (1200x07). The chapel of Maryculter was founded in this parish by the Knight Templars (1221X36). Kelso objected to the Templers' having a chapel within the parish. In 1286, the Templars' rights were upheld and this led to a division of the parish. The original parish church of Culter was renamed Peterculter and remained annexed to Kelso while Maryculter remained with the Templers along with the parsonage and vicarage.	See Maryculter and Peterculter	See Maryculter and Peterculter
Dalmayock	9	Also known as Dalmaik and Drumoak. Confirmed to Bishop of Aberdeen in 1157	Was erected as a prebend in 1368 and subsequently remained as that	The cure was provided a vicar pensionary
Maryculter	7	Originally a chapel built by the Knights Templar (1221x36). (The parish was partitioned following a dispute with the house of the Knights Templar. See Culter, above, for the dispute between Kelso Abbey and the Knights Templar)	Became a parish church with the parsonage and vicarage annexed to the Knights Templar	The cure was served by vicar pensionary
Peterculter	8	This is the original parish church of Culter confirmed to Kelso Abbey by William the Lion (1187x99) and by Bishop of Aberdeen (1200x07). (The parish was partitioned following a dispute with the house of the Knights Templar. See Culter, above, for the dispute between Kelso Abbey and the Knights Templar)	Only the parsonage was annexed	The cure was provided by a vicar perpetual

=== Boyne ===
Dean of Christianity first recorded date: 1250 x 1256

Parish	Map reference	Foundation / confirmation	Appropriation	Cure of souls
Aberdour	7	Henry Cheyne, bishop of Aberdeen is acknowledged as the originator of the parish in 1318. The first definite confirmation of its status was in 1432.	Confirmation of the church as a cathedral prebend was made at its creation. The appropriation was of both parsonage and vicarage	A vicar pensioner served the cure
Alvah	5	Marjory, countess of Atholl (widow of John, earl of Atholl) granted the patronage to Coupar Abbey, c. 1308 for its own uses and confirmed by the bishop of Aberdeen On 28 January 1315 but for some reason the grant was ineffective for around 50 years	All revenues were annexed to the abbey	The cure was served by a perpetual vicar pensioner
Banff	4	Confirmed to the uses of Arbroath Abbey by Mathew, bishop of Aberdeen (1178 – 1180) and by William the Lion (1212 x 14) who was likely the donor	The abbey retained the parsonage	In 1257, the vicarage settlement revealed that the churches of Banff and Inverboyndie had united. The now single vicarage (vicar's status unknown) served the cure
Cullen	2	Originally called Invercullen, it was a pendicle chapel of Fordyce. In 1236 it was supplicating for parochial rank which it later successfully achieved	The church of Fordyce retained the revenues of the parsonage and the vicarage which in turn were held by the common fund of the canons of Aberdeen cathedral before 1272	The cure was served by a chaplain until 1543 when, following the foundation of the collegiate church of Cullen by Alexander Ogilvy of Findlater, the church's parochial functions were provided to the collegiate church's prebend of St Mary the Virgin with the chaplain's position incorporated to the collegiate church. See Fordyce, below
Deskford	10	Originally a pendicle chapel of Fordyce and was rebuilt in 1541. It is mentioned as a church in 1551 when Alexander Ogilvy of that Ilk and his wife gift an elaborate sacrament house to the church	Appropriation of the parsonage and vicarage to the canons of Aberdeen Cathedral	A curate served the cure
Fordyce	9	This was a common church with its pendicle chapels of Cullen, Deskford and Ordiquehill	Both Parsonage and vicarage were appropriated to the canons of Aberdeen cathedral before 1272	Fordyce had a vicar pensioner for its cure. See Cullen, above
Forglen	13	William the Lion (1204 – 11) granted the lands of Forglen—and the Monymusk Brecbennach for safekeeping—to Arbroath Abbey but with no mention of a church. The church of Forglen, either pre-existing or established by the monks, was subsequently granted to the uses of the abbey by three consecutive bishops of Aberdeen between 1207 and 1247.	The patronage appears to have been retained by the abbey. From the 14th century (or possibly earlier) the abbey appears to have continually subinfeud the lands and patronage	A vicarage settlement was agreed in 1250 but the vicarage status is unknown
Gamrie	6	Granted to Arbroath Abbey by William the Lion (1189 x 99). Mathew, bishop of Aberdeen (1172 – 99) confirmed the uses to the abbey (1172 x 99)|	the parsonage continued with the abbey	The cure was served by a vicarage perpetual by 1250
Inverboyndie	3	Also known as Boyndie. William the Lion, the probable donor, later confirmed the church to Arbroath Abbey (1211 – 14) Mathew, bishop of Aberdeen had confirmed the uses to the abbey (1172 – 99)	The abbey retained the parsonage	In 1257, the vicarage settlement revealed that the churches of Banff and Inverboyndie had united. The now single vicarage served the cure but the vicar's status is unknown
Kinedward	11	John Comyn, earl of Buchan granted the church to the Abbey of Deer (1290 x 1308) and was confirmed by Robert I.	The abbey retained the vicarage and parsonage through to the Reformation although a pension from the revenues was paid to the canons of Aberdeen cathedral	A vicar pensioner served the cure
Ordiquhill	9a	Also called Tullywhull, it was a pendicle chapel of Fordyce and remained so until the Reformation	All revenues passed with the annexation of Fordyce to the use of the canons of Aberdeen Cathedral before 1272	The cure was served by a curate
Rathven	1	The foundation of the church of Rathven is unknown. **check Dundurcas & Kiltarlity in diocese of Moray **	The hospital of Rathven (dedicated to St Peter) was founded by John Byseth (1224 x 26) and the fruits of the church of Rathven were annexed to it. The revenues of Dundurcus and Kiltarlity were also appropriated to the hospital. The hospital and its possessions were erected into a prebend of Aberdeen cathedral in 1445. The parsonage remained annexed to the cathedral although revenues were directed to support three bedesmen at the hospital. The vicarage was appropriated to the collegiate church of Cullen in 1543	The cure was served by a vicar pensioner
Turriff	12	Granted by Marjory, countess of Buchan to Arbroath Abbey and confirmed by William the Lion (1212 x 14) and Adam, bishop of Aberdeen (1207 x 1228). Apparently, the annexation was unsuccessful for, on the foundation of the hospital of Turriff on 6 February 1273 by Alexander Cumyn, earl of Buchan, Comyn granted the church revenues to the hospital. The bishop of Aberdeen confirmed the church to the uses of the hospital.	In 1342, the Comyn earldom of Buchan passed to the crown and with it, the patronage of the hospital. Robert III granted the patronage of the hospital and church to Coupar Abbey in 1379. This transaction also proved ineffective and in 1412 the bishop of Aberdeen received the consent of John Stewart, earl of Buchan to erect the hospital and church into a prebend of Aberdeen cathedral. The earl and his successors retained the patronage	The cure was served by a vicar pensioner
Tyrie	8	The church foundation information is unknown.	The Bagimonds Roll describes the church as being a vicarage with the incumbent vicar having the obligation for the taxation of the church giving the impression that a previous appropriation had been altered in some manner. Subsequently, the church seems to have continued as an independent parsonage with the patronage held by the earls of Douglas and then to the Crown after the Douglas forfeiture.	The Crown held the patronage up to the Reformation but the details of the vicarage settlement are unknown

=== Buchan ===
Dean of Christianity first recorded date: 1199 x 1207

Parish	Map reference	Foundation / confirmation	Appropriation	Cure of souls
Bethelnay	16	William Comyn, Earl of Buchan granted church to Arbroath Abbey in 1221. Bishop Gilbert (1228x39) confirmed it to the abbey's uses.	The parsonage was annexed to the abbey	In 1257 a settlement on the vicarage provision was agreed but the terms are unknown
Crimond	4	Foundation unknown	It seems that Bishop Richard erected the parsonage and vicarage into a prebend of Aberdeen Cathedral in 1262 and was definitely in 1437. In 1505, the annexations were changed with the parsonage only remaining with the prebend	The re-erected (presumably perpetual) vicarage provided the cure of souls
Cruden	11	The papal bull of 1157 named the parish as Invercrouden and confirmed it to the bishop of Aberdeen.	Both parsonage and vicarage were annexed to the prebend of the canons of Aberdeen Cathedral in 1256	It remained like this going forward with the cure provided by a vicar pensioner
Deer	7	The church apparently belonged to Deer Abbey from its inception in 1219 and confirmed in 1256	In 1256 the abbot agreed to 20 marks from the church revenues being granted as a prebend of Aberdeen Cathedral	The parsonage and vicarage remained with the Abbey and the cure provided by a chaplain
Ellon	13	In 1310 Robert I granted the church to Kinloss Abbey. Confirmation of the uses was provided by Bishop Henry de Cheyne after William Comyn, Earl of Buchan relinquished his rights of patronage in c. 1320	Following Comyn's abjuration a vicar perpetual was put in place. In 1328 the vicarage was appropriated by Bishop Henry to the use of the abbey. The conditions attached to the annexation were that 24 marks be provided towards the erection of a prebend in the cathedral and 100 shillings to be provided for one of the cathedral chaplains. Additionally, the vicar was to receive a stipend of 20 marks	The cure was served firstly, by a vicar perpetual between 1320 and 1328, and secondly, by a vicar pensioner from 1328 and continued at the Reformation
Fetterangus	6	The church was originally a chapel of Inverugie and was granted to Arbroath Abbey by Ralf le Naym. Confirmed to the uses of the abbey by Bishop Adam de Kalder (1207–28).	Afterwards, it gained parochial status with the parsonage staying with the abbey	The cure was provided by a vicar perpetual
Forvie	15	No foundation date available	A fallacious attribution of annexation to the Knights Templars	An independent parsonage through to the Reformation
Foveran	18	Granted to Deer Abbey by Robert I (1274 x 1329)	Church with parsonage and vicarage annexed to Deer Abbey. An allowance from the revenues was paid to the common fund of the canons of Aberdeen Cathedral	Vicarage settlement unknown.
Fyvie	9	Granted to Arbroath Abbey by William the Lion (1189x99). Confirmed by Bishop Mathew (1178x99)	A perpetual vicarage was established on or before 1257 with confirmation that year by Pope Alexander IV. A cell or priory of Fyvie belonging to Arbroath was created in 1285 and funded by Bishop Henry's annexure of the vicarage to the priory. A dispute developed regarding the appropriation of the vicarage that required it to be re-annexed to the priory in 1399. This had to be repeated by Bishop Henry de Lychtoun in 1427. A papal letter of 1451 described the house as no longer conventual and the prior was now also the parochial vicar. The priory and the abbey united in c. 1508 with the abbey receiving the revenues of the parsonage and the vicarage.	At the first and second annexations, a chaplain provided the cure. At the third annexation, the cure changed to a vicar pensioner and required payment for the upkeep of a chaplain of Aberdeen Cathedral.
Inverugie	5	Together with its chapel of Fetterangus, Inverugie was granted by Ralf de Naym to Arbroath Abbey. Confirmed by William the Lion (1212 x 1214) and Adam, Bishop of Aberdeen (1207 x 1228) to the uses of the abbey. The parsonage along with the revenues of Fetterangus stayed with the abbey	Henry le Chen and the abbey came to an arrangement in the mid-thirteenth century whereby the abbey retained the parsonage and le Chen obtained the right of provision of the vicarage. At this point, the parish became known as Longley or St Fergus.	The united churches operated as a single cure provided by a vicar perpetual
Logie-Buchan	17	King David II granted the church to Aberdeen Cathedral as a common church for the canons in 1361 and confirmed to the uses of the abbey by Alexander, Bishop of Aberdeen in 1362	Both parsonage and vicarage annexed. The chapter afterwards lost the benefice and the church was re-annexed back to the dean and chapter in 1437. The parsonage and vicarage remained annexed as before	The cure was provided by a vicar pensionary and remained as such after the re-annexation
Lonmay	3	Bishop Henry le Chen was credited with founding the church in 1314. Its annexation to the cathedral was confirmed in 1437	Both the parsonage and the vicarage were appropriated	The vicar's status is unknown
Methlick	10	Bishop Alexander de Kyninmund (II) was credited with founding this church in 1362 and confirmation of it as a prebend of the cathedral in 1366.	Both the parsonage and vicarage were annexed	The cure was served by a vicar pensionary
Peterugie	8	Also known as Peterhead, the parsonage and a small part of the revenues of the vicarage were annexed to Deer at the Reformation	Although the church's status is documented in 1544, it is clear that the appropriation goes back further	The cure was served by a vicar perpetual
Philorth	1	In 1345, King David II granted the church to the dean and chapter of Aberdeen to be erected into a prebend of the cathedral	A complicated series of ordinances began in 1330/1 when the patronage of the church was surrendered to King David II. In 1345, David granted the church to the dean and chapter of Aberdeen so that the bishop could erect it into a prebend of the chapter. An amendment to this grant, in 1349, now cancelled the formation of a prebend so that the fruits to be provided for the common use of the canons. This was further changed in a grant of 1361/2 that directed that the fruits support two chaplains of the cathedral	At the 1362 creation the cure was provided by a vicar perpetual. The remaining revenues were used to create a further prebend that was still in existence in 1437 but the vicarage had now been converted to a pensionary
Rathen	2	King Robert I granted the church to the chapter of the cathedral in 1327/8 for their own uses and was confirmed by Bishop Henry le Chen.	The appropriation was of both parsonage and vicarage	The cure was served by a vicar pensioner
Slains	14	James IV granted the church to the University of Aberdeen and was confirmed by Bishop William Elphinstone in December 1498.	James IV's grant stipulated that some of the revenues were to go to the intended collegiate church of the university. Both the parsonage and the vicarage were annexed to King's College and the revenues re-allocated in 1505 and again in 1531	The cure was provided by a vicar pensioner
Tarves	12	William the Lion granted the church to Arbroath Abbey (1189 x 99) and confirmed by Bishop Mathew to the uses of the abbey (1178 x 99)	The parsonage remained with the abbey. A bid to have an annexation of the vicarage to Fyvie Priory failed in 1399 but a pension taken from the revenues of the vicarage was provided to the priory	The details of a vicarage settlement of 1250 are unknown

=== Garioch ===
Dean of Christianity first recorded date: 1240 x 1247

Parish	Map reference	Foundation / confirmation	Appropriation	Cure of souls
Auchterless	1	Church confirmed to Bishop of Aberdeen in 1157.	Both the parsonage and the vicarage annexed as a prebend of the chanter of Aberdeen on or before 1256 and remained as such thereafter	The cure was delivered by a vicar pensioner
Bourtie	13	Granted to Priory of St Andrews and confirmed to its uses by Bishop William de Lamberton of Aberdeen (1172x99) but remained ineffective despite several more re-confirmations until that of Bishop Randulph in 1240.	The parsonage remained with the priory from 1240 onwards. The vicarage settlement was agreed upon in 1244	The status of the vicar is unknown
Culsalmond	3	Granted to Lindores Abbey by David, Earl of Huntingdon (1191–95) and confirmed by Pope Celestine III in 1195	The parsonage remained with the abbey	The cure was provided by a vicar perpetual, affirmed in 1257
Dalmayock	17	Also called Drumoak, it was originally confirmed to the bishop of Aberdeen in 1157.	Remained independent until 1368 when Bishop Alexander de Kynninmond (II) annexed both parsonage and vicarage as a prebend	The cure was provided by a vicar pensionary
Daviot	12	Confirmed to bishop of Aberdeen in 1157.	Annexed as a prebend of the treasurer of Aberdeen on or before 1256, retaining both the parsonage and vicarage	A curate served the cure
Drumblade	15a	One of the six pendicle chapels of Kinkell church	See Kinkell	See Kinkell
Dyce	15e	One of the six pendicle chapels of Kinkell church	See Kinkell	See Kinkell
Fintray	16	Granted to Lindores Abbey by David, Earl of Huntingdon (1191–95) and confirmed by Pope Celestine III in 1195	The parsonage remained with the abbey	The cure was provided by a vicar perpetual
Forgue	2	Known also as Ferendracht, Sir William of Ferendracht granted the church to Arbroath Abbey and confirmed to its uses in 1257 by Pope Alexander IV. Possession only secured c. 1268	The parsonage remained with the abbey	A chaplain was appointed to serve the cure but the 1257 confirmation stipulated that the parish should be served by a vicarage which was implemented before the 15th century
Insch	8	Also known as Inchmabanin, David, Earl of Huntingdon (1191 x 95) granted the church to Lindores Abbey and was confirmed to the uses of the abbey by Pope Celestine III in 1195	The parsonage remained with the abbey	The cure was provided by a vicar perpetual, affirmed in 1257
Inverurie	14	David, Earl of Huntingdon (1191 x 95) granted the church to Lindores Abbey and was confirmed to the uses of the abbey by Pope Celestine III in 1195. This church was apparently a chapel of Rothket church but with its demise, Inverurie was changed into the parish church and retained the attendant chapel of Monkegie.	The parsonage remained with the abbey	Ratification of the cure provision of a vicar perpetual was given in 1257
Kemnay	15b	One of the six pendicle chapels of Kinkell church.	See Kinkell	See Kinkell
Kinnellar	15d	One of the six pendicle chapels of Kinkell church.	See Kinkell	See Kinkell
Kinkell	15	From the 14th century, the house of the Knights Hospitallers at Torphichen apparently had some of the joint income of this church and its six pendicle chapels of Drumblade, Dyce, Kemnay, Kinnellar, Kintore and Skene although it is also recorded as an independent parsonage in this time frame	In the period before his official translation to Aberdeen, Bishop Henry de Lychtone of Moray arranged for the appropriation of the church and chapels, including both the parsonage and vicarage, into a prebend of Aberdeen cathedral in 1420.	This annexation of the church and chapels ended the association with Hospitallers. The cure was provided by vicars pensioner at Kinkell and its pendicles
Kinnethmont	5	David, Earl of Huntingdon (1191 x 95) granted the church to Lindores Abbey and was confirmed to the uses of the abbey by Pope Celestine III in 1195. The church of Rathmuriel was joined to it before the Reformation	The parsonage remained with the abbey	Ratification of the cure provision of a vicar perpetual was given in 1257
Kintore	15c	One of the six pendicle chapels of Kinkell church.	See Kinkell	See Kinkell
Leslie	6	Norman, son of Malcolm of Leslie granted the church to Lindores Abbey and confirmed by David, Earl of Huntingdon	The parsonage remained with the abbey	Ratification of the cure provision of a vicar perpetual was given in 1257
Logie-Durno	11	Also known as Durnach. David, Earl of Huntingdon (1191 x 95) granted the church to Lindores Abbey and was confirmed to the uses of the abbey by Pope Celestine III in 1195	The parsonage remained with the abbey	Ratification of the cure provision of a vicar perpetual was given in 1257
Monkegie	14a	David, Earl of Huntingdon (1191 x 95) granted the church to Lindores Abbey and was confirmed to the uses of the abbey by Pope Celestine III in 1195. See Inverurie	See Inverurie	Vicarage status unknown
Oyne	10	This church was confirmed to the Bishop Edward of Aberdeen in 1163.	On or before 1256, the church was appropriated as a prebend of Aberdeen Cathedral with both the parsonage and vicarage being annexed and remained so at the Reformation. It is possible that the annexation was implemented by Bishop Peter Ramsey (1247–56)	The cure was provided by a vicar pensionary
Premnay	9	David, Earl of Huntingdon (1191 x 95) granted the church to Lindores Abbey and was confirmed to the uses of the abbey by Pope Celestine III in 1195	The parsonage remained with the abbey	Ratification of the cure provision of a vicar perpetual was given in 1257
Rathmuriel	7	Also known as Christ's Kirk, David, Earl of Huntingdon (1191 x 95) granted the church to Lindores Abbey and was confirmed to the uses of the abbey by Pope Celestine III in 1195 with the parsonage remaining with the abbey. At some point before the Reformation, the church had been downgraded to a chapel of Kinnethmont	The parsonage remained with the abbey	Ratification of the cure provision of a vicar perpetual was given in 1257
Rayne	4	The bishop of Aberdeen received papal confirmation of the Church in 1157	On or before 1256, the church was appropriated to the prebend of the archdeacon with both the parsonage and the vicarage	The cure was served by a vicar pensioner
Skene	15f	One of the six pendicle chapels of Kinkell church.	See Kinkell	See Kinkell
Tullynestle	18	The bishop of Aberdeen received papal confirmation of the Church in 1157. The parsonage remained with the cathedral while the vicarage was annexed to King's College during Bishop William Elphinstone's episcopate between 1494/5 and 1513	Only the patronage of this church remained with the bishops of Aberdeen until it was erected into a prebend of the cathedral by Bishop Alexander in 1376. The parsonage remained with the cathedral while the now enhanced vicarage was annexed to King's College during Bishop William Elphinstone's episcopate between 1494/5 and 1513	The status of the vicar providing the cure is unknown

=== Mar ===
Dean of Christianity first recorded date: 1240 x 1247

Parish	Map reference	Foundation / confirmation	Appropriation	Cure of souls
Abergerny	22a	Also known as Abergairn and Glengairn. See Glenmuick	See Glenmuick	See Glenmuick
Aboyne	28	Also known as Oboyne, it was confirmed to the uses of the Knights Templar at Culter in c. 1240 by Bishop Radulf of Aberdeen after a grant by Walter Byset.	Following the suppression of Templars, it was provided to the Knights Hospitallers (St John) c. 1314 along with the parsonage	The vicarage settlement is unknown
Alford	11	Bishop John of Aberdeen (1199 x 1207) confirmed the church to the uses of Monymusk Priory following the grant by Gilchrist, Earl of Mar. Regranted by Thomas Durward before 1228.	The parsonage remained with the priory	The cure was provided by a vicar perpetual
Auchindoir	4	Also known as Davachyndore, Thomas, Earl of Mar, in a writ of 1361, gave over to his clerk Sir John of Mar the uses of the church. In the writ, Thomas agreed to the church being joined with the prebend of Invernochty because of the poverty of Auchindoir.	This remained the situation until its disjuncture with Invernochty in 1514 and became a prebend of King's College, Aberdeen retaining both the parsonage and vicarage	The cure was provided by a vicar pensioner
Birse	30	Also known as Brass, the bishop of Aberdeen received papal confirmation of the Church in 1157.	Parsonage and vicarage annexed as a prebend of the Chancellor. As such it remained.	The vicar's status is unknown, but his earnings were met from both the parsonage and vicarage
Cabrach	3	Also known as Cloveth and Strathdeveron. One of the five churches belonging to the Celi Dei church of Mortlach. The bishop of Aberdeen received papal confirmation of the Church in 1157. It remained a mensal church until 1266 when Bishop Richard granted it as a common church to the cathedral.	It was united with the church of Kildrummy in 1363. The united parsonages and vicarages remained with the cathedral	the united cure was provided by vicar pensioner
Colstone	24	Isabella de Douglas granted the church to Lindores Abbey in 1402 but this appears to have been unsuccessful	Parsonage appropriated as a prebend of Aberdeen by Bishop Henry de Lychtone in 1424	The cure was served by a vicar perpetual
Clatt	5	The bishop of Aberdeen received papal confirmation of the Church in 1157.	Remained as a mensal church but by 1256 it had become a prebend of the cathedral and retained the parsonage and vicarage	The cure was served by a vicar pensioner
Cluny	29a	This was a pendicle chapel of the Church of Kincardine O'Neil but was provided to the hospital of Kincardine O'Neil by its patron Alan Durward in 1233–4. Duncan, Earl of Five consented to the hospital and its pertinents becoming a prebend of the cathedral in 1330. This was confirmed by Bishop Alexander. At the Reformation, both the parsonage and the vicarage were in the possession of the prebend	The patronage of Cluny moved to William, Earl of Sutherland and his spouse in 1346. At some point, the patronage had gone to the prebend as it was fulfilling this function in the 16th century with the consent of the crown which by this time was exercising patronage over the church of Kincarden O'Neil	The cure was being served by a curate at the Reformation
Coul	27	Arbroath Abbey received the grant of the church from Willam the Lion, 1189 x 99, while the uses were confirmed to the abbey by Bishop John, 1199 x 1207	The parsonage continued with the abbey	A vicar perpetual provided the cure
Crathie	21	The Bagimond roll recorded the church as independent (late 13th century)	By 1347, Cambuskenneth Abbey had the income of both the parsonage and vicarage	The cure was served by removable chaplain
Cushnie	16	An independent church in Bagimands Roll	In the 15th century, the patronage lay with the earls of Rothes	As a parsonage, the cure provision may have been provided by the parson, or an employed vicar
Dalmeath	2	The church is evident in a faked grant to the monastery of Mortlach dated 1062. The monastery was confirmed to the bishop of Aberdeen along with its five attendant churches in 1157 in a papal bull.	The church seems to have remained with the bishop until 1266 when Bishop Richard granted it as a joint holding of the cathedral. The parsonage and the vicarage were annexed as before	The cure was served by a chaplain
Echt	31	Provided to Scone Abbey by Thomas, son of Malcolm de Lunden, 1214 x 25 and confirmed by Pope Honorius III in 1225.	The abbey retained the parsonage	The cure was provided by a vicar perpetual
Fetterneir	15	The bishop of Aberdeen received papal confirmation of the church in 1157	Although the church remained as a mensal possession of the bishop it was often provided, ad vitam (for life), as a prebend to dispense a pension but financed from the bishopric income	The vicarage status is unknown
Forbes	10	Created, together with its chapel of Kearn, as a prebend of Aberdeen Cathedral in 1325. It was still as such in 1329 and so remained.	The parsonage and vicarage were annexed but the patronage remained with lords of Forbes	The cure was provided by a vicar pensionary
Glenbuchat	7	A former chapel of Logie-Mar, the church gained parochial status in 1470.	The parsonage and vicarage remained with the chapter of Aberdeen Cathedral in accordance with its former chaplaincy of Logie-Mar	The chaplain (later, vicar) was to be sustained by payment from the vicarage and the vicar pensionary of Logie-Mar
Glenmuick	22	Originally a parish church with its attendant chapel of Abergerny (see above), they were appropriated to the Hospital of St Germains in Lothian by 1418. While it is likely to have been a possession since the hospital's foundation by the Knights of St John of Jerusalem (Hospitallers) in the early 13th century, the hospitallers held the patronage of the church and its chapel as early as Bishop Mathew's episcopate (1172–99).	The church's resident cleric had to pay a pension to the order in England before it and the chapel, with the fruits of the hospital, were annexed to King's College, Aberdeen in 1497. This annexation included the parsonage and vicarage which had their proceeds re-allocated in 1505 and again in 1531	The cure was served by a vicar pensionary
Glentannar	29b	This church does not appear until the 16th century but it is almost certainly one of the pendicle chapels of Kincardine O'Neil since 1233/4	Its first notice confirms that the parsonage and vicarage were annexed to the church of Kincardine O'Neil which in its turn with all its pendicles to the new hospital Of Kincardine O'Neil (founded after 1244). Remained attached to the church of Kincardine O'Neil when it was annexed as a prebend of Aberdeen cathedral and continued likewise, thereafter	Details of vicarage status is unknown
Invernochtie	6	Gilchrist, earl of Mar granted the church to the priory of Monymusk c.1200 and confirmed by Bishop John before 1207, but the grant proved ineffective and it remained as an independent parsonage until 1356	Bishop Alexander de Kyninmund erected the church as a prebend of the cathedral in 1356 and was united with Auchindoir (see above) in 1361 due to the latter's poverty	A vicar pensioner provided the cure
Keig	12	Bishop William Malvoison of St Andrews (1202–36) granted the church to Monymusk Priory which was confirmed by Bishop Gilbert de Stirling of Aberdeen (1228–39)	The parsonage and vicarage were annexed at the Reformation	The cure of souls was provided by a vicar pensioner
Kearn	10a	This was a chapel that belonged to the church of Forbes and as such, became a prebend of Aberdeen cathedral in 1325	The parsonage and vicarage were both annexed while the lords of Forbes retained the patronage	A vicar pensioner provided the cure
Kildrummy	9	Thomas, Earl of Mar granted the church to the dean and chapter of Aberdeen to be held in common in 1362.	It united with the church of Cabrach in 1363 which had been erected as a common church in 1266 (see Cabrach, above). The revenues of both the parsonage and vicarage remained within the chapter	The single cure was delivered by a vicar pensioner
Kinbathoch	8	Also known as Kinbettack or Kilbarcha.	At the Reformation, the parsonage was in the possession of the Knights of St John of Jerusalem. This would signify that the previous annexation had been to the Knights Templar and passed to the Knights of St John on the suppression of the Templar order in c. 1309	The vicarage remained at the church and the cure was provided by a vicar perpetual
Kincardine O’Neil	29	Alan Durward granted the church and its pendicle chapels of Glentanner, Lumphanan, Cluny and Midmar to the hospital of Kincardine O’Neil before 1231. The grant was confirmed in 1250. Cluny and Midmar may have passed to the hospital separately from the others as they were being ministered by vicars in 1274	Duncan, Earl of Fife agreed to the annexation of the hospital, church and pendicles being provided as a prebend of Aberdeen cathedral in 1330. A further annexation was made in 1501 of the vestigial fruits of the benefice to the Chapel Royal of Stirling but apparently was ineffective. A canon of the cathedral continued to hold the parsonage and vicarage rights of the four chapels and the parsonage of the mother church	The vicarage remained with the church of Kincardine O’Neil and a vicar perpetual administered the cure
Kindrocht	20	Duncan, Earl of Mar (1214–34) granted the church to Monymusk Priory. Bishop Gilbert of Aberdeen (1228–39) confirmed the church and its teinds to the canons of Monymusk	The parsonage and vicarage were thus annexed and remained as such at the Reformation	The vicarage status is unknown
Kinerny	18	Thomas de Lundyn (1204 X 11) granted the church to Arbroath Abbey and confirmed to the uses of the abbey by Bishop Adam of Aberdeen (1207 x 1228)	The parsonage remained with the abbey	The vicarage was confirmed to the church by 1250 and the cure was provided by a vicar perpetual
Leochel	17	Gilchrist, earl of Mar (1170 x 1204) granted the church to the Culdee church of St Mary of Monymusk and was confirmed by Bishop John (1199 x 1207) and by Pope Innocent IV to the priory of Monymusk in 1245	Apparently, the parsonage and the vicarage had been annexed to the priory and remained as such at the Reformation	The cure was provided by a curate
Logie-Mar	25	Also known as Logie-Ruthven, Gilchrist, earl of Mar (1170 x 1204) granted the church to the Culdee church of St Mary of Monymusk and was confirmed by Bishop John (1199 x 1207). It seems to have been unsuccessful as Duncan, Earl of Mar (1239 x 1241) granted the church and its chapel of Glenbuchat (although it achieved parochial status in 1470) to the common use of the chapter of Aberdeen cathedral	The parsonage and the vicarage remained annexed thereafter, but see Glenbuchat above	The cure of souls was provided by a vicar pensioner
Lumphanan	29d	See Kincarden O'Neil	See Kincarden O'Neil	The cure was served by a Vicar pensioner
Midmar	29c	See Kincarden O'Neil	See Kincarden O'Neil	The cure was served by a vicar pensioner
Migvie	19	Moregrund, earl of Mar (1153 x 78) and his wife, Agnes provided the church to the abbey of St Andrews and confirmed by Bishop Mathew of Aberdeen (1172 X 99) and by Pope Lucius III in 1183	The parsonage was annexed to the abbey and remained as such	The vicarage remained with the church and the cure was served by a vicar perpetual
Monymusk	14	Seemingly the church of Monymusk, despite its proximity, had no association with the priory of Monymusk. The bishop of St Andrews owned the vill of Monymusk and therefore had patronage rights over the church.	It was in that role that the bishop of St Andrews consented to the annexation of the church to a prebendary of Aberdeen cathedral in 1445 even though the actual event had happened in 1437. The annexation was for both the parsonage and the vicarage	The cure was served by a vicar pensioner or a curate
Mortlach	1	This was one of the churches involved in a faked grant to a bishopric of Mortlach in 1063. Its existence is corroborated by the bull of 1157 confirming it to the bishop of Aberdeen	On or before 1256 during Bishop Peter Ramsey's episcopate (1247–56), the church was annexed to Aberdeen cathedral as it remained thereafter. The annexation was of both parsonage and vicarage	The cure was served by a vicar pensioner
Tarland	26	Moregrund, earl of Mar (1165 x 1171) granted the church to St Andrews priory and confirmed by Bishop Edward of Aberdeen and by succeeding pontiffs. At the Reformation, the church eas united with Migvie	The parsonage remained with the priory	The vicarage remained with the church and the cure served by a vicar perpetual
Tough	13	Also known as Tulich (not to be confused with Tullich),	This was an independent parsonage in Bagimond but appears as a prebend of Aberdeen cathedral in 1438 so must have been a short-term ad vitam arrangement. After that, it retained its independent parsonage status and the patronage resided with the earls of Huntly from the middle of the 15th century, if not before	the cure arrangement is unknown
Tullich	23	The church often appeared in conjunction with Aboyne and could have been a chapel of that church and could account for its omission from the Bagimond Roll of 1274. If that was so, then Tullich and Aboyne would have been granted to the Knights Templar of Culter from the original grant of Walter Byset. Ownership would then have passed to the Knights of St John of Jerusalem following the suppression of that order c. 1314.	This scenario seems to have been the course of events as the Hospitallers did possess the parsonage in the 16th century	The cure was exercised by a vicar perpetual

== Sources ==
- "Search Canmore". Canmore: Part of Historic Environment Scotland.
- Cowan, Ian B. (1961). "The Development of the Parochial System in Medieval Scotland" (PDF). The Scottish Historical Review. 40 (129): 43–55. JSTOR 25526631. "2022-07-14"
- Cowan, Ian B. (1967). The Parishes of Medieval Scotland. Edinburgh: Scottish Record Society, Vol. 93.
- Cowan, Ian B.; Eason, David E. (1976). Medieval Religious Houses of Scotland (2 ed.). London: Longman Group Limited. ISBN 0582120691.
- "Deskford Church: Statement of Significance" (PDF). Historic Environment Scotland. 2019.
- Dowden, John (1910). The Medieval Church in Scotland. Glasgow: Maclehose.
- Watt, D. E. R.; Murray, A. L. (2003). Fasti Ecclesiae Scoticanae Medii Aevi Ad Annum 1638. Vol. 25 (New Series ed.). The Scottish Record Society. ISBN 0-902054-19-8.
