= David of Ashby =

David of Ashby (fl. 1260 – 1275) was an English-born Dominican friar who was sent from the Holy Land city of Acre to the Mongol ruler Hulagu in 1260, by the Papal legate Tommaso Agni. He stayed around 15 years among the Mongols, and only returned from Iran in 1274.

David of Ashby was a member of the Mongol embassy to the Second Council of Lyon in 1274, sent by Abaqa. The embassy arrived on 5 July 1274. David was accompanied by the clerk Rychaldus, in the service of the Mongols, and 14 Mongol dignitaries. The leader of the Mongols underwent baptism on this occasion, on 16 July.

David of Ashby wrote a book Les fais des Tatars ("The facts about the Tartars") describing the culture of the Mongols, mainly in Iran under Abaqa Khan, and their remarkable military organization and discipline. A manuscript remained, but it disappeared in the fire of the Turin National Library in 1904. Its only remains are in the Notice et extraits of Auguste Scheler in 1867.

== See also ==
- Franco-Mongol alliance
