= Rychaldus =

13th century Mongol diplomat, clerk and translator

Rychaldus, Richaldus or Richardus (13th century) was a clerk and translator (notarius...ac interpreters Latinorum) for the Mongol Ilkhanate rulers Hulagu Khan, and then Hulagu's son Abaqa Khan. He was best known for delivering a report on behalf of the Mongols at the 1274 Second Council of Lyon.

== Biography ==
Little is known of Rychaldus, except that he was a part of some Mongol embassies to European rulers. There are different mentions of a "Richaldus" in the Mongol court, and it is generally assumed by modern historians that they refer to the same individual, but it is not certain.

In 1262, a Rychaldus was known to have been accompanying an aborted Mongol embassy sent by Hulagu, which was intercepted by an ally of the Egyptian Mamluks, King Manfred of Sicily. Manfred was in conflict with Pope Urban IV, and Rychaldus was returned to the Mongols by ship.

Another mention was made of Richardus, a Latin secretary in the Ilkhan's court, in 1267. The reference there said that because of his absence, the Ilkhan's chancery had been unable to craft a reply in Latin.

== Second Council of Lyon ==
The name Rychaldus is best known for being a member of the Mongol embassy to the Second Council of Lyon in 1274, sent by Abaqa, together with the Dominican missionary David of Ashby.

The embassy arrived in Lyon on July 4, 1274. At the Council, Rychaldus delivered a report which outlined previous European-Ilkhanid relations under Abaqa's father, Hulagu. Rychaldus described how Hulagu had been a friend of the Christians, and that his son Abaqa was interested in continuing Hulagu's policies, and driving the Mamluks out of Syria. Rychaldus also talked of how Hulagu had "remitted Jerusalem to the Christians during his 1260 campaign in Syria", though this was doubtless propaganda, as no such event was recorded by any other sources.

Nothing is known of Rychaldus after the Council of Lyon.

== See also ==
- Franco-Mongol alliance
- Mongol raids into Palestine
- Mongol invasions of Syria
