= Diocese of Belgorod =

Diocese of Belgorod and Stary Oskol
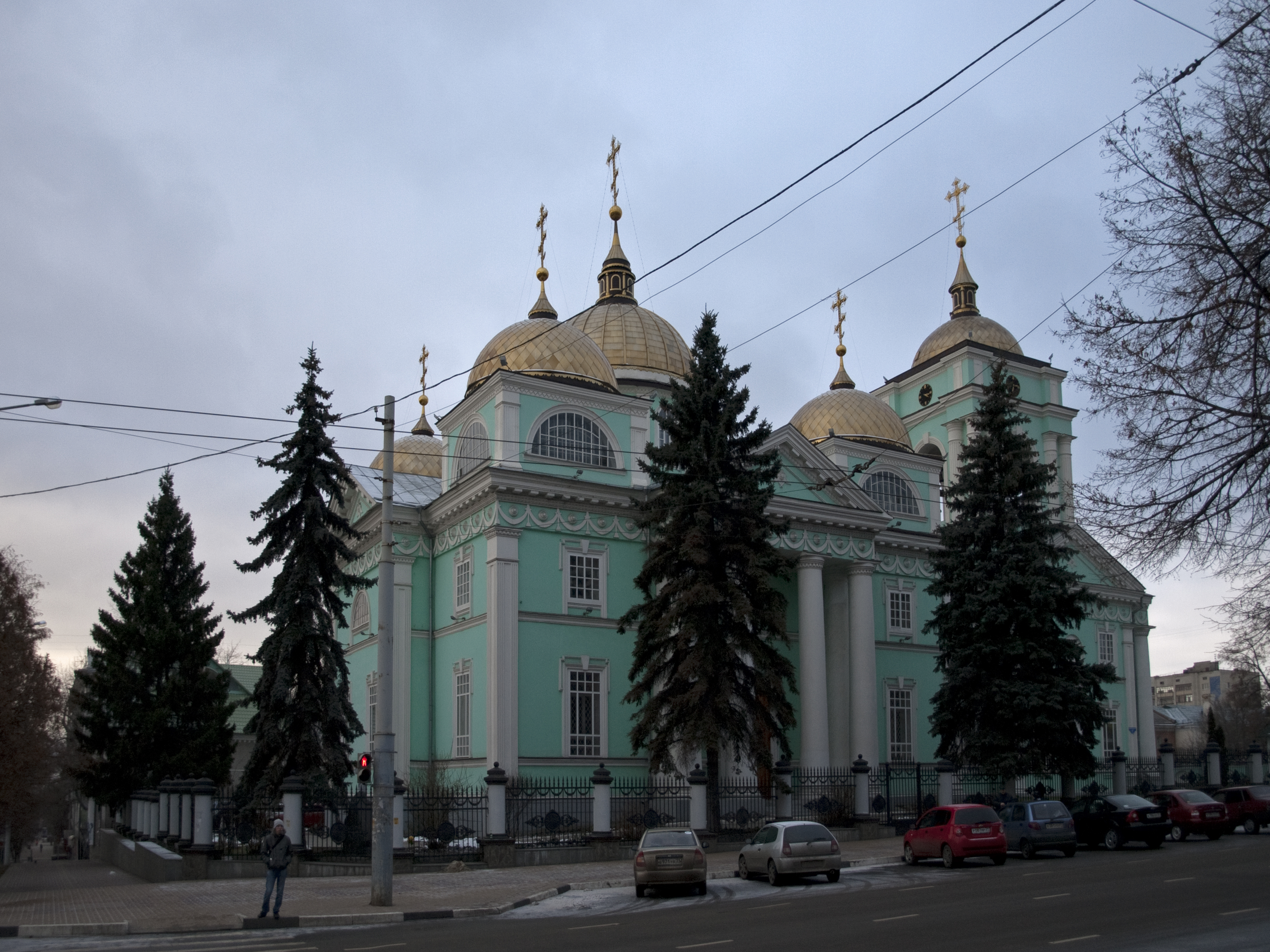
- Transfiguration Cathedral

Location
- Headquarters: Belgorod

Information
- Denomination: Eastern Orthodox
- Sui iuris church: Russian Orthodox Church
- Established: 1657
- Language: Old Church Slavonic
- Governance: Eparchy

Website
- www.beleparh.ru

The Diocese of Belgorod and Stary Oskol (Russian: Белгородская и Старооскольская епархия) is an eparchy of the Russian Orthodox Church.

== History ==
The bishop of Belgorod c. 1244 was a certain Peter who served as vicar of the vacant metropolitanate of Kiev between late 1240 and 1246. He attended the First Council of Lyon, perhaps to discuss a union of the churches, and answered questions concerning the Mongols that are recorded in the Tractatus de ortu Tartarorum.

The history of the diocese of Belgorod formally begins with 1657, when it was "discovered" the Chair and Metropolitan Pitirim Krutitskii received the title of Metropolitan of Belgorod but did not go to Belgorod, since the appointment was to "banish dangerous for Nikon Metropolitan" from Moscow, where he was a patriarchal vicar, on the outskirts, because the diocese in the year really organized and has not been. Reasons for the binding of the Belgorod region to krutitskoy Metropolis was: her territory once included the Golden-Sarskaya (Sarskaja, Podonskuyu) Bishop, which was once part (southern part) consisted of Belgorod and Sloboda.

Belgorod Diocese was actually formed (spun off from the Patriarchal area) only in 1667 with the appointment of the chair of the Serbian Metropolitan Theodosius.

In 1667, by order of the Grand Moscow cathedral for the immediate and more successful pastoral care of the remote border regions of Russia, as long depended on the spiritual part of the management of Moscow, part of Kiev, was established in Belgorod Diocese: "Let there be customs bishop." Since the founding of the diocese was staged in a number of metropolitan sees and its bishops were called Metropolitans Belogradsky and Oboyansky - so it was prior to the establishment in 1721, the Holy Synod. Since that time, they are called bishops or archbishops, with the exception of one Anthony ChernavskiT ordained in the Metropolitan at home.

From 1667 to 1787 years were called arhipastyri Belogradsky Oboyansky and, from 1787 to 1799 Belgorod and Kursk, and since 1799 - Kursk and Belgorod.

The territory of the newly formed Diocese was "very high", - more than 10 times larger in area than in 2012, for the last time the diocese was divided several times. In 1667, the diocese was "open" to the south (i.e., had the southern border, including the then inhabited the entire Russian territory) and included 37 cities (20 "old", north of Belgorod features, chief of Belgorod, and 17 "new", that is newly constructed, mainly in Slobozhanschyna, chief Kharkov) and in 1679 in the diocese already had 542 churches.

Only during the 16th and 17th centuries in the future of the Belgorod province there 59 monasteries, including such well-known men like Kharkov Svyatogorskaya deserts in honor of the Assumption of the Blessed Virgin, Hotmyzhsky monastery in honor of the Blessed Virgin "The Omen", Glinskaya deserts.

Monasteries in the Belgorod region appeared simultaneously with the addition of it to the territory of the Russian state and the period of its origin belonged to the marginal, playing a significant role in strengthening Christianity and state power in the newly attached vast territory. Therefore, in the 16th century by order of Tsar Feodor Ivanovich based Root Hermitage (Kursk county), Trinity Monastery in Belgorod - on the orders of Boris Godunov.

In 1722 were established systematic theological schools, according to the educational level had no parallel at that time in Russia. By 1727 of 46 schools that existed in the 21 dioceses, 8 had the Belgorod region. Belgorod school has successfully developed the Kharkov Collegium, which, according to contemporaries, was "one of the most remarkable religious schools" 18th century.

By the middle of the 18th century, in the diocese acted in 31 monasteries. Belgorod diocese bordered on the Metropolitan of Kiev and the Kiev diocese within the province in the west and south-west to the east within the Azov province it coexisted with the Voronezh diocese in the upper basin of the Don. In this part Belgorod Diocese existed until the last quarter of the 18th century.

Belgorod Diocese of reform in 1764 was attributed to the third class. In monasteries selected their ancestral lands, and for the maintenance of monasteries appointed staff salaries for three classes. Bezvotchinnye monasteries or abolished, or were left "at his own expense." As a result of secularization in the diocese has been a tremendous reduction in the number of monasteries and monks. As an exception to Count PB Sheremetev managed to defend Bogoroditskoe deserts Tikhvin, probably only because it contained a purely "Dependent" of the graph.

May 6, 1788 Holy Synod issued a total nominal decree of the division of dioceses accordance with the division of the provinces, and in 1799 from the Diocese of isolated self-Ukrainian Suburban (otherwise Sloboda and Kharkiv) Diocese of the center in Kharkov (later renamed to Kharkiv and Akhtyrskaya) Belgorod and renamed the Diocese of Kursk and Belgorod, but before the 1833 diocesan institutions and management remained in Belgorod.

Resolution of the Holy Synod of the Russian Orthodox Church on July 18, 1995 has been restored within the Department of Belgorod Oblast.

June 7, 2012 from the Diocese of Belgorod were isolated and Valuyskaya Gubkinskaya diocese with their inclusion in the Metropolitan of Belgorod.

=== Former bishops ===
Diocese of Belograd and Oboyan

  - Pitirim (1657) has not entered into management
  - Theodosius (1666 - 20 August 1671)
  - Misael (14 September 1671 - 23 February 1684)
  - Abraham (Yukhov) (July 13, 1684 - August 6, 1702)
  - Justin (Bazilevich) (1702 - August 17, 1709)
  - Hilarion (Vlastelinsky) (March 11, 1711 - April 4, 1720)
  - Epiphanius (Tikhorsky) (July 9, 1722 - July 2, 1731)
  - Dositheus (Bogdanovic-Lyubimsky) (28 November 1731 – 1735)
  - Arsenius (Berlo) (September 30, 1735 - January 3, 1736)
  - Peter (Smelich) (June 20, 1736 - September 16, 1742)
  - Anthony (Chernovsky) (September 6, 1742 - January 1, 1748)
  - Joasaph (Gorlenko) (June 2, 1748 - December 10, 1754)
  - Luke (Konashevich) (October 9, 1755 - January 1, 1758)
  - Josaphat (Mitkevich) (April 26, 1758 - June 3, 1768)
  - Porphyry (Kreisky) (October 29, 1763 - July 7, 1768)
  - Samuel (Mislavsky) (December 28, 1768 - September 24, 1771)
  - Haggai (Kolosovsky) (February 9, 1774 - November 28, 1786)
  - Anthony (Rumovskii) (28 November 1786) - For the death was not

Diocese of Belgorod and Kursk

  - Theoctistus (Mochulski) (9 February 1787 - 15 September 1801)
  - Joannicius (Yefremov) (3 June 1905 - 15 November 1913)
  - Nicodemus (Kononov) (November 15, 1913 - September 3, 1918)
  - Apollinarius (Mishka) (11 June 1919 – 1921 (since 1920 in exile))
  - Nikon (Purlevsky) (1921-1923, 1924-1925)
  - Eugene (Zernov) (13 August 1930 - August 1930)
  - Innocent (Klodetsky) (14 June - 30 December 1931)
  - Onuphrius (Gagalyuk) (11 August 1933 - 22 November 1933)
  - Anthony (Pankeyev) (22 November 1933 - August 1934)

Diocese of Belgorod and Graivoron

  - Pankratus (Gladkov) (22 June 1942 – 1943)

Vicariate of Belgorod of Diocese of Kursk

  - John (Popov) (4 April 1993 - 18 July 1995)

Diocese of Belgorod and Stary Oskol

  - John (Popov) (c 18 July 1995)

== See also ==
- Russian Orthodox Church
- Eparchies and Metropolitanates of the Russian Orthodox Church

== Bibliography ==
- Jackson, Peter (2016). "The Testimony of the Russian 'Archbishop' Peter Concerning the Mongols (1244/5): Precious Intelligence or Timely Disinformation?". Journal of the Royal Asiatic Society. 26 (1–2): 65–77. doi:10.1017/s135618631500084x.
- Maiorov, Alexander V. (2019). "The Rus Archbishop Peter at the First Council of Lyon". The Journal of Ecclesiastical History. 71 (1): 1–20. doi:10.1017/s0022046919001143.
