= William of Tripoli =

Dominican friar

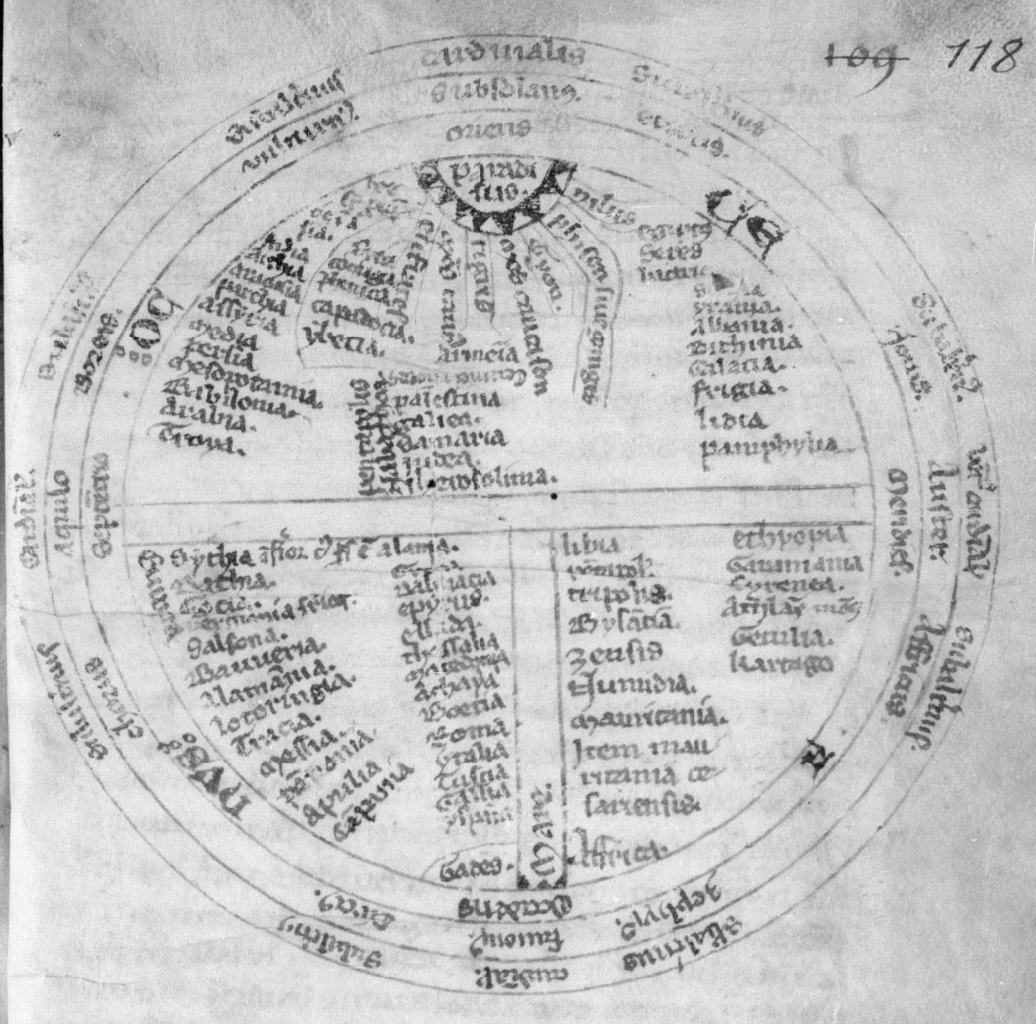
T and O map attributed to William as part of his De statu Saracenorum. From a fourteenth-century manuscript.

William of Tripoli (fl. 1254–1273) was a Dominican friar active as a missionary and papal nuncio in the Holy Land. He wrote two works about Islam, towards which he displayed an unusually irenic attitude for his time.

== Life ==
There is little surviving information from which to reconstruct William's biography, and much of the information that is available is not credible. He was born in the first third of the thirteenth century, most likely in the 1220s. The Latin name associated with his works, Guillelmus Tripolitanus (William the Tripolitan), suggests that he was born in Tripoli in the County of Tripoli. He was most likely of French or Italian descent. He probably learned Arabic from a relatively early age.

It is unknown when William entered the Dominican Order. In his works, he refers to himself as "of the priory in Acre of the Order of Preachers". He may have first joined that of Tripoli before joining that of Acre. Following Sultan Baybars's invasion of the Kingdom of Jerusalem in 1263, William travelled to Rome to inform Pope Urban IV of the poor state of the kingdom's defences, especially at Jaffa. He also reported that monies promised, including by King Louis IX of France, had not been received. In 1264, Urban issued three bulls—one to Louis IX and two to John of Valenciennes—that refer to William as the pope's "dear son" and identify him as a friar from Acre. According to Urban, both Louis and John knew William. Louis probably met him during his stay in the Holy Land between 1250 and 1254.

Urban sent William back to the Holy Land as his nuncio (nuntius) to raise money there. He praises William for "working for the benefit of the [Holy L]and, exposing his own person to dangers on land and sea."

William died after 1273. A surviving list of Dominicans of the priory of Acre from 1280 does not include his name, suggesting that he had by then died. A seventeenth-century source lists him under 19 January, implying that he died on that day.

== Works ==
Two works in Latin are attributed to William:

- Notitia de Machometo ('Information concerning Muḥammad')
- De statu Saracenorum ('On the realm of the Saracens')

Written around 1271, the Notitia is only 33 pages long in a modern edition. It was written for Tedaldo Visconti, the future Pope Gregory X, whom William met in Acre shortly after Louis IX's failed crusade against Tunis in 1270. It consists of a prologue and 15 sections. In the prologue, William outlines three purposes: to describe who Muḥammad was and the early Muslim conquests; to describe the Qurʾān, its origin and author or compiler; and to describe the teachings of the Qurʾān and what it says about Christianity. The final three sections, in which William describes the Islamic world, the caliphates and certain Islamic practices, are not covered by the scheme outlined in the prologue. The Notitia refers to a Qurʾānic prophecy that foretells the imminent fall of Islam. Therefore, William argues, missionaries rather than crusaders are needed for bringing about the recovery of the Holy Land. The Notitia survives in three manuscripts, all from the fifteenth century.

Written in 1273, De statu is 53 pages long in a modern edition. It is also divided into three parts and consists of a prologue and 55 sections. The first part is a biography of Muḥammad with an emphasis on the role of Baḥīrā. The second is description of the Muslim conquests. The third is about the Qurʾān. It ends with arguments for the Trinity and the Incarnation based on the Qurʾān. For its emphasis on conversion of Muslims, it has been called "a handbook for the Christian missionary on the history, law and beliefs of Islam." It may have been written in response to Pope Gregory X's bull Dudum super generalis (11 March 1273), which asked for information on all the infidels that threatened Christendom. De statu survives in twelve manuscripts plus the Courtenay Compendium.

William's authorship of De statu has been questioned, with some scholars seeing it as a revised and expanded version of his Notitia, and probably the work of somebody else. John Tolan calls the anonymous author "pseudo-William of Tripoli".

=== Editions ===
- Wilhelm von Tripolis (1992). Engels, Peter (ed.). Notitia de Machometo. De statu Sarracenorum. Corpus Islamo-Christianum: Series Latina, 4. Würzburg: Echter.
