= First Council of Lyon =

Thirteenth ecumenical council (1245)

- Date: 1245
- Accepted by: Catholic Church
- Previous council: Fourth Council of the Lateran
- Next council: Second Council of Lyon
- Convoked by: Pope Innocent IV
- President: Pope Innocent IV
- Attendance: 250
- Topics: Emperor Frederick II, clerical discipline, Crusades, Great Schism
- Documents and statements: thirty-eight constitutions, deposition of Frederick, Seventh Crusade, red hat for cardinals, levy for the Holy Land

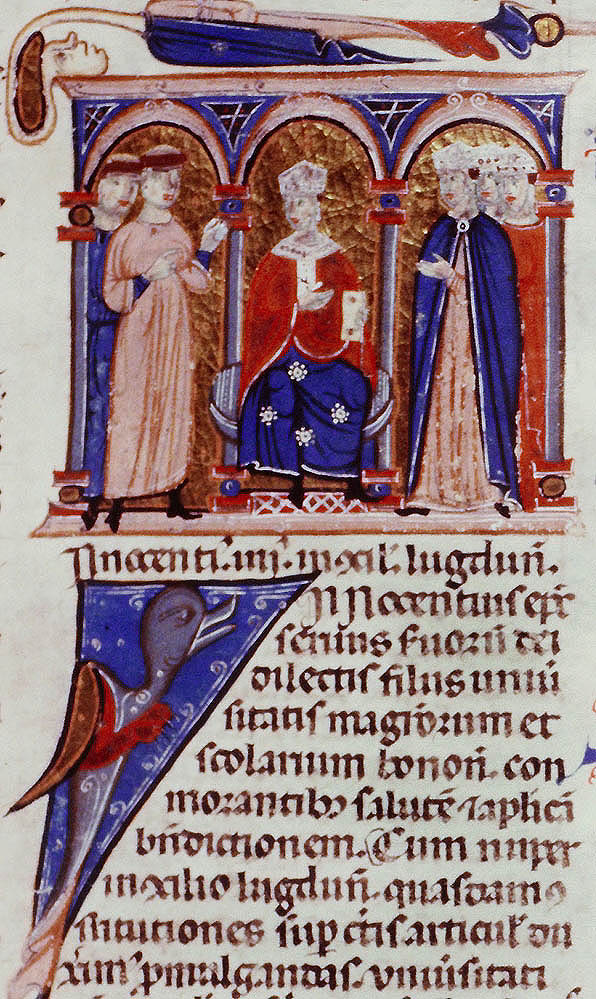
Innocent IV – Council of Lyon

The First Council of Lyon (Lyon I) was the thirteenth ecumenical council, as numbered by the Catholic Church and took place in 1245. It was the first ecumenical council to be held outside Rome's Lateran Palace after the Great Schism of 1054.

== Proceedings ==
The First General Council of Lyon was presided over by Pope Innocent IV, who, threatened by Holy Roman Emperor Frederick II, arrived at Lyon on 2 December 1244, Early the following year, he summoned the Church's bishops to the council for later that same year. Some 250 prelates responded, including the Latin patriarchs of Constantinople, Antioch, and Aquileia and 140 bishops. Latin Emperor Baldwin II of Constantinople, Counts Raymond VII of Toulouse and Raymond Berenguer IV of Provence were among those who participated. With Rome under siege by Emperor Frederick II, the pope used the council to excommunicate and depose the emperor with Ad Apostolicae Dignitatis Apicem, as well as the King Sancho II of Portugal. The council also directed a new crusade (the Seventh Crusade), under the command of King Louis IX of France, to reconquer the Holy Land.

At the opening, on 28 June, after the singing of the Veni Creator Spiritus, Innocent IV preached on the subject of the five wounds of the Church and compared them to his own five sorrows: (1) the poor behaviour of both clergy and laity, (2) the insolence of the Saracens who occupied the Holy Land, (3) the Great East-West Schism, (4) the cruelties of the Tatars in Hungary and (5) the persecution of the Church by the Emperor Frederick.

The Council of Lyon was rather poorly attended. Since the great majority of those bishops and archbishops present came from France, Italy and Spain, other countries, especially Germany, were but weakly represented. The ambassador of Frederick, Thaddaeus of Suessa, contested its ecumenicity in the assembly itself. In a letter, Innocent IV had urged Kaliman I of Bulgaria to send representatives. In the bull Cum simus super (25 March 1245), he also urged the Vlachs, Serbs, Alans, Georgians, Nubians, the Church of the East and all the other Eastern Christians not in union with Rome to send representatives. In the end, the only known non-Latin cleric present was Peter, the bishop of Belgorod and vicar of the metropolitanate of Kiev, who provided Innocent with intelligence on the Mongols prior to the council. His information, in the form of the Tractatus de ortu Tartarorum, circulated among attendees.

The condemnation of the emperor was a foregone conclusion. The objections of the ambassador, which were that the accused had not been regularly cited, the pope was plaintiff and judge in one, and therefore the whole process was anomalous, achieved as little success as his appeal to the future pontiff and to a truly ecumenical council.

At the second session on 5 July, the bishop of Calvi and a Spanish archbishop attacked the emperor's behaviour, and in a subsequent session on 17 July, Innocent pronounced the deposition of Frederick. The deposition was signed by one 150 bishops and the Dominicans and Franciscans were given the responsibility for its publication. However, Innocent IV did not possess the material means to enforce the decree.

The Council of Lyon promulgated several other purely disciplinary measures:

- It obliged the Cistercians to pay tithes.
- It approved the Rule of the Grandmontines.
- It decided the institution of the Octave of the Nativity of the Blessed Virgin.
- It prescribed that cardinals were to wear a red hat.
- It prepared thirty-eight constitutions, which were later inserted by Boniface VIII in his Decretals, the most important of which decreed a levy of a twentieth on every benefice for three years for the relief of the Holy Land.

Among those attending was Thomas Cantilupe, who was made a papal chaplain and given a dispensation to hold his benefices in plurality.

== Sources ==
- Addington, Larry H. (1994). The Patterns of War Through the Eighteenth Century. Indiana University Press. ISBN 978-0253205513.
- Ambler, S. T. (2017). Bishops in the Political Community of England, 1213–1272. Oxford University Press. ISBN 978-0198754022.
- Bellitto, Christopher M. (2002). The General Councils:A History of the Twenty-One Church Councils from Nicaea to Vatican II. Paulist Press. ISBN 978-0809140190.
- Biller, Peter (2000). The Measure of Multitude: Population in Medieval Thought. Oxford University Press. ISBN 978-0198206323.
- Dondorp, Hary; Schrage, Eltjo J.H. (2010). "The Sources of Medieval Learned Law". In Cairns, John W.; du Plessis, Paul J. (eds.). The Creation of the Ius Commune: From Casus to Regula. Vol. 7. Edinburgh University Press. ISBN 978-0748638970.
- Hefele, Karl Joseph von (1913). H. Leclercq (tr.). Histoire des conciles d'après les documents originaux. (in French and Latin). Vol V, part 2. Paris: Letouzey, 1913.
- Maiorov, Alexander V. (2019). "The Rus Archbishop Peter at the First Council of Lyon". The Journal of Ecclesiastical History. 71 (1): 1–20. doi:10.1017/s0022046919001143. S2CID 211652664..
- Martínez, H. Salvador (2010). Alfonso X, the Learned. Translated by Cisneros, Odile. Brill. ISBN 978-9004181472.
- Richardson, Carole M. (2019). "The Cardinal's Wardrobe". In Hollingsworth, Mary; Pattenden, Miles; Witte, Arnold (eds.). A Companion to the Early Modern Cardinal. Brill. pp. 535–556. ISBN 978-9004310964.
- Wolter, Hans; Holstein, Henri (1966). Histoire des conciles œcuméniques: Lyon I et Lyon II. (in French). Pars: Éditions de l'Orante, 1966.
