= Bagimonds Roll =

Bagimonds Roll was a roll used for taxation in Scotland. In 1274 the council of Lyons imposed a tax of a tenth part of all church revenues during the six following years for the relief of the Holy Land. In Scotland, Pope Gregory X, entrusted the collection of this tax to Master Boiamund (better known as Bagimund) de Vitia, a canon of Asti, whose roll of valuation formed the basis of ecclesiastical taxation for some centuries.

Boiamund proposed to assess the tax, not according to the old conventional valuation but on the true value of the benefices at the time of assessment. The clergy of Scotland objected to this innovation, and, having held a council at Perth in August 1275, prevailed upon Boiamund to return to Rome for the purpose of persuading the pope to accept the older method of taxation. The pope insisted upon the tax being collected according to the true value, and Boiamund returned to Scotland to superintend its collection.

A fragment of Bagimond's Roll in something very like its original form is preserved at Durham, and has been printed by James Raine in his Priory of Coldingham (Publications of the Surtees Society, vol. xii.). It gives the real values in one column and tenth parts in another column of each of the benefices in the archdeaconry of Lothian: The actual taxation to which this fragment refers was not the tenth collected by Boiamund but the tenth of all ecclesiastical property in England, Scotland, Wales and Ireland granted by Pope Nicholas IV to Edward I of England in the year 1288. The fragment should therefore be regarded as supplementary to the Taxatio Ecclesiastics Angliae et Walliae printed by the Record Commissioners in 1802. Although no contemporary copy of Bagimond's Roll is known to exist, at least three documents give particulars of the taxation of the Church of Scotland in the 16th century, which are based upon the original roll.
