= Second Council of Lyon =

14th ecumenical council of the Catholic Church (1272–74)

- Date: 1274
- Accepted by: Catholic Church
- Previous council: First Council of Lyon
- Next council: Council of Vienne
- Convoked by: Pope Gregory X
- President: Pope Gregory X
- Attendance: 560 (bishops and abbots)
- Topics: Conquest of the Holy Land, East–West Schism, filioque, papal conclaves
- Documents and statements: Approval of Dominicans and Franciscans, apparent resolution of the East–West Schism, tithe for the crusade, internal reforms

The Second Council of Lyon was the fourteenth ecumenical council of the Catholic Church, convoked on 31 March 1272 and convened in Lyon, Kingdom of Arles (in modern France), in 1274.

The main topics discussed at the council were the conquest of the Holy Land and the union of the Eastern and Western Churches. The first session took place on 7 May 1274 and was followed by five additional sessions on 18 May 1274, 4 or 7 June 1274, 6 July 1274, 16 July 1274, and 17 July 1274. By the end of the council, 31 constitutions were promulgated. In the second session, the fathers approved the decree Zelus fidei, which contained no juridical statutes but rather summed up constitutions about the perils of the Holy Land, the means for paying for a proposed crusade, the excommunication of pirates and corsairs and those who protected them or traded with them, a declaration of peace among Christians, a grant of an indulgence for those willing to go on crusade, restoration of communion with the Greeks, and the definition of the order and procedure to be observed in the council. The Greek delegates conceded on the issue of the Filioque (two words added to the Nicene Creed), and union was proclaimed. The council also recognised Rudolf of Hapsburg as King of the Romans over the claims of Alfonso X of Castile and ended the interregnum in the Holy Roman Empire.

== Council ==
Pope Gregory X presided over the council, called to act on a pledge by Byzantine emperor Michael VIII Palaiologos to reunite the Greek church with the Latin Church in an attempt to heal the Great Schism. The council was attended by about 300 bishops, 60 abbots and more than a thousand prelates or their procurators among whom were the representatives of the universities. Due to the great number of attendees, those who had come to Lyon without being specifically summoned were given "leave to depart with the blessing of God" and of the Pope. Among others who attended the council were James I of Aragon, the ambassador of the Emperor Michael VIII with members of the Greek clergy and the ambassadors of Abaqa Khan of the Ilkhanate. Thomas Aquinas had been summoned to the council, but died en route at Fossanova Abbey. Bonaventure was present at the first four sessions but died at Lyon on 15 July 1274. As at the First Council of Lyon, Thomas Cantilupe was an English attendee and a papal chaplain.

In addition to Aragon, which James represented in person, representatives of the kings of Germany, England, Scotland, France, Castile, Navarre and Sicily were present, with procurators also representing the kingdoms of Norway, Sweden, Hungary, Bohemia, Poland, and the "realm of Dacia". In the procedures to be observed in the council, for the first time, the nations appeared as represented elements in an ecclesiastical council, as they had already become represented in the governing of medieval universities. That innovation marks a stepping-stone towards the acknowledgment of coherent ideas of nationhood, which were in the process of creating the European nation-states.

=== Union of churches ===
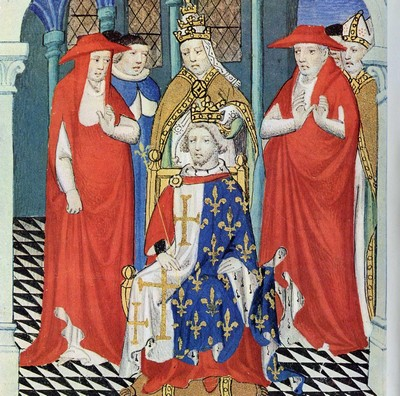
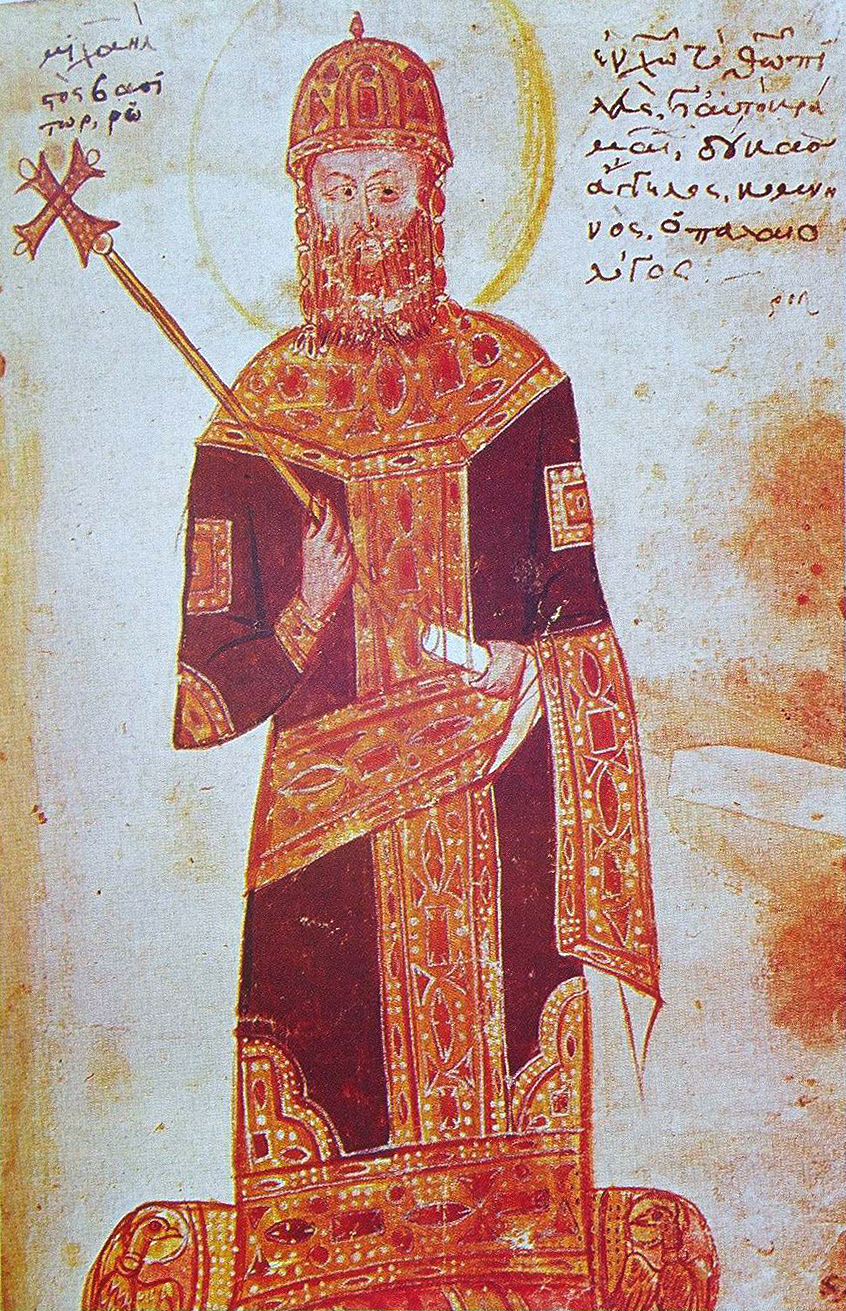
A proposed union of the Eastern Orthodox Church with the Latin Church was devised largely in response to the conflicts between Charles I of Anjou (left) and Michael VIII Palaiologos (right).

Although the Orthodox Michael VIII Palaiologos had reconquered Constantinople from the Latin Empire in 1261, he still faced hostile Catholic states ruled by the French in Greece. The most hostile Catholic enemy of Michael was the new ruler of Sicily, Charles of Anjou, who had conquered Albania from the Despotate of Epirus and was planning to wage a Crusade against the Orthodox polities of the Balkans. To neutralise the threat posed by Charles and the other Catholic entities, Michael proposed a union of the Eastern Orthodoxy with the Latin Church to Pope Clement IV. Eastern dignitaries arrived at Lyon on 24 June 1274 and presented a letter from the Emperor. On 29 June 1274 (the Feast of Peter and Paul, patronal feast of the popes), Gregory celebrated Mass in St John's Church, where both sides took part. The Greeks read the Nicene Creed, with the Western addition of the Filioque clause sung three times. The council was seemingly a success, as Charles of Anjou was directed to divert his aggression towards the Muslim polities of Northern Africa (given the failure of the Eighth Crusade) instead. Given the lingering memory of the 1204 Sack of Constantinople and the persisting Arsenite Schism combined with Frankokratia, the union with the Latins was vehemently opposed by the Greek clergy. Patriarch Joseph of Constantinople abdicated in protest and was replaced by John Bekkos, a convert to the cause of union. In spite of a sustained campaign by Bekkos to defend the union intellectually and vigorous and brutal repression of opponents by Michael, the vast majority of Byzantine Christians remained implacably opposed to union with the Latin "heretics".

The union engineered at Lyons didn't last long. Pope Martin IV excommunicated Michael VIII without provocation on 10 April 1281, at the insistence of Charles of Anjou, who had by this time, asserted his rule over the Principality of Achaea and was planning to attack Constantinople. In response, Michael instigated the Sicilian Vespers, causing Charles to lose his foothold over the island of Sicily and be dragged into a lengthy war with Peter III of Aragon (who eventually conquered Sicily), against whom a Crusade was declared. Michael died on 11 December 1282 and his son and successor, Andronikos II forced Bekkos to abdicate and then put him under house arrest, until his death in 1297. Bekkos was replaced with Gregory II, who convened the Council of Blachernae in 1285, where the union with the Latin Church was formally repudiated, thereby reopening the Great Schism.

The Second Council of Lyons was the first attempt of the Palaiologian Emperors to unite the 2 churches. Another attempt was made at the Council of Florence which was similarly unsuccessful.

=== Plans for crusade ===
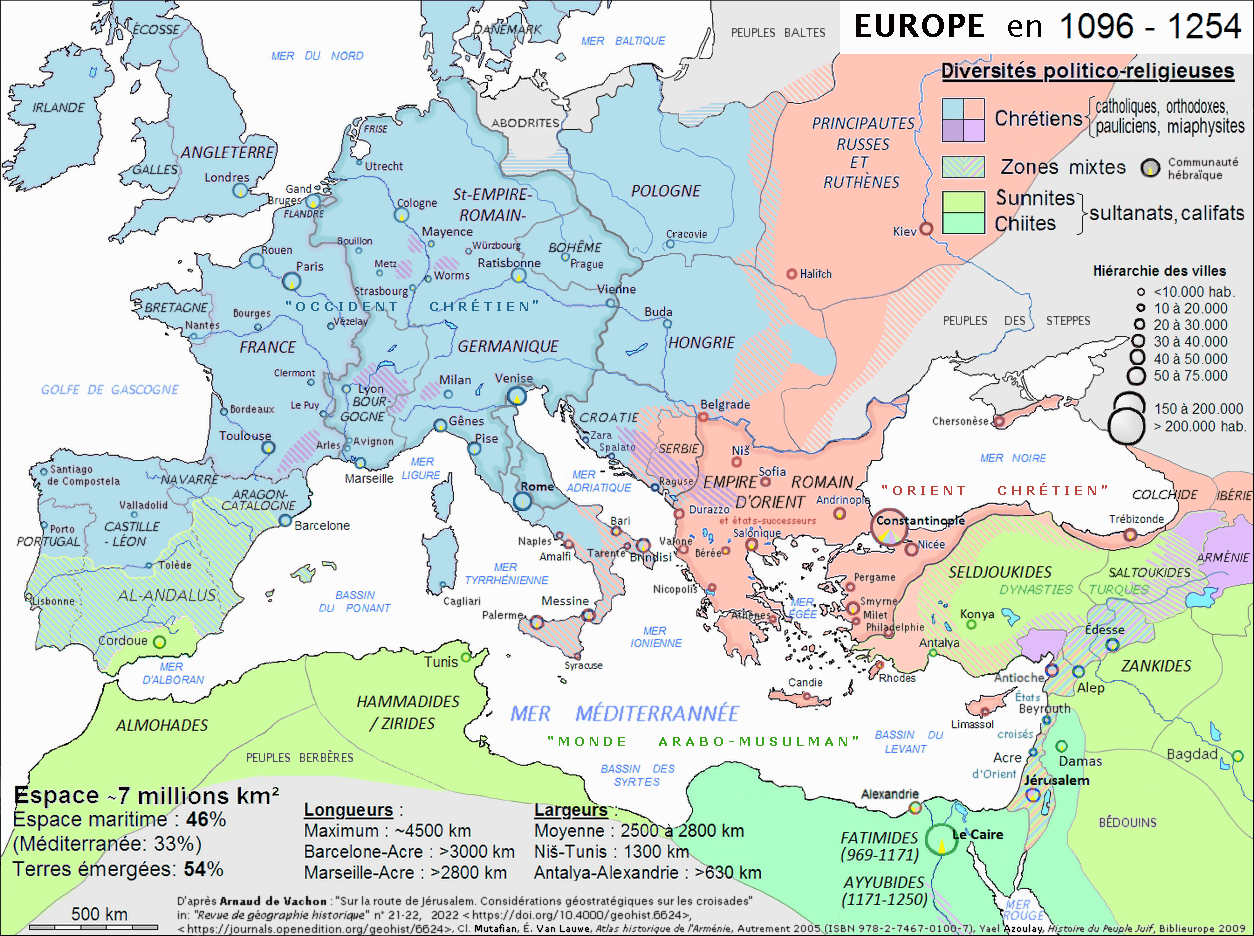
Religious demography of Europe, Middle East and North Africa at the end of the Eighth Crusade. By 1270s, Christian presence in the Holy Land had been significantly reduced following the anti-Christian pogroms orchestrated by the Egyptian sultan Baibars of Mamluk dynasty that had replaced the Ayyubids (shown in the map as being Shia) in the previous decade.

Political situation of the Balkans following the Reconquest of Constantinople. By 1270, Tripoli and Antioch had been conquered by Baibars, who slaughtered its French Catholic elites while sparing the local Greek, Syrian & Armenian populations.

The council drew up plans for a crusade (passagium generale) to recover the Holy Land, which was to be financed by a tithe imposed for six years on all the benefices of Christendom. The plans were approved, but nothing concrete was done. James I of Aragon wished to organise the expedition at once, but was opposed by the Knights Templar. The Franciscan friar Fidentius of Padua, who had experience in the Holy Land, was commissioned by the pope to write a report on the recovery of the Holy Land.

Ambassadors of the Khan of the Tatars negotiated with the Pope, who asked them to leave Christians in peace during their war against Islam. The Ilkhanid ruler Abaqa Khan (who was married to Maria Palaiologina, an illegitimate daughter of Michael VIII) sent a delegation of 13 to 16 Mongols to the council, which created a great stir, particularly when their leader underwent a public baptism. Among the embassy were David of Ashby and the clerk Rychaldus. According to one chronicler, "The Mongols came, not because of the Faith, but to conclude an alliance with the Christians".

Abaqa's Latin secretary Rychaldus delivered a report to the council, which outlined previous diplomatic relations with Louis IX of France that was pursued by Abaqa's father, Hulagu, where, after welcoming the Christian ambassadors to his court, Hulagu had agreed to exempt Latin Christians from taxes and charges in exchange for their prayers for the Qaghan. According to Richardus, Hulagu had also prohibited the molestation of Frankish establishments and committed to recoquer Jerusalem from the Mamluks of Egypt (who had halted Mongol advance at Ain Jalut) and return it to the Franks. Richardus told the assembly that even after Hulagu's death, Abaqa was still determined to drive the Mamluks from Syria.

At the council, Pope Gregory promulgated a new Crusade to start in 1278 in liaison with the Mongols. The Pope put in place a vast program to launch the Crusade, which was written down in his "Constitutions for the zeal of the faith". The text put forward four main decisions to accomplish the Crusade: the imposition of a new tax during three years, the interdiction of any kind of trade with the Saracens, the supply of ships by the Italian maritime republics and the alliance of the West with Byzantine Empire and the Ilkhanid state. However, despite such grandiose papal plans, there was little support from European monarchs, who at this point were more likely to give lip service to the idea of a Crusade than to commit actual troops. The last Crusades (namely the Seventh and Eighth) had ended with disastrous results, with its leader Louis IX of France even getting captured in Egypt during the Seventh one and dying of dysentery at Tunis while leading the Eighth one. The term Crusades was no longer restricted to the recovery of Holy Land and became a general term to describe any religious war orchestrated by the Pope against all sorts of non-believers, as in the case of the Albigensian Crusade, the Northern Crusades and the potential Crusade against the Mongols. Besides, previous Popes had even declared crusades against their own personal enemies, such as when Pope Innocent IV had declared a crusade against Hohenstaufen dynasty (thereby leading Charles to takeover Sicily) in response to his clash with the Frederick II, Holy Roman Emperor (who did actually lead the Sixth Crusade despite being excommunicated). Usage of the term 'crusade' by Popes to justify suppression of peasant uprisings in Germany in 1230s (like those in Drenthe and Stedingen) or the baronial opponents of Henry III of England also contributed to trivialisation of the term, thereby putting the very concept of Crusades into question. Pope Gregory's death in 1276 put an end to any such plans, and the money that had been gathered was instead distributed in Italy. The Ninth Crusade that took place in 1272 was the last European military intervention in the Holy Land until Napoleon's Egyptian campaign.

=== Church reform ===
The council dealt with the reform of the Church regarding which Gregory had sent out inquiries. Several bishops and abbots were deposed for unworthiness. The council restated the Ne Nimium decree of the Fourth Lateran Council in 1215, which suppressed all religious orders founded since. This hit the mendicant orders especially hard, with the Sack Friars and Pied Friars ceasing to exist. On the other hand, the two new orders of Dominicans and Franciscans were approved, and the Augustinian Friars were put in a reserved status, probably on the influence of their cardinal protector Riccardo Annibaldi.

There had been several lengthy vacancies of the Holy See, most recently the sede vacante that had lasted from the death of Clement IV, 29 November 1268, until Gregory's election, 1 September 1271. In response, Gregory issued his bull, Ubi periculum, which established guidelines for the papal conclave. These guidelines stipulated that the papal conclave was to begin within ten days of the pope’s death and that the cardinals were to be sequestered to expedite the papal election.

=== Imperial dispute ===
Finally, the council dealt with the Imperial throne, which Alfonso X of Castile claimed. His claim was disallowed by the Pope, and Rudolph of Hapsburg was proclaimed King of the Romans on 6 June 1274. But Rudolf was unable to travel to Rome in order to be crowned Holy Roman Emperor.

== Commemoration ==
The seventh centenary of the Council was commemorated in Lyon in 1974. Pope Paul VI wrote to Cardinal Willebrands in advance of the celebration, referring to the Council as "the sixth of the General Synods celebrated in the Western world" (Latin: sextum recensetur inter Generales Synodos in Occidentali).

== See also ==
- Contra Errores Graecorum
- History of Lyon
- Bagimonds Roll
- Theological differences between the Catholic Church and the Eastern Orthodox Church
- Ecclesiastical differences between the Catholic Church and the Eastern Orthodox Church
- Niccolò and Maffeo Polo
