= Explicit (text) =

Last lines of a written work

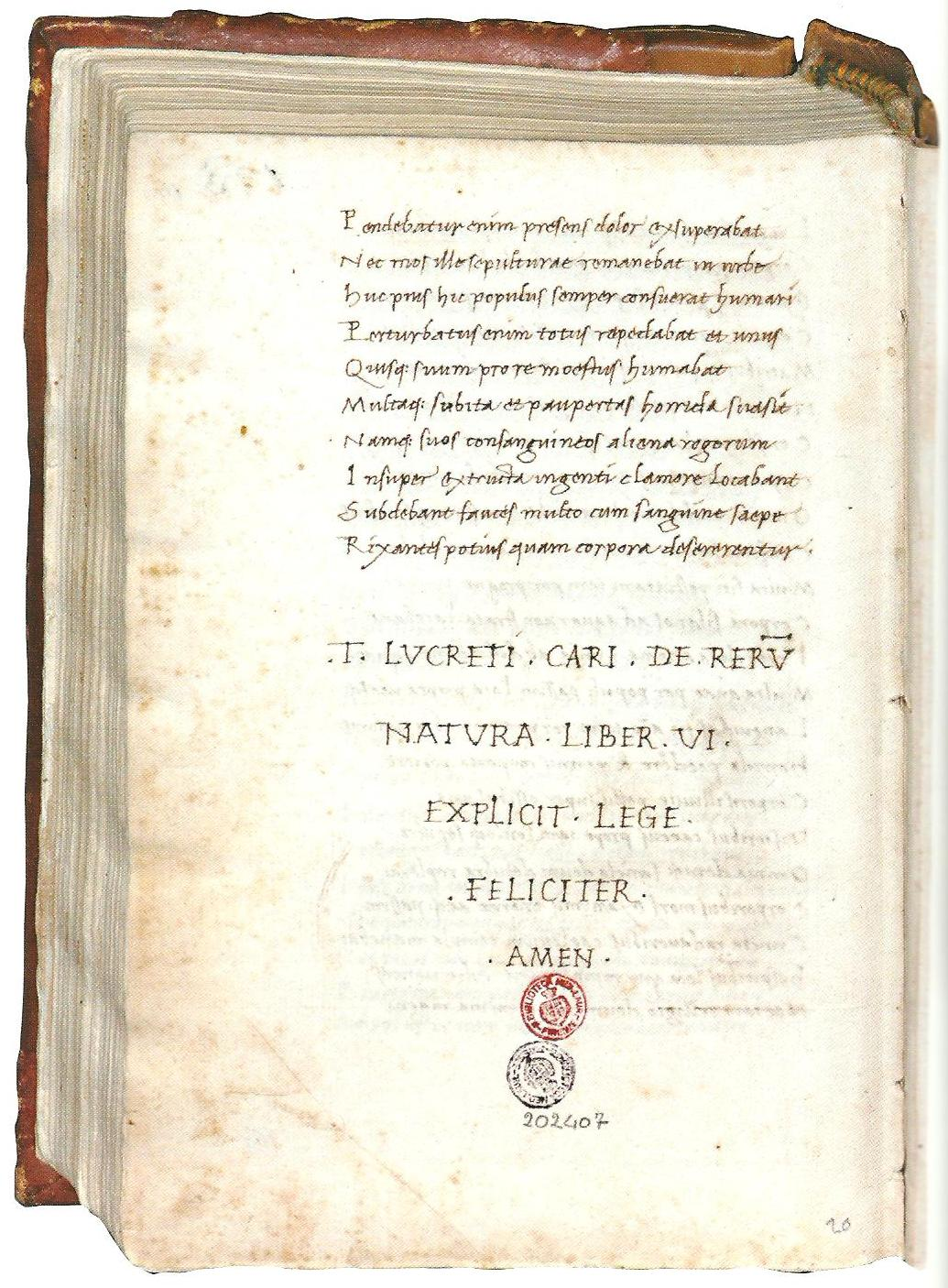
A Latin explicit that uses the word "explicit"

The explicit (from Latin: explicitus est; lit. 'it is unrolled', as applied to scrolls) of a text or document is either a final note indicating the end of the text and often including information about its place, date and authorship; or the final few words of the text itself. In the first case, it is similar to a colophon but always appearing at the end of the text. In the second case, it corresponds to the incipit, the first few words of a text. The end is also referred to as desinit, "it is finished".
