= Corpus Cluniacense =

Collection of Latin writings about Islam compiled in 1142–1143

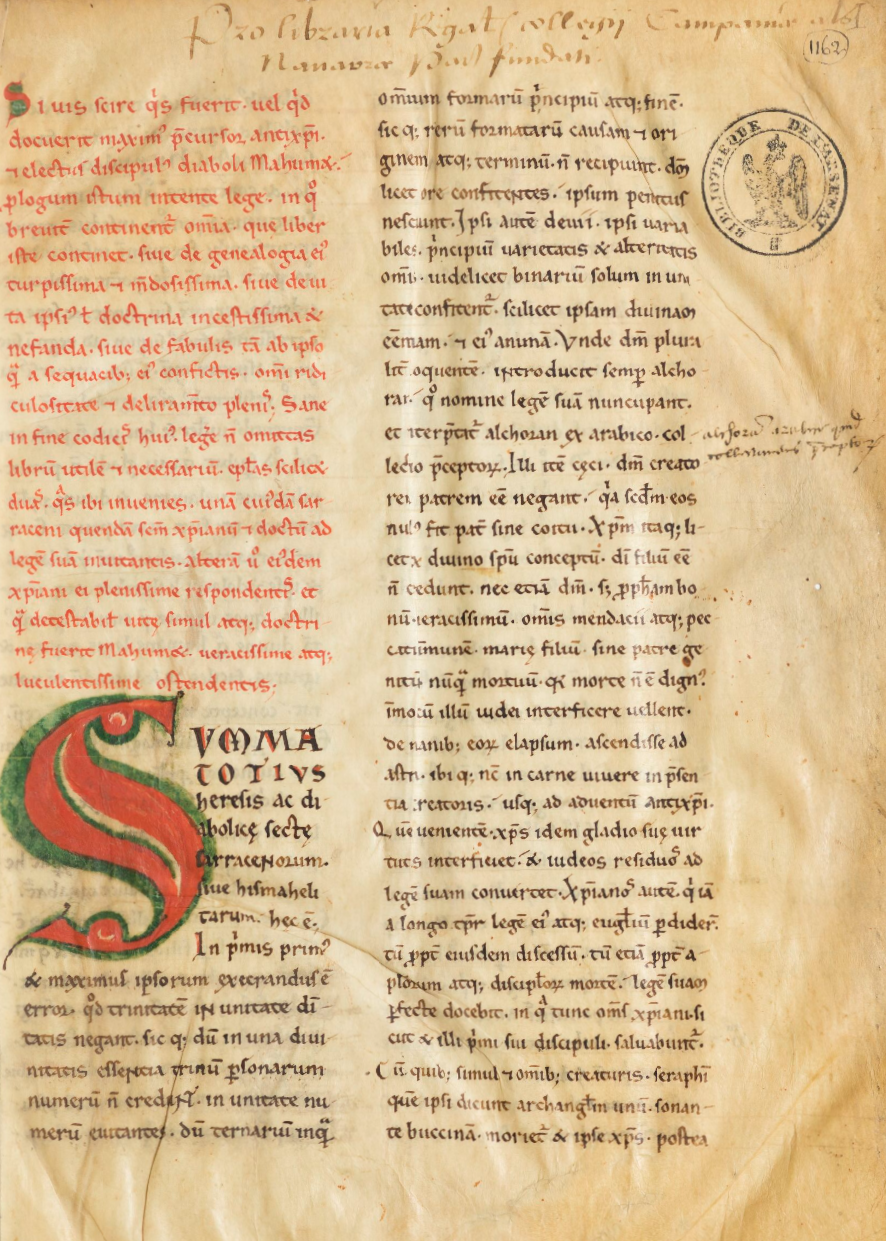
First page of the Corpus in the Arsenal manuscript

The Corpus Cluniacense or Corpus Islamolatinum, sometimes erroneously the Corpus Toledanum, is a collection of Latin writings about Islam compiled in 1142–1143. At its centre are translations from Arabic of five Islamic works, including the Qurʾān. The corpus was commissioned by Abbot Peter the Venerable of Cluny during a trip to Spain. The team of translators was led by Robert of Ketton, who translated the Qurʾān. The other translators were Herman of Carinthia, Peter of Toledo and a Muslim named Muḥammad. They were assisted in their Latin by Peter of Poitiers.

The Corpus comprises:

1. a brief introduction
2. Summa totius haeresis ac diabolice secte Sarracenorum ('Sum of all the Heresies and Diabolical Sect of the Saracens'), a summary that Peter of Poitiers composed of Peter the Venerable's Liber contra sectam siue haeresim Sarracenorum
3. Epistula domini Petri abbatis ad dominum Bernardum Clare Uallis abbatem, the letter of Peter the Venerable addressed to Bernard of Clairvaux
4. Prologus ('Prologue'), an introduction written by Robert of Ketton to the two or three works which follow, sometimes interpreted as a letter to Peter the Venerable
5. Chronica mendosa et ridicula Sarracenorum ('Mistake-Laden and Ridiculous Chronicle of the Saracens'), a history of Islam translated by Robert of Ketton from an unidentified original
6. Liber de generatione Mahumet et nutritura eius ('Book of Muḥammad's Genealogy and his Nurturing'), a translation of Abū al-Ḥasan Bakrī's Kitāb al-anwār by Herman of Carinthia
7. De doctrina Mahumet ('Doctrine of Muḥammad'), a translation of the Masāʾil ʿAbdallāh ibn Salām, an apocryphal account of Muḥammad answering questions from four Jewish inquirers led by Abū al-Ḥārith ʿAbdallāh ibn Salām, originally of the 7th or 8th century, translated by Herman of Carinthia
8. Prephacio ('Preface'), Robert of Ketton's introduction to his translation of the Qurʾān
9. Lex Sarracenorum ('Law of the Saracens'), Robert of Ketton's translation of the Qurʾān
10. Epistola Saraceni et rescriptum Christiani ('Letter of the Saracen and the Response of the Christian'), Peter of Toledo's translation of the Apology of al-Kindi

The earliest manuscript containing most of the Corpus is Paris, Bibliothèque de l'Arsenal, Lat. 1162, which dates to the 12th century. This manuscript also contains the earliest depiction of Muḥammad in western Europe. It also contains a unique heading, Fabulae Sarracenorum ('Tales of the Saracens'), before Robert of Ketton's prologue to the chronicle. The earliest copies of the complete Corpus were made towards 1300 and probably in response to the Second Council of Lyon (1274) and the call to recover the Holy Land after 1291. These copies were made from the original manuscript, which seems to have been brought to England by Peter the Venerable and left there.

The Corpus was edited by Theodor Bibliander and published at Basel by Johannes Oporinus on 11 January 1543 under the title Machumetis Saracenorum principis eiusque successorum vitae ac doctrina, ipseque Alcoran. Martin Luther and Philip Melanchthon provided introductions. The publication was not without controversy, Oporinus having been imprisoned by Basel authorities for his first attempt in 1542. A second edition was printed in 1550 with corrections based on a manuscript copied by Cardinal John of Ragusa in 1437.

== See also ==
- Latin translations of the 12th century
- Latin biographies of Muḥammad

== Bibliography ==
- Constable, Giles, ed. (1967). The Letters of Peter the Venerable. Vol. 1. Harvard University Press.
- De la Cruz Palma, Óscar; Ferrero Hernández, Cándida (2011a). "Hermann of Carinthia". In David Thomas; Alex Mallett; Juan Pedro Monferrer Sala; Johannes Pahlitzsch; Mark Swanson; Herman Teule; John Tolan (eds.). Christian–Muslim Relations: A Bibliographical History. Vol. 3 (1050–1200). Leiden: Brill. pp. 497–507.
- De la Cruz Palma, Óscar; Ferrero Hernández, Cándida (2011b). "Robert of Ketton". In David Thomas; Alex Mallett; Juan Pedro Monferrer Sala; Johannes Pahlitzsch; Mark Swanson; Herman Teule; John Tolan (eds.). Christian–Muslim Relations: A Bibliographical History. Vol. 3 (1050–1200). Leiden: Brill. pp. 508–518.
- Di Cesare, Michelina (2012). The Pseudo-Historical Image of the Prophet Muhammad in Medieval Latin Literature: A Repertory. De Gruyter.
- González Muñoz, Fernando (2011). "Peter of Toledo". In David Thomas; Alex Mallett; Juan Pedro Monferrer Sala; Johannes Pahlitzsch; Mark Swanson; Herman Teule; John Tolan (eds.). Christian–Muslim Relations: A Bibliographical History. Vol. 3 (1050–1200). Leiden: Brill. pp. 478–482.
- Iogna-Prat, Dominque; Tolan, John (2011). "Peter of Cluny". In David Thomas; Alex Mallett; Juan Pedro Monferrer Sala; Johannes Pahlitzsch; Mark Swanson; Herman Teule; John Tolan (eds.). Christian–Muslim Relations: A Bibliographical History. Vol. 3 (1050–1200). Leiden: Brill. pp. 604–610.
- Kritzeck, James (1964). Peter the Venerable and Islam. Princeton University Press.
- Lappin, Anthony John (2021). "On the Genesis and Formation of the Corpus Cluniacense". In Cándida Ferrero Hernández; John Tolan (eds.). The Latin Qur'an, 1143–1500: Translation, Transition, Interpretation. De Gruyter. pp. 27–56.
- López Alcalde, Celia (2012). "Los manuscritos del 'corpus islamolatinum'". In José Martínez Gázquez; Óscar de la Cruz Palma; Cándida Ferrero Hernández (eds.). Estudios de latín medieval hispánico: actas del V Congreso internacional de latín medieval hispánico, Barcelona, 7–10 de septiembre de 2009. pp. 651–656.
- Martínez Gázquez, José (2012). "«Islamolatina»: la percepción del Islam en la Europa cristiana. Traducciones latinas del Corán. Literatura latina de controversia". Medievalia. 15: 39–42. Archived from the original on 2022-12-27.
- Yolles, Julian; Weiss, Jessica, eds. (2018). Medieval Latin Lives of Muhammad. Harvard University Press.
