= Robertus Anglicus (disambiguation) =

Robertus Anglicus or Robert the Englishman may refer to:

- Robert of Chester, 12th-century Arabist
- Robert of Retines, 12th-century Arabist and theologian
- Robert (bishop of Olomouc), ruled 1201–40
- Robert Kilwardby, archbishop of Canterburgy (1272–78)
- Robertus Anglicus, 13th-century astronomer
