= Herman of Carinthia =

12th-century Carinthian astrologer

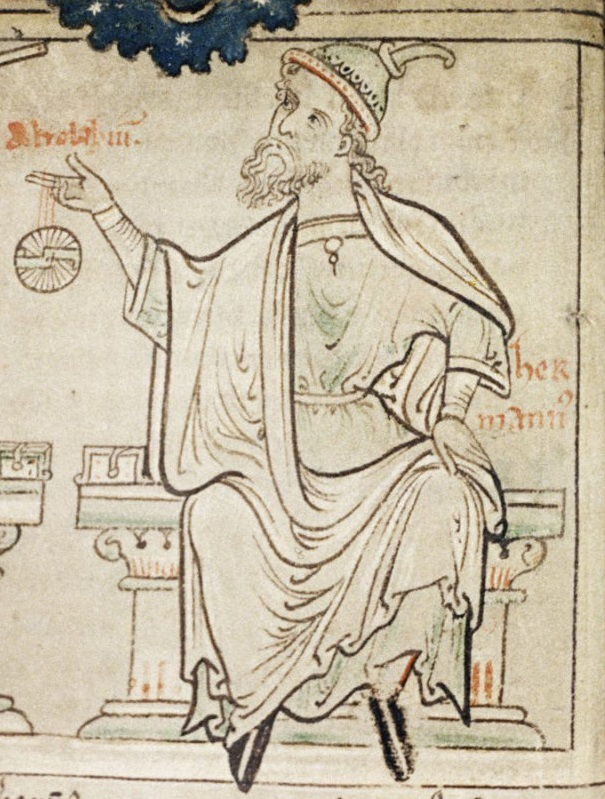
- Depiction of Herman by Matthew of Paris (c.1240×1259)
- Born: c. 1100
- Died: c. 1160
- Other names: Hermannus Sclavus; Hermannus Dalmata

Philosophical work
- Notable works: Liber imbrium, De indagatione cordis, De mensura

Herman of Carinthia (1105/1110 – after 1154), also called Hermannus Dalmata, Hermannus Secundus, Herman Dalmatin, or Sclavus Dalmata, by his own words born in the "heart of Istria", was a philosopher, astronomer, astrologer, mathematician and translator of Arabic works into Latin.

Alongside Adelard of Bath, John of Seville, Gerard of Cremona and Plato of Tivoli, Herman is the most important translator of Arabic astronomical works in 12th century. The influence of his translations on the development of medieval European astronomy was especially large.

== Name ==
Herman (also spelled Hermann) is known by several bynames in English and Latin referring to his land of origin or his ethnicity: Hermann of Carinthia (Hermannus de Carinthia); Hermann of Dalmatia or Hermann the Dalmatian (Hermannus Dalmata); or Hermann the Slav (Hermannus Sclavus). Herman always refers to his homeland as Carinthia or Istria. His own preferred nickname was Hermannus Secundus, that is, the "second Hermann", by way of which he declared himself the successor of Hermannus Contractus, an earlier writer on the astrolabe.

== Life ==
The main sources for Herman's life are the prologues to his own works. These can be supplemented by a few references to him in the writings of his contemporaries. In his own account, he was born in the early 12th century, possibly around 1105 or 1110, in central Istria, then part of the Duchy of Carinthia in the Holy Roman Empire. The location is difficult to pin down given the much broader extent of the March of Istria in the 12th century, which included the Karst Plateau, Trieste, Duino and most of the area of later Inner Carniola, possibly even encompassing the upper Vipava Valley. The term "central Istria" was likely used for all those (predominantly Slavic-inhabited) areas under the rule of the margrave of Istria, as opposed to the predominantly Romance-speaking coastal towns which lived under an autonomous municipal regime.

Herman most likely went to a Benedictine monastic school in Istria. He subsequently studied under Thierry of Chartres, either at Paris or at Chartres, before 1138. It is possible that he first met Robert of Ketton in Paris or Chartres. Richard Hakluyt, quoting an anonymous Latin source from the time of the Second Crusade, says that Robert "traveled through France, Italy, Dalmatia, and Greece, and came at last into Asia, where he lived in great danger of his life among the cruel Saracens, but yet learned perfectly the Arabian tongue" and "returned by sea into Spain", adding that Herman "had accompanied him in his long voyage." This single passage has been elaborated with many conjectures by later historians, some having him pass through Constantinople on his way to Baghdad in 1135 and sojourning in Damascus in 1136–1138.

The first securely datable event in Herman's life is his translation of Sahl ibn Bishr's Fatidica in 1138. In fact, all his activities can be traced only for the period 1138–1143, when he was in Spain.

== Works ==
=== Translation of Islamic works ===
In 1142 Herman was in Spain and became involved in a project to translate Islamic texts. Peter the Venerable recruited a team, including Herman, to translate five texts about Islam into Latin. Different members of the team appear to have concentrated on different works, and Herman is credited as the main translator of two of them: De generatione Muhamet et nutritura eius and De doctrina Muhamet.

The most significant translation in the collection was that of the Qur'an. This was entitled Lex Mahumet pseudoprophete and was the first known translation of the Qur'an into a European language. Robert of Ketton was its principal translator, according to most sources (including the Lex Mahumet pseudoprophete itself). However, Herman may have had some input, given the team nature of the project. Despite being an imperfect translation, Lex Mahumet pseudoprophete remained the standard one for centuries, circulating in manuscript before being printed in the 1543 edition published in Basel by Theodor Bibliander. In this edition both Herman's above-mentioned translations of treatises about Islam appeared together with a preface by Martin Luther.

=== Translations of the classics ===
- Herman translated Euclid's Elements around 1140, possibly in collaboration with Robert of Ketton. (There were also other twelfth century translations).
- Herman translated Claudius Ptolemy's Planisphaerium in Toulouse in 1143. Herman translated it from an Arabic translation from the Greek (jointly with commentaries of Maslamah Ibn Ahmad al-Majriti, who worked in Córdoba in the 10th century). Western European scholastics became aware of Ptolemy's astronomical views via this translation dedicated to Thierry of Chartres. (This translation was for a long time believed to be the only surviving link to Ptolemy's original. Later another Arabic translation was found to have been preserved in Istanbul).

Herman also translated Ptolemy's Canon of Kings. For long many thought that Ptolemy was translated by German Herman Contractus and not by Herman of Carinthia.

=== Astrology and astronomy ===
Herman's first known translation was the sixth book of an astrological treatise Liber sextus astronomie by the Jewish writer Sahl ibn Bishr. It was released in Spain in 1138 under the title Zaelis fatidica (Prophesy). Sahl ibn Bishr had been writing in the Greek astrological tradition. Ibn Bishr's first five books were preserved in the translation of John of Seville (Johannes Hispanus) (circa 1090 – circa 1150). The sixth book deals with three thematic topics regarding the influences on the world and its inhabitants. The work contains divinations based on the movements of the planets and comets.

Circa 1140 Herman translated into Latin the astronomical work of Abu Ma'shar al-Balkhi Kitab al-madkhal ila ilm ahkam al nujum (Introduction to Astronomy). The work contains problems from Greek philosophy, Arabic astronomy and Eastern astrology, and was first translated into Latin by John of Seville in 1133. Herman's less literal translation was published several times under the title Liber introductorius in astronomiam Albumasaris, Abalachii (Augusta Vindelicorum, Augsburg 1489; Venice 1495 and 1506). A large part of Herman's translation was copied into Roger of Hereford's Book of Astronomical Judgements. Sections of Herman's translation were also compiled by the otherwise-unknown medieval author Georgius Zothorus Zaparus Fendulus into his richly illustrated Liber astrologiae (Liber Abumazarus).

Herman produced a version of Muḥammad ibn Mūsā al-Ḵwārizmī's astronomical tables (zij) – they were also translated in 1126 by Adelard of Bath (1075–1164).

Charles Burnett (2001) postulates that Herman collaborated with Robert of Ketton and Hugo of Santalla on the Liber novem iudicum (the Book of Nine Judges), a collection of translations of Arabic astrologers, notably al-Kindi. Their project may have been to supplant the current superstitious Latin astrology with Arabic astronomical science. Arabic texts cite often Hermes as an authority. Burnett postulates that Renaissance magi merely continued this Hermetic tradition begun by Herman, Robert and Hugh. Herman shares technical terminology with Hugh and a penchant for evocation of the Asclepius, most notably in De essentiis (see below)

=== Original writings ===
His original contribution to philosophy was De essentiis (On essences). In this work Herman deals with five Aristotelian categories (causa, motus, spatium, tempus, habitudo). He started to write this treatise in 1143 in Toulouse and he completed it the same year in Béziers. In 1982 this book was reprinted in Germany.

Some other works are believed to be Herman's:

- meteorological Liber imbrium (A book about precipitations) (1140 to 1141)
- astrological De indagatione cordis (About heart researches) (after 1140)

In the text (or a manuscript, the syntax of this article was not clear) of De indagatione cordis there are many names of scientists and scholars whose work Herman knew and used: Abu Ma'shar al-Balkhi (787–886), Sahl ibn Bishr, Aomar Tiberia, Abu al-Kindi (801–873), the eighth-century Jewish astrologer Al Batrig Mashallah (Messahalla), Hermes, and Dorotheos of Sidon.

- mathematical and astronomical De mensura, De utilitatibus astrolabii, De compositione et usu astrolabii (before 1143 – Herman was certainly interested in the Astrolabe – the portrait shows Herman with one)

Many medieval authors refer to Herman's work, for instance Albert the Great (Albert von Bollstädt, Albertus Magnus), instructor to Thomas Aquinas, in his work Speculum astronomiae.

== See also ==
- Latin translations of the 12th century
- Transmission of the Greek Classics
- Islamic world contributions to Medieval Europe

== Bibliography ==
=== Editions ===
- Burnett, Charles S. F. (1982). De Essentiis: A Critical Edition with Translation and Commentary. E. J. Brill.
- Low-Beer, Sheila (1979). Herman of Carinthia: The Liber imbriam, the Fatidica and the De indagatione Cordis (PhD diss.). City University of New York.

=== Secondary literature ===
- Burnett, Charles S. F. (1976). "The Legend of the Three Hermes and Abū Ma'shar's Kitāb al-Ulūf in the Latin Middle Ages". Journal of the Warburg and Courtauld Institutes. 39: 231–234. doi:10.2307/751140. JSTOR 751140. S2CID 195057340.
- Burnett, Charles S. F. (1981). "Hermann of Carinthia and the Kitāb al-Isṭamāṭīs: Further Evidence for the Transmission of Hermetic Magic". Journal of the Warburg and Courtauld Institutes. 44: 167–169. doi:10.2307/751059. JSTOR 751059. S2CID 192925690.
- Burnett, Charles S. F. "Hermann of Carinthia [Hermannus Dalmata, Hermannus Sclavus, Hermannus Secundus]". Grove Music Online. Oxford Music Online. doi:10.1093/gmo/9781561592630.article.45462. ISBN 978-1-56159-263-0.
- de la Cruz Palma, Óscar; Ferrero Hernández, Cándida (2011). "Hermann of Carinthia". In David Thomas; Alex Mallett (eds.). Christian–Muslim Relations: A Bibliographical History. Vol. 3 (1050–1200). Brill. pp. 497–507.
- Hockey, Thomas (2014). "Hermann the Dalmatian". Biographical Encyclopedia of Astronomers. Springer. p. 933. Bibcode:2014bea..book..933H. doi:10.1007/978-1-4419-9917-7_606. ISBN 978-1-4419-9916-0.
- Kos, Milko (1933). Srednjeveška zgodovina Slovencev. Ljubljana.
- Kutleša, Stipe (2004). "Croatian Philosophers I: Hermann of Dalmatia (1110–1154)". Prolegomena: Časopis za filozofiju. 3 (1): 57–71.
- Paić-Vikuć, Tatjana (2018). "Hermann the Dalmatian's Purported Role in the Translation of the Quran into Latin". Collegium Antropologicum. 42 (4): 277–280.
- Paić-Vikuć, Tatjana (2019). "The Biography of Hermann the Dalmatian: Separating Conjectures from Verifiable Claims". Exploring the Commonalities of the Mediterranean Region. Turkish Academy of Sciences. pp. 85–96. ISBN 978-605-2249-41-3.
