= Roger of Hereford =

12th-century English astronomer

Roger of Hereford (or Rogerus Herefordensis, or Roger Infans, or Roger Puer); a medieval astronomer, astrologer, alchemist and mathematician active in Hereford circa. 1178 – 1198.

Roger's nationality, year of birth, and education are unknown. The earliest record dates to a commission in 1176 by Gilbert Foliot, the former Bishop of Hereford and then the Bishop of London, of a computus for the calculation of ecclesiastical dates. In this treatise Roger criticizes the calculations of Gerland as used in the standard text of the time, and draws on Hebrew and Arabic learning.

Roger's connection with Hereford are established by calculations in his tables setting the meridian at Hereford in 1178. It is probable that he and the Roger Infans attested in charters at Hereford (1186–1198), are one and the same.

Roger's astronomical treatise, Liber de Quatuor Partibus Judiciorum Astronomie, draws on Raimond de Marseille, and translations of Arabic texts by Juan de Sevilla and Hermann of Carinthia.

Roger wrote an astrological text, Judicial Astrology, which provide a number of astrological techniques dedicated to horary and electional astrology, including a section on discovering the intention of the questioner. This manuscript was first analysed in detail by Nicholas Whyte in 1991, in which Whyte suggested that a horoscope in this manuscript was that of Eleanor of Aquitaine.

A subsequent more detailed analysis of all 22 extant manuscripts of Judicial Astrology was undertaken as a PhD thesis by Chris Mitchell at the University of Leicester.

A translation by Alfred of Shareshill is dedicated to Roger. Roger may be credited for a new method of calculating horoscopes.

Roger's importance rests largely as a transmitter of the scholarship of Adelard of Bath and the ancient authors, including Robert Grosseteste, with whom Roger shared a household in his latter years at Hereford.
