= Peter of Toledo =

Spanish linguist

Peter of Toledo was a significant translator into Latin of the twelfth century. He was one of the team preparing the first Latin translation of the Qur'an (the Lex Mahumet pseudoprophete).

While not much is known of his life, from his knowledge of Arabic he is assumed to have been a Mozarab, familiar with Hispanic Arabic. His employment as a translator suggests that he was connected with the Toledo School of Translators, which was supported by the archbishop of Toledo, Raymond de Sauvetât. Deficiencies in the translation of Apology of al-Kindy, on which he is known to have worked, indicate that his knowledge of Classical Arabic was limited.

In 1142, Peter the Venerable, abbot of Cluny, visited Spain and recruited a team of translators who were to translate five Arabic texts, including the Qur'an. The collection is known at the Corpus Cluniacense. The translation work went on in 1142–1143. Peter of Toledo appears to have been the principal translator of only one of the texts, the Apology, but he played a key role in the project as a whole, collaborating with three other people who were familiar with Arabic, Robert of Ketton, Herman of Carinthia, a Muslim called Mohammed and also with Peter of Poitiers, who undertook the polishing of the Latin. Kritzeck credits Peter of Toledo with having planned and annotated the collection, but this interpretation depends on the Peter being the author of anonymous glosses in a manuscript which has survived in France.
