= Masa'il Abdallah ibn Salam =

Book on Islam by Abdallāh ibn Salām

Start of the Latin translation in a twelfth-century manuscript

The Masāʾil ʿAbdallāh ibn Salām ('Questions of ʿAbdallāh ibn Salām'), also known as the Book of One Thousand Questions among other titles, is an Arabic treatise on Islam in the form of Muḥammad's answers to questions posed by the Jewish inquirer ʿAbdallāh ibn Salām. The work is considered apocryphal, with neither the questions nor the answers attributable to the named protagonists.

Originally composed in the tenth century and widely translated, the Masāʾil is today regarded as a piece of world literature. A Latin version appeared in the twelfth century and a Persian one by the sixteenth. From Latin it was translated into Dutch, French, German, Italian and Portuguese; from Persian into Urdu, Malay and Tamil. From the Arabic, translations were also made into Buginese, Javanese, Sundanese and English.

== Synopsis ==
The Masāʾil consists of a series of questions and answers within a fictional frame story.

A sixteenth-century copy of the Latin version, with space for a large initial that was never added

Muḥammad has sent a letter to the Jews of the oasis of Khaybar requesting their conversion to Islam. The Jews therefore send ʿAbdallāh ibn Salām to ascertain if Muḥammad is indeed a prophet. In Medina, Muḥammad receives advanced warning of the approach of ʿAbdallāh and his three companions from the angel Gabriel. He therefore sends ʿAlī to meet them and greet them by name. His foreknowledge impresses them.

ʿAbdallāh announces his purpose to Muḥammad, "to enquire of you the explanation of matters which are not clear to us from our own law." Convinced of their sincerity, Muḥammad permits the Jews to ask as many questions as they like, whereupon ʿAbdallāh produces "one hundred principal questions which had been carefully chosen." The exact number of questions asked is unclear, since some are clearly intended only as followups.

The Masāʾil is a rambling work. The questions posed by ʿAbdallāh range across various fields well beyond theology. The first question is, "Are you a prophet [nabiyy] or a messenger [rasūl]?" Muḥammad answers that he is both. Asked about prior prophets, Muḥammad claims that they all proclaimed the same "law and faith". True faith is required for admission into Heaven. He refers to the written revelation he received from God, the Qurʾān, as al-Furqān ('separation') because it came to him in parts, unlike the Torah, the Psalms and the Gospels, which were revealed, respectively, to Moses, David and Jesus all at once.

Subsequent theological questions concern the Torah, the creation of Adam and Eve, the nature of Heaven and Hell (including their respective levels), angels and Judgement Day. There is an exchange on the significance of the numbers 1–100. Other topics include law, medicine and geography. Muḥammad quotes the Qurʾān seventeen times in support of his answers. ʿAbdallāh tests him with riddles. These are often scriptural, e.g., "What land did the sun see once, but will never again see to the end of time?" The answer is "the bottom of the Red Sea".

The Masāʾil has Muḥammad claim that Jerusalem is the centre of the world. In Heaven, the blessed will not consume pork, but will have wine and engage in sexual intercourse, since "if any kind of pleasure were missing, beatitude would not be complete.". The final question posed by ʿAbdallāh is, "What will become of death?" Muḥammad answers that "death will be changed into a ram", that "the people of heaven, for fear of death, will plot its destruction; the people of hell, in the hope of dying, will desire it to survive" and that in the ensuing battle the ram (death) will be killed between heaven and hell. After this, ʿAbdallāh announces his conversion and recites the shahāda.

== Textual history ==
=== Arabic text ===
A fifteenth-century copy of the Arabic text

The Masāʾil was probably written in the tenth century. Although ʿAbdallāh was a historical Jewish convert to Islam from the time of Muḥammad, the Masāʾil is an apocryphal work, a late development of the ʿAbdallāh legend, "amplified dramatically" and not an authentic record of actual discussions. It ultimately derives from Jewish sources and was probably composed by a "Jewish renegade".

The earliest reference to the Masāʾil dates to 963 and is found in al-Balʿamī's Persian translation of al-Ṭabarī's Arabic Annals of Apostles and Kings. The Arabic Masāʾil circulated as a standalone work, but was also incorporated into the Pearl of Wonders of Ibn al-Wardī. The earliest manuscript of the former type dates to the fifteenth century, while the earliest copy of the Pearl is from the sixteenth. The first printed edition of the Masāʾil appeared in Cairo in 1867. An English translation from the Arabic by Nathan Davis was printed in 1847 under the title The Errors of Mohammedanism Exposed: or, A Dialogue Between the Arabian Prophet and a Jew.

=== Western tradition ===
Earlier than the surviving Arabic texts is a Latin translation by Hermann of Carinthia from 1143. This survives in one manuscript of the twelfth century and in many of the thirteen and fourteenth. It provides indirect testimony of an early Arabic version. The Latin translation, entitled Liber de doctrina Mahumet, was commissioned by Abbot Peter the Venerable as part of a body of Islamic translations for Christian scholars, the Corpus Cluniacense, which also includes a Latin translation of the Qurʾān. The Latin version was first printed as part of the Corpus in 1543. It was later translated into Dutch (printed 1658), French (printed 1625), German (printed 1540), Italian and Portuguese.

In a description of the Moluccas based on the 1598 expedition of Jacob Corneliszoon van Neck and Wybrand van Warwijck, the Liber de doctrina Mahumet is quoted to help make sense of Islamic customs. Thus, because of the Latin edition, Christians from the North Sea and Muslims from the Banda Sea could make use of the same text for a basic understanding of Islam in the early modern period.

=== Eastern tradition ===
A Malay copy in Jawi script on paper from 1827

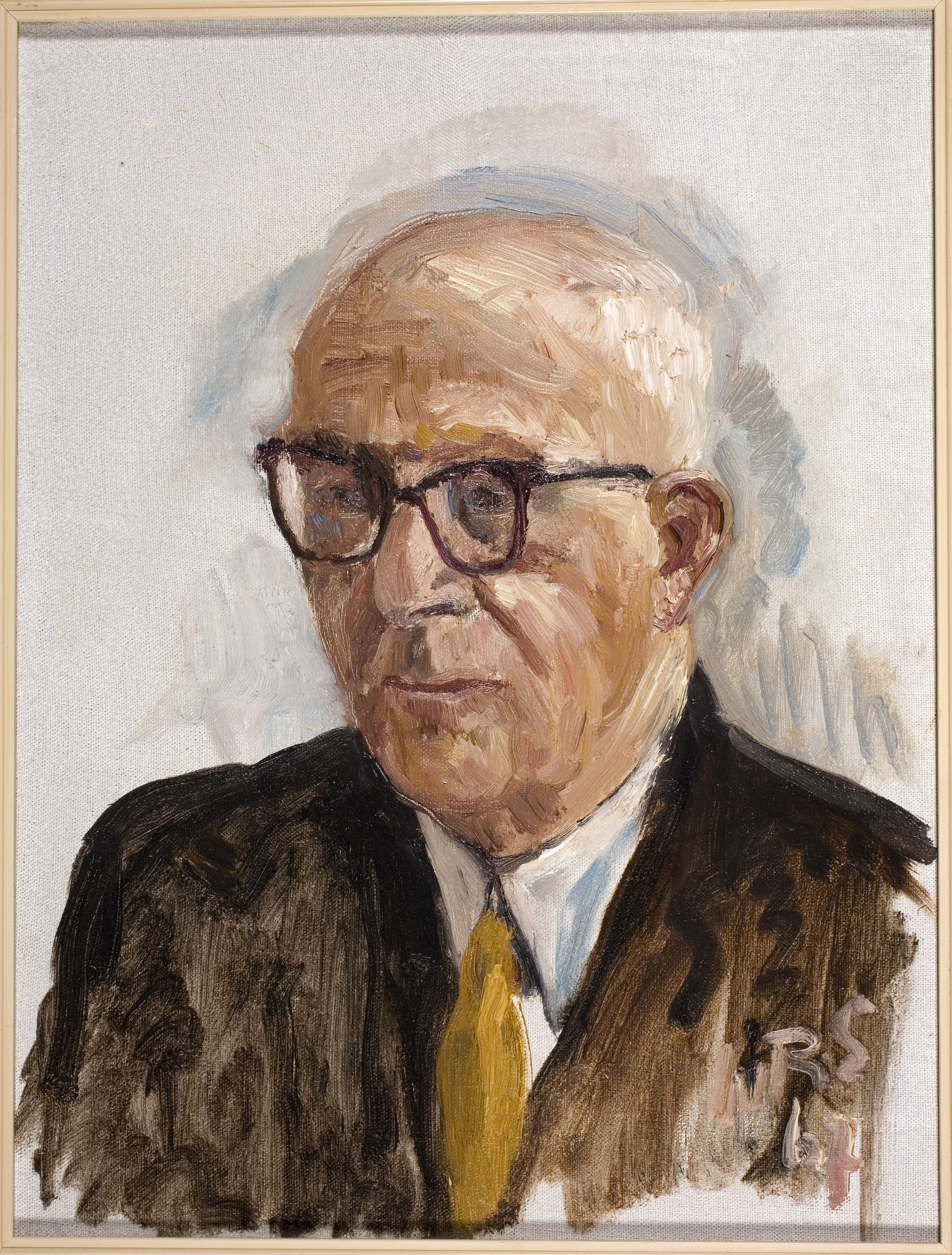
Guillaume Pijper published a study of the Malay version with a Dutch translation in 1924

In South India, the Arabic Masāʾil was translated into Persian by the sixteenth century. There are several additions found in the Persian text. It was in Persian that it first became known as the Book of One Thousand Questions and also as the Book of Twenty-Eight Questions. It was translated into Urdu under the titles Hazār Masʾala (One Thousand Questions) and ʿAqāʾida Nāma and was popular in the nineteenth century. There is also a Tamil version, Āyira Macalā, that was translated by Vaṇṇapparimaḷappulavar and published in a ceremony at the court of the Madurai Nayaks in 1572. It was based on a Persian version and is the earliest Muslim work in Tamil that survives complete.

In the Indonesian archipelago, the Masāʾil was translated into Buginese, Javanese, Malay and Sundanese. The Arabic Masāʾil seems to have reached Java by 1711. It was translated into Javanese by the late seventeenth or early eighteenth century, probably from Arabic. Its Javanese title is Samud. Like some later Arabic versions, it gives the number of questions as 1,404. The Malay version, on the other hand, was translated from Persian. It is known from over thirty manuscripts and goes by variations of the title Seribu Masala ('thousand questions'). François Valentyn saw a copy on Ambon in 1726.

== Reception ==
In western Europe, it was seen "as a supplement to, or commentary on, the Qurʾān". It was commonly regarded as an authoritative text second only to the Qurʾān. Although the work was widely copied and quoted in Arabic, it was never a highly regarded text among Islamic theologians. In twentieth-century India, the reformer Ashraf Ali Thanwi advised against reading it. Nevertheless, it "came to be regarded as a catechism of Islamic belief" among Muslims in insular southeast Asia. Steven Wasserstrom labelled it "a popular mini-encyclopedia of Islamic cosmology and doxology".

The Latin translation was influential in Europe. It was used as a source on Islam by Alfonso de Espina, Nicolas of Cusa, Dionysius the Carthusian, Ludovico Marracci and the author of the Theophrastus redivivus.

Today, the Masāʾil is sometimes treated as an example of world literature.

== Bibliography ==
- Cecini, Ulisse (2021a). "Qurʾan Quotations in the Liber de Doctrina Mahumet". In Cándida Ferrero Hernández; John Tolan (eds.). The Latin Qur'an, 1143–1500: Translation, Transition, Interpretation. De Gruyter. pp. 337–348.
- Cecini, Ulisse, ed. (2021b). Masāʾil ʿAbdallāh ibn Salām (Doctrina Mahumet): Kritische Edition des arabischen Textes mit Einleitung und Übersetzung. Harrassowitz.
- Colominas Aparicio, Mònica (2018). The Religious Polemics of the Muslims of Late Medieval Christian Iberia Identity and Religious Authority in Mudejar Islam. Brill.
- Daiber, Hans (1991). "Masāʾil wa-adjwiba". In Bosworth, C. E.; van Donzel, E. & Pellat, Ch. (eds.). The Encyclopaedia of Islam, Second Edition. Volume VI: Mahk–Mid. Leiden: E. J. Brill. pp. 636–639. ISBN 978-90-04-08112-3.
- Damrosch, David (2014). "Introduction: World Literature in Theory and Practice". In David Damrosch (ed.). World Literature in Theory. John Wiley & Sons. pp. 1–12.
- De la Cruz Palma, Óscar; Ferrero Hernández, Cándida (2011). "Hermann of Carinthia". In David Thomas; Alex Mallett; Juan Pedro Monferrer Sala; Johannes Pahlitzsch; Mark Swanson; Herman Teule; John Tolan (eds.). Christian–Muslim Relations: A Bibliographical History. Vol. 3 (1050–1200). Leiden: Brill. pp. 497–507.
- Drewes, G. W. J. [in German] (1986). "Javanese Versions of the 'Questions of ʿAbdallah b. Salam'". Bijdragen tot de Taal-, Land- en Volkenkunde. 142 (2): 325–327. doi:10.1163/22134379-90003361. JSTOR 27863760.
- Horovitz, Josef (1960). "ʿAbd Allāh b. Salām". In Gibb, H. A. R.; Kramers, J. H.; Lévi-Provençal, E.; Schacht, J.; Lewis, B. & Pellat, Ch. (eds.). The Encyclopaedia of Islam, Second Edition. Volume I: A–B. Leiden: E. J. Brill. p. 51. OCLC 495469456.
- Kritzeck, James (1964). Peter the Venerable and Islam. Princeton University Press.
- Pijper, Guillaume Frédéric (1924). Het boek der duizend vragen. E. J. Brill.
- Ricci, Ronit (2006). Translating Conversion in South and Southeast Asia: The Islamic Book of One Thousand Questions in Javanese, Tamil and Malay (Doctoral dissertation). University of Michigan.
- Ricci, Ronit (2008). "A Jew on Java, a Model Malay Rabbi and a Tamil Torah Scholar: Representations of Abdullah Ibnu Salam in the Book of One Thousand Questions". Journal of the Royal Asiatic Society. 18 (4): 481–495. doi:10.1017/S135618630800864X. hdl:1885/31315. S2CID 162585802.
- Ricci, Ronit (2009a). "Conversion to Islam on Java and the Book of One Thousand Questions". Bijdragen tot de Taal-, Land- en Volkenkunde. 165 (1): 8–31. doi:10.1163/22134379-90003641. JSTOR 43817799.
- Ricci, Ronit (2009b). "Saving Tamil Muslims from the Torments of Hell: Vannapparimalappulavar's Book of One Thousand Questions". In Barbara D. Metcalf (ed.). Islam in South Asia in Practice. Princeton University Press. pp. 190–200.
- Ricci, Ronit (2011). Islam Translated: Literature, Conversion, and the Arabic Cosmopolis of South and Southeast Asia. University of Chicago Press.
- Ricci, Ronit (2014). "Islamic Literary Networks in South and Southeast Asia". In David Damrosch (ed.). World Literature in Theory. John Wiley & Sons. pp. 437–459.
- Steenbrink, Karel A. (1993). Dutch Colonialism and Indonesian Islam: Contacts and Conflicts, 1596–1950. Translated by Jan Steenbrink; Henry Jansen. Rodopi.
- Wasserstrom, Steven M. (1995). Between Muslim and Jew: The Problem of Symbiosis under Early Islam. Princeton University Press.
