= Johannes Oporinus =

Swiss humanist printer (1507–1568)

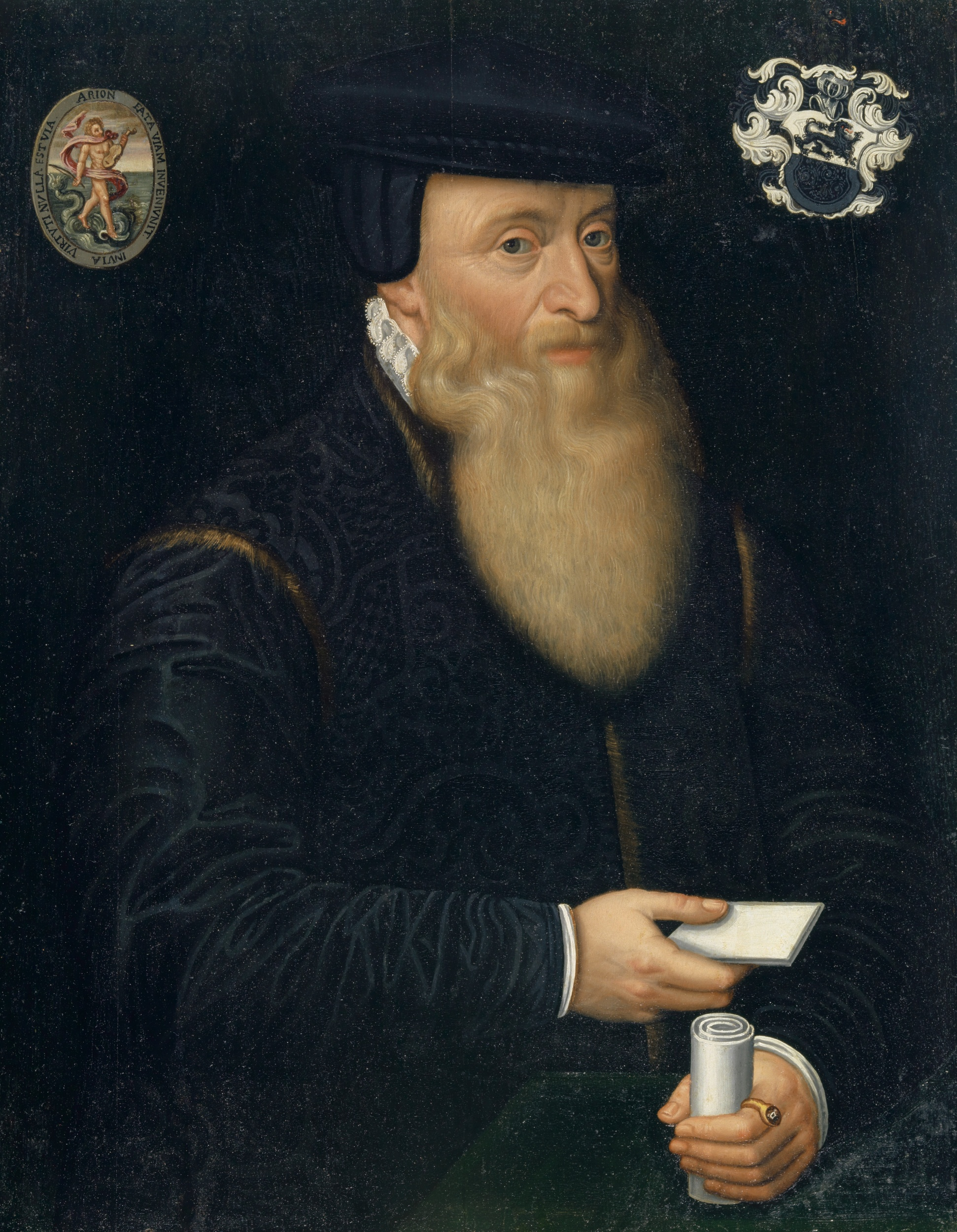
- Portrait of Johannes Oporinus
- Born: 25 January 1507; Basel
- Died: 7 July 1568 (aged 61); Basel
- Known for: Publication of Vesalius; first printed Koran amanuensis of Paracelsus
- Scientific career
- Fields: printing, medicine, classical philology
- Workplaces: University of Basel

Johannes Oporinus (also Johannes Oporin; Latinised from the original German name: Johannes Herbster or Hans Herbst) (25 January 1507 – 7 July 1568) was a humanist printer in Basel.

== Life ==
Johannes Oporinus, the son of the painter Hans Herbst, was born in Basel. He completed his academic training in Strasbourg and Basel. After working as a teacher in the Cistercian convent of St. Urban, he returned to Basel, where he taught at the school of Leonhard. In Basel, he enrolled into the University of Basel, where he studied law under Bonifacius Amerbach and Hebrew with Thomas Platter. Concordantly he worked as a proofer in the workshop of Johann Froben, the most important printer of Basel the early 16th Century. In addition, he taught at the Basel Latin school from 1526. In 1527 he was temporarily famulus to the physician Paracelsus.

From 1538, Oporinus was the professor for Greek and Latin at the University of Basel. In 1542 he resigned his academic post to devote himself full-time to his printing workshop. In addition, he completed a medical studies. In 1567, he sold his printshop to the Gemuseus family. Humanist physician Theodor Zwinger was a nephew via his sister.

== Publications ==
He published a Latin version of the Gesta Danorum in 1534, entitled Saxonis grammatici Danorum historiae libri XVI.

In 1542, he attempted to print the first Quran in Latin, edited by Theodor Bibliander from a translation made by Robert of Ketton in Spain in 1142–1143. This Quran was part of a collection of Islamic works commissioned by Peter the Venerable. The municipal authorities imprisoned Oporinus for a short while, but a letter from Martin Luther convinced them to permit the printing. Luther and Philip Melanchthon provided introductory essays for the edition.

The most important publication of his workshop was the anatomical atlas De humani corporis fabrica by the humanist physician Andreas Vesalius, in 1543. In October 1546 a book on the assassination of the Spanish Protestant Juan Díaz, entitled Historia vera de morti sancti viri Ioannis Diazii Hispanics [...] by Claudium Senarclaeum, was published by his workshop, which is attributed to Francisco de Enzinas.

In addition, his press published numerous polemical theological works, classics, and historiographical works. His fine knowledge of ancient languages served the quality of consistently correct textual editions. Oporinus later printed a work on church history by Matthias Flacius Illyricus: Catalogus testium veritatis (1556) and the first eleven (1559–1567) of Wigand's thirteen Magdeburg Centuries. In 1559 he published the complete editio princeps of Diodorus Siculus' Bibliotheca historica. Before he died, he planned to publish the first Bible in the Spanish language, for which Casiodoro de Reina paid 400 guilders in advance. But Oporinus died before the bible was able to go into print.

== Oporinus' mark ==
Looking at title page or at the colophon of an Oporinus edition, the printer's device shows the mythological lyre player Arion of Lesbos, which is supported by a Dolphin on the sea. There are more variant forms of it, some are shown below.

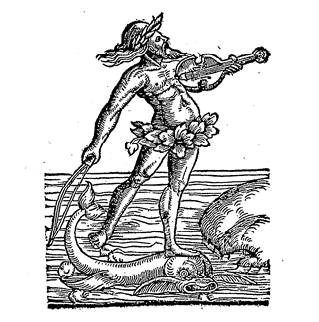

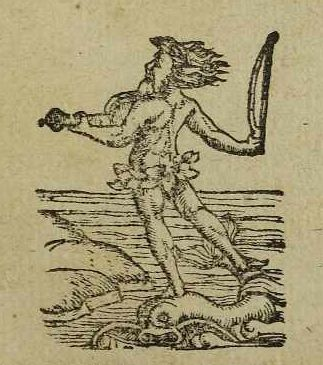

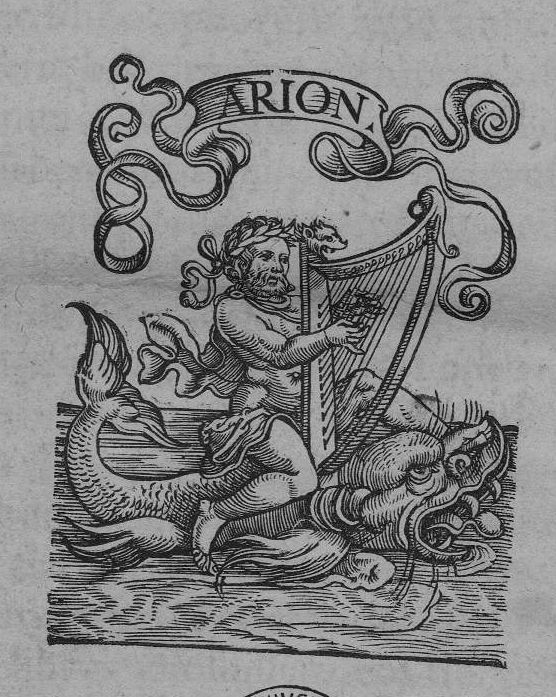

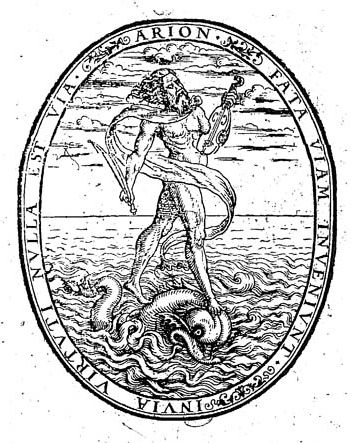

== Personal life ==
He was born to Hans Herbst (also spelled Herbster) and Barbara Lupfart. His father was a painter from Strasbourg and lost most of his work with the reformation. He was married four times, each time with a widow. The third wife was a sister of the publisher Johan Hervagius the younger (died 1564) and the fourth a sister of Basilius Amerbach. He died deeply in debt on the 7 July 1568 and all his possessions were confiscated by the authorities in order to pay his creditors. Theodor Zwinger was his nephew. He had an extensive library of 4000 books, which was auctioned. His manuscript collection and his extensive correspondence are preserved in the Basel University Library.
