= Pedro de Toledo =

Pedro de Toledo may refer to:

== Places ==
- Pedro de Toledo, Brazil, a municipality in the state of São Paulo in Brazil.

== People ==
- Pedro de Toledo y Zúñiga (1484–1553), Spanish Viceroy of Naples
- Pedro de Toledo, 1st Marquis of Mancera (c. 1585–1654), Spanish viceroy of Peru.
- Pedro Álvarez de Toledo, a number of other people called Pedro Álvarez de Toledo
- Peter of Toledo 12th century translator into Latin.
- Pedro Manuel de Toledo (1860–1935), leader of the Constitutionalist Revolution in Brazil.
