= Apology of al-Kindi =

Medieval theological polemic

Apology of al-Kindi (also spelled al-Kindy) is a medieval theological polemic making a case for Christianity and drawing attention to alleged flaws in Islam. The word "apology" is a translation of the Arabic word "risāla" (رسالة), and it is used in the sense of apologetics.

It is attributed to an Arab Christian referred to as Abd al-Masih ibn Ishaq al-Kindi. This Al-Kindi is otherwise unknown, and is clearly different from the Muslim philosopher Abū Yūsuf ibn Iṣḥāq al-Kindī.

The significance of the work lies in its availability to Europe's educated elite from as early as the twelfth century as a source of information about Islam.

== Publishing history ==
The date of composition of the Apology is controversial. The earliest surviving manuscripts of the Arabic text are seventeenth century. However, the Arabic manuscripts are predated by a twelfth-century Latin translation made in Spain, where the Arabic text is assumed to have been circulating among Mozarabs.

The translation into Latin was a collaborative work on which a Spaniard Peter of Toledo was the main translator. Professor Jan van Koningsveld has identified various errors in the Latin translation attributable to a limited knowledge of Classical Arabic on the part of the translator. While Peter of Toledo's Arabic appears to have been less than perfect, it was better than his Latin, and a French scholar Peter of Poitiers polished the Latin text. Both men were part of a team recruited by Peter the Venerable, who also commissioned translations of other Arabic texts, including the Qur'an. Peter the Venerable's aim was to convert Muslims to Christianity, and for that reason it can be argued that his interpretation of Islam was inherently negative, but he did manage to set out "a more reasoned approach to Islam… through using its own sources rather than those produced by the hyperactive imagination of some earlier Western Christian writers". After circulating in manuscript, Peter the Venerable's so-called Toledan Collection was published in print in the sixteenth century with a preface by Martin Luther.

Excerpts from the Apology of al-Kindy became available in English through William Muir's translation of 1882. Like its Latin predecessor, Muir's (partial) translation was intended for missionary purposes, as he states in the preface.

The book is extensively quoted in Vincent of Beauvais' Speculum Maius, a major 13th century encyclopaedia.

== Contents ==
The Apology purports to be a record of a dialogue between a Muslim and a Christian. In fact, the book contains two apologies: The Muslim first invites the Christian to embrace Islam. The Christian declines this and in turn invites the Muslim to embrace Christianity. The Christian's answer comprises some six-sevenths of the text.

The two participants are referred to by pseudonyms, according to the text to secure their safety. The Muslim participant, called "'Abd-Allah ibn Isma'il al-Hashimi" (which translates as "Servant of Allah, son of Ishmael, from the clan Banu Hashim), is described as a cousin of the unnamed Caliph, living in the Caliph's castle and being well versed in Christian theology. He is also described as having a close and trusted Christian friend called "'Abd al-Masih ibn Ishaq al-Kindi" (which translates as "Servant of Christ, son of Isaac, from the tribe Kinda").

== Controversy regarding the dating of the Apology ==
=== Views of William Muir ===
Muir acknowledged difficulties in obtaining a reliable version of the Arabic text, but he defended the authenticity of the work, noting that the Apology was quoted by Abu-Rayhan Biruni around the year 1000 as the Epistle of "Abd al Masîh ibn Ishâc, Al Kindy". Both Muir and van Koningsveld favour a ninth-century date for the Apology. Muir is more specific about the date, identifying the Caliph, who remains unnamed in the epistles, as Al-Ma'mun, who reigned from 813 to 833. Muir argues that the epistles were written at his court because of:

- "the manner in which the Caliph is throughout referred to..."
- the "political allusions" contained in the book...
- the "freedom of our Author's treatment of Islam"...

=== Opposing views ===
The dating proposed by Muir has also been disputed with it being the object of serious disagreements between orientalists. L. Massignon believes the composition to be later than Muir's suggestion, suggesting the 4th century hijri (10th century CE), arguing that the author borrowed from al-Tabari (d. 310 AH/923 CE) his criticism of the Hanbali al-Barbahari (d. 329 AH/940 CE). Arguing for a parallel between criticisms contained in the letter and in the work of the Muslim heretic Ibn al-Rawandi (d. 298 AH/910 CE), Paul Kraus concludes that the Christian author took these criticisms from al-Rawandi and therefore he argues the letter was composed at the beginning of the 4th AH/10th CE century, agreeing with Massignon.

Scholars continue to argue as to whether the letters derive from actual persons or represent a work of fiction by a single author.

== See also ==
- Latin translations of the 12th century
- Newman, N. A. The Early Christian-Muslim Dialogue: A Collection of Documents from the First Three Islamic Centuries, 632-900 A.D.: Translations with Commentary. Hatfield, PA: Interdisciplinary Biblical Research Institute, 1993, pages 355–545.
