= Abu Ali al-Khayyat =

Medieval Arab astrologer

- أبو علي الخياط
- Born: c. 770
- Died: c. 835
- Occupation: Astrologer

Abu Ali al-Khayyat (Arabic: أبو علي الخياط; c. 153 – 220 AH (c. 770 – c. 835 CE)), often called by the Latin title Albohali in western sources, (also called Albohali Alghihac, Albohali Alchait or Albenahait), was an Arab astrologer and a student of the astrologer and astronomer Mashallah ibn Athari.

Al-Khayyat's Kitāb al-Mawālid was translated in 1136 and 1153, and was reprinted in Nuremberg in 1546. His Kitāb Sirr al-ʿamal appeared in the 12th century Book of Nine Judges.

== Biography ==
Abu Ali al-Khayyat, known in the West as Albohali, was born in c. 770. He was an Arab astrologer and a student of the astrologer and astronomer Mashallah ibn Athari.

He died in c. 835.

== Works ==
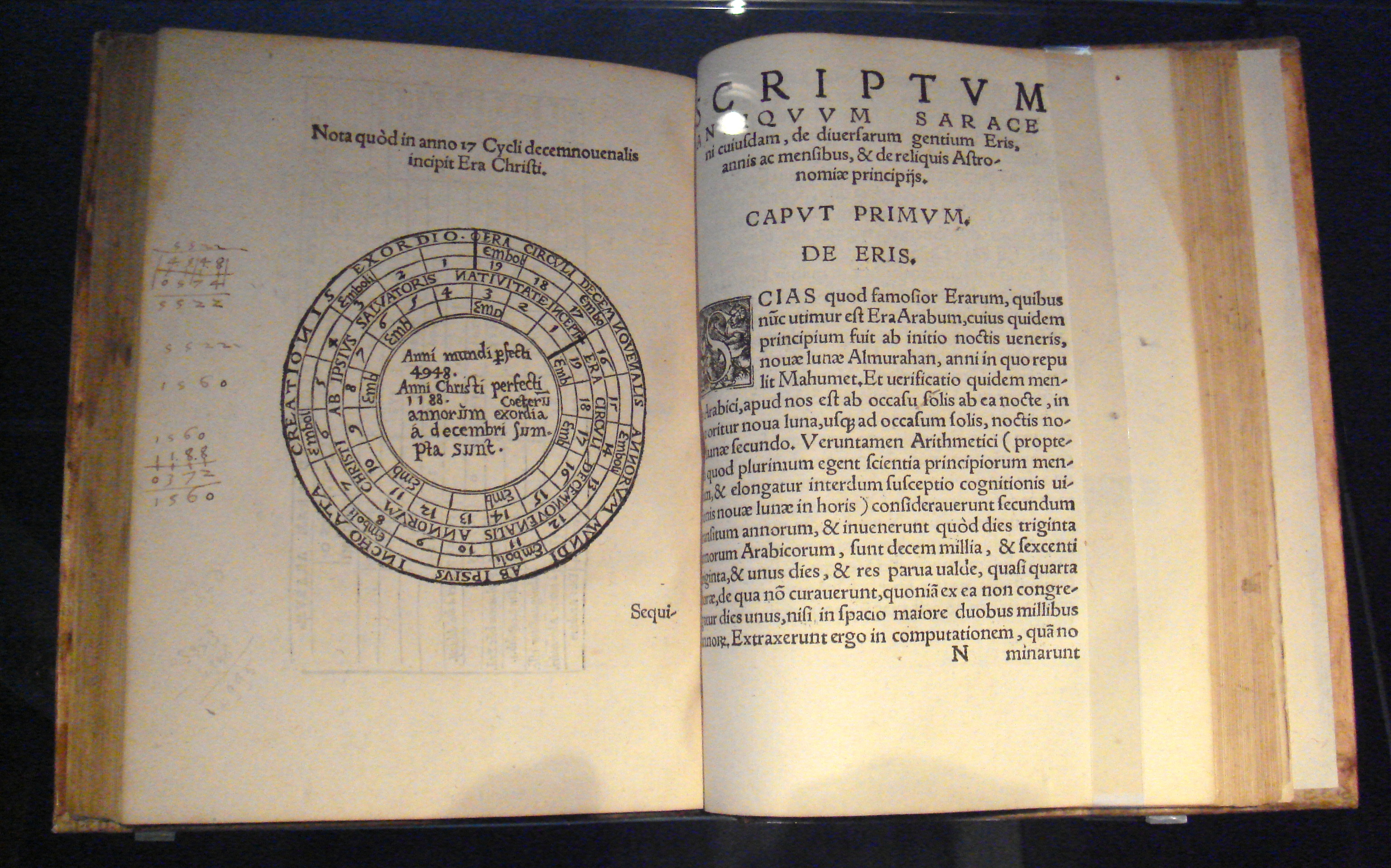
Albohali's De Iudiciis Natiuitatum, published in Nuremberg (1546), Institut du Monde Arabe

Al-Khayyat's Kitāb al-Mawālid ("Book of Birth") was translated into Latin by Plato Tiburtinus in 1136, and again by Johannes Hispalensis in 1153, the latter being printed in Nuremberg in 1546 under the title Albohali Arabis astrologi antiquissimi ac clarissimi de iudiciis nativitatum liber unus antehac non editus. Cum privilegio D. Iohanni Shonero concesso.

Elements of his Kitāb Sirr al-ʿamal ("Book of the secret action"), were republished in the 12th century Book of Nine Judges, compiled by Hugo of Santalla. The material has been described as being largely taken from the work of Mashalla, but in several places borrowing from the work of the Persian astrologer Omar Tiberiades.

== See also ==
- Latin translations of the 12th century

== Sources ==
- van Donzel, E. J. Van (1994). Islamic Desk Reference. Leiden: Brill Publishers. ISBN 978-90-04-09738-4.
- Dykes, Benjamin N. (2011). The Book of Nine Judges. Translated by Dykes, Benjamin N. Minneapolis, Minnesota: Cazimi Press. ISBN 978-19345-8-620-4.
- Houtsma, Martijn Theodoor; et al., eds. (1987). E.J. Brill's First Encyclopaedia of Islam 1913-1936. Vol. 4. Leiden: Brill Publishers. ISBN 978-90-04-08265-6.
