= Peter of Poitiers (secretary) =

12th-century monk and secretary to Peter the Venerable

Peter of Poitiers was a monk who served as secretary (Latin: notarius) to Peter the Venerable, the ninth abbot of Cluny. Little is known of his life. Presumably he came from the French city of Poitiers or its vicinity.

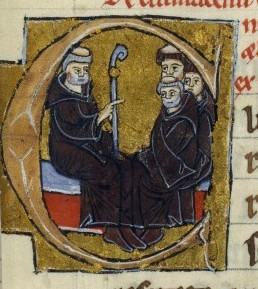
There is no known portrait of Peter of Poitiers, but here is his abbot Peter the Venerable with other monks, 13th century illuminated manuscript.

== Translating career ==
From 1142 to 1143 he worked in a team recruited by Peter the Venerable which translated Arabic texts into Latin. Their work, the Corpus Cluniacense, is best remembered for including the first translation of the Qur'an into a European language. Peter the Venerable's correspondence indicates that Peter of Poitiers was employed in the team because of his command of Latin: there is no evidence that he knew Arabic.

Peter of Poitiers and Peter the Venerable visited Spain in 1142. Although the translation project was not necessarily the primary reason for the abbot's presence in Spain, he took advantage of the fact that the country was an important centre for translations from the Arabic. Several translators based in Spain were recruited: a couple of them were proficient in Latin, including Robert of Ketton, the principal translator of the Qur'an. One of the translators, Peter of Toledo, who worked on the Apology of al-Kindy, is known to have required assistance from Peter of Poitiers because his knowledge of Latin was deficient. Peter of Poitiers may well have polished all the texts.

== See also ==
- Apology of al-Kindy (book)
- Latin translations of the 12th century
