= Gerland =

Gerland may refer to:

== People ==
- Saint Gerland of Agrigento (died 1100), bishop of Agrigento, Sicily
- Gerland (mathematician), 11th-century English mathematician

== People with the surname ==
- Georg Gerland (1833–1919), German anthropologist and geophysicist
- Gunilla Gerland (born 1963), Swedish writer and activist
- Hermann Gerland (born 1954), German football player and manager
- Karl Gerland (1905–1945), Nazi leader

== Places ==
- Gerland, Lyon, a quarter of Lyon, France
- Gerland, Côte-d'Or, a commune in France
- Parc de Gerland, a park in Lyon, France

== Other uses ==
- Gerland Corporation, an American retail company
