= Latin translations of the 12th century =

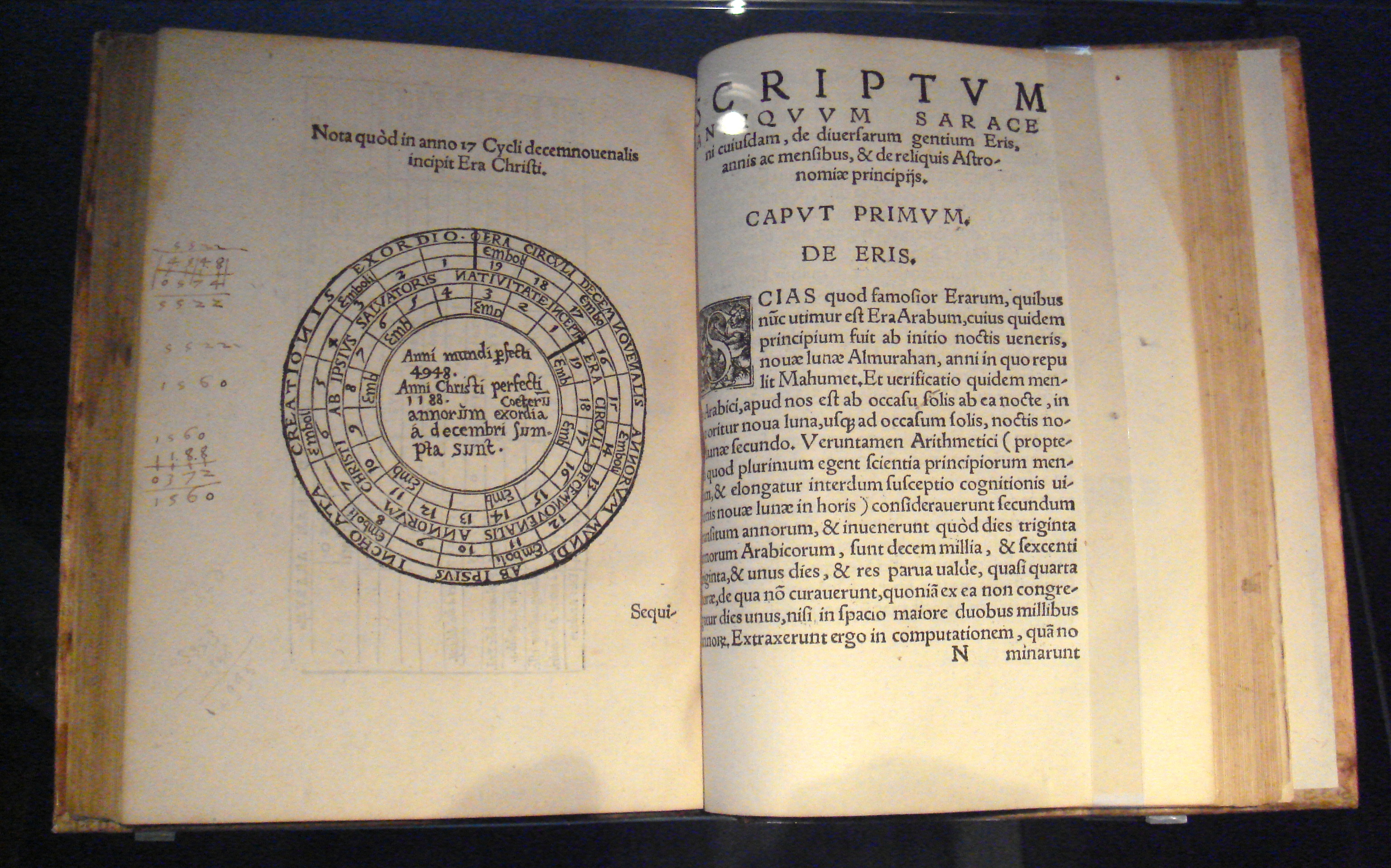
Albohali's De Iudiciis Natiuitatum was translated into Latin by Plato of Tivoli in 1136, and again by John of Seville in 1153. Here is the Nuremberg edition of John of Seville's translation, 1546.

Latin translations of the 12th century were spurred by a major search by European scholars for new learning unavailable in western Europe at the time; their search led them to areas of southern Europe, particularly in central Spain and Sicily, which recently had come under Christian rule following their reconquest in the late 11th century. These areas had been under Muslim rule for a considerable time, and still had substantial Arabic-speaking populations to support their search. The combination of this accumulated knowledge and the substantial numbers of Arabic-speaking scholars there made these areas intellectually attractive, as well as culturally and politically accessible to Latin scholars. A typical story is that of Gerard of Cremona (c. 1114–87), who is said to have made his way to Toledo, well after its reconquest by Christians in 1085, because he:

arrived at a knowledge of each part of [philosophy] according to the study of the Latins, nevertheless, because of his love for the Almagest, which he did not find at all amongst the Latins, he made his way to Toledo, where seeing an abundance of books in Arabic on every subject, and pitying the poverty he had experienced among the Latins concerning these subjects, out of his desire to translate he thoroughly learnt the Arabic language.

Many Christian theologians were highly suspicious of ancient philosophies and especially of the attempts to synthesize them with Christian doctrines. St. Jerome, for example, was hostile to Aristotle, and St. Augustine had little interest in exploring philosophy, only applying logic to theology. For centuries, ancient Greek ideas in Western Europe were all but non-existent. Only a few monasteries had Greek works, and even fewer of them copied these works.

There was a brief period of revival, when the Anglo-Saxon monk Alcuin and others reintroduced some Greek ideas during the Carolingian Renaissance. After Charlemagne's death, however, intellectual life again fell into decline. Excepting a few persons promoting Boethius, such as Gerbert of Aurillac, philosophical thought was developed little in Europe for about two centuries. By the 12th century, however, scholastic thought was beginning to develop, leading to the rise of universities throughout Europe. These universities gathered what little Greek thought had been preserved over the centuries, including Boethius' commentaries on Aristotle. They also served as places of discussion for new ideas coming from new translations from Arabic throughout Europe.

By the 12th century, Toledo, in Spain, had fallen from Arab hands in 1085, Sicily in 1091, and Jerusalem in 1099. The small population of the Crusader Kingdoms contributed very little to the translation efforts, though Sicily, still largely Greek-speaking, was more productive. Sicilians, however, were less influenced by Arabic than the other regions and instead are noted more for their translations directly from Greek to Latin. Spain, on the other hand, was an ideal place for translation from Arabic to Latin because of a combination of rich Latin and Arab cultures living side by side.

Unlike the interest in the literature and history of classical antiquity during the Renaissance, 12th century translators sought new scientific, philosophical and, to a lesser extent, religious texts. The latter concern was reflected in a renewed interest in translations of the Greek Church Fathers into Latin, a concern with translating Jewish teachings from Hebrew, and an interest in the Qur'an and other Islamic religious texts. In addition, some Arabic literature was also translated into Latin.

== Translators in Italy ==
Just before the burst of translations in the 12th century, Constantine the African, a Christian from Carthage who studied medicine in Egypt and ultimately became a monk at the monastery of Monte Cassino in Italy, translated medical works from Arabic. Constantine's many translations included Ali ibn Abbas al-Majusi's medical encyclopedia The Complete Book of the Medical Art (as Liber Pantegni), the ancient medicine of Hippocrates and Galen as adapted by Arabic physicians, and the Isagoge ad Tegni Galeni by Hunayn ibn Ishaq (Johannitius) and his nephew Hubaysh ibn al-Hasan. Other medical works he translated include Isaac Israeli ben Solomon's Liber Febribus, Liber de Dietis universalibus et particularibus and Liber de Urinis; Ishaq ibn Imran's psychological work al-Maqala fi al-Malikhukiya as De Melancolia; and Ibn al-Jazzar's De Gradibus, Viaticum, Liber de Stomacho, De Elephantiasi, De Coitu and De Oblivione.

Sicily had been part of the Byzantine Empire until 878, was under Muslim control from 878–1060, and came under Norman control between 1060 and 1090. As a consequence the Norman Kingdom of Sicily maintained a trilingual bureaucracy, which made it an ideal place for translations. Sicily also maintained relations with the Greek East, which allowed for exchange of ideas and manuscripts.

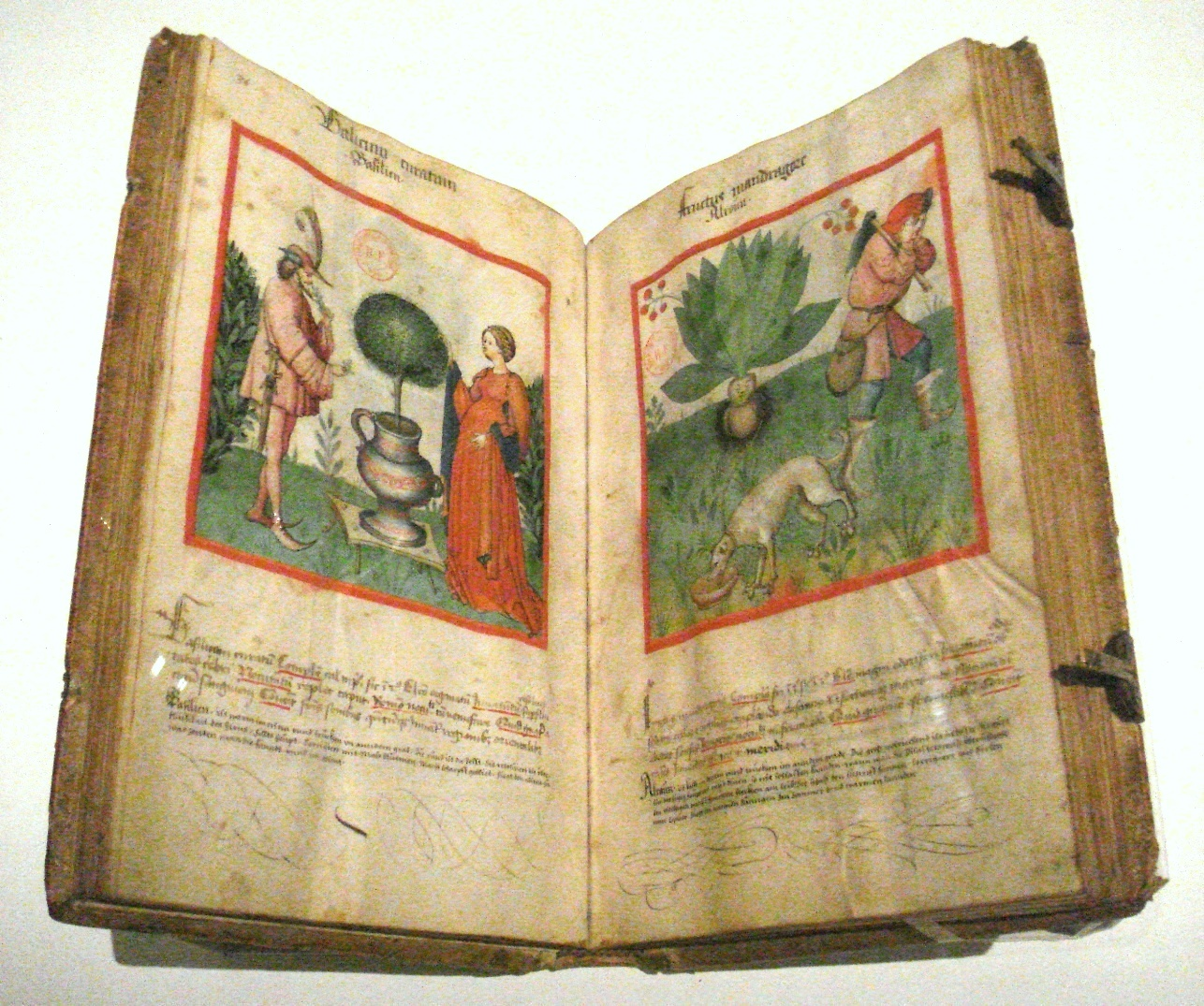
Ibn Butlan's Tacuinum sanitatis, Rhineland, 2nd half of the 15th century.

A copy of Ptolemy's Almagest was brought back to Sicily by Henry Aristippus, as a gift from the Emperor to King William I. Aristippus, himself, translated Plato's Meno and Phaedo into Latin, but it was left to an anonymous student at Salerno to travel to Sicily and translate the Almagest, as well as several works by Euclid, from Greek to Latin. Although the Sicilians generally translated directly from the Greek, when Greek texts were not available, they would translate from Arabic. Admiral Eugene of Sicily translated Ptolemy's Optics into Latin, drawing on his knowledge of all three languages in the task. Accursius of Pistoja's translations included the works of Galen and Hunayn ibn Ishaq. Gerard de Sabloneta translated Avicenna's The Canon of Medicine and al-Razi's Almansor. Fibonacci presented the first complete European account of the Hindu–Arabic numeral system from Arabic sources in his Liber Abaci (1202). The Aphorismi by Masawaiyh (Mesue) was translated by an anonymous translator in late 11th or early 12th century Italy.

James of Venice, who probably spent some years in Constantinople, translated Aristotle's Posterior Analytics from Greek into Latin in the mid-12th century, thus making the complete Aristotelian logical corpus, the Organon, available in Latin for the first time.

In 13th century Padua, Bonacosa translated Averroes' medical work Kitab al-Kulliyyat as Colliget, and John of Capua translated the Kitab al-Taysir by Ibn Zuhr (Avenzoar) as Theisir. In 13th century Sicily, Faraj ben Salem translated Rhazes' al-Hawi as Continens as well as Ibn Butlan's Tacuinum Sanitatis. Also in 13th century Italy, Simon of Genoa and Abraham Tortuensis translated Abulcasis' Al-Tasrif as Liber Servitoris, Alcoati's Congregatio sive Liber de Oculis, and the Liber de Simplicibus Medicamentis by a pseudo-Serapion

== Translators on the Spanish frontier ==
As early as the end of the 10th century, European scholars travelled to Spain to study. Most notable among these was Gerbert of Aurillac (later Pope Sylvester II) who studied mathematics in the region of the Spanish March around Barcelona. Translations, however, did not begin in Spain until after 1085 when Toledo was reconquered by Christians. The early translators in Spain focused heavily on scientific works, especially mathematics and astronomy, with a second area of interest including the Qur'an and other Islamic texts. Spanish collections included many scholarly works written in Arabic, so translators worked almost exclusively from Arabic, rather than Greek texts, often in cooperation with a local speaker of Arabic.

One of the more important translation projects was sponsored by Peter the Venerable, the abbot of Cluny. In 1142 he called upon Robert of Ketton and Herman of Carinthia, Peter of Poitiers, and a Muslim known only as "Mohammed" to produce the first Latin translation of the Qur'an (the Lex Mahumet pseudoprophete).

Translations were produced throughout Spain and Provence. Plato of Tivoli worked in Catalonia, Herman of Carinthia in Northern Spain and across the Pyrenees in Languedoc, Hugh of Santalla in Aragon, Robert of Ketton in Navarre and Robert of Chester in Segovia. The most important center of translation was the great cathedral library of Toledo.

Plato of Tivoli's translations into Latin include al-Battani's astronomical and trigonometrical work De Motu Stellarum, Abraham bar Hiyya's Liber Embadorum, Theodosius of Bithynia's Spherics, and Archimedes' Measurement of a Circle. Robert of Chester's translations into Latin included al-Khwarizmi's Algebra and astronomical tables (also containing trigonometric tables). Abraham of Tortosa's translations include Serapion the Younger's Liber de Simplicibus Medicamentis and Abulcasis' al-Tasrif as Liber Servitoris. In 1126, Muhammad al-Fazari's Great Sindhind (based on the Sanskrit works of Surya Siddhanta and Brahmagupta's Brāhmasphuṭasiddhānta) was translated into Latin.

In addition to philosophical and scientific literature, the Jewish writer Petrus Alphonsi translated a collection of 33 tales from Arabic literature into Latin. Some of the tales he drew on were from the Panchatantra and Arabian Nights, such as the story cycle of "Sinbad the Sailor". The Pseudo-Platonic Book of the Cow, a 9th-century Arabic work on natural magic, was translated into Latin in the 12th century, probably in Spain.

=== The Toledo School of Translators ===
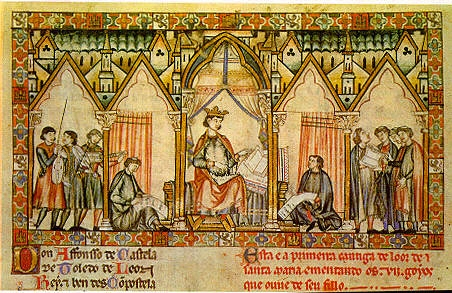
King Alfonso X (the Wise)

Toledo, with a large population of Arabic-speaking Christians (Mozarabs) had been an important center of learning since as early as the end of the 10th century, when European scholars traveled to Spain to study subjects that were not readily available in the rest of Europe. Among the early translators at Toledo were an Avendauth (who some have identified with Abraham ibn Daud), who translated Avicenna's encyclopedia, the Kitāb al-Shifa (The Book of Healing), in cooperation with Domingo Gundisalvo, Archdeacon of Cuéllar. The translating efforts at Toledo are often overemphasized into a “school of translation,” however the representation of Toledo translating activity creates a false sense that a formal school arose around the Archbishop Raymond. Only one translation, by John of Seville, can be definitively dedicated to the archbishop. It is more accurate to consider Toledo as a geographically bilingual environment where local interests were favorable to translation efforts, making it a practical and appealing location for translators to work. As a result, many translators became active in the area and Toledo became the focus of translating activity.

However translating efforts were not properly organized until Toledo was reconquered by the Christian forces in 1085. Raymond of Toledo started the first translation efforts at the library of the Cathedral of Toledo, where he led a team of translators that included Mozarabic Toledans, Jewish scholars, Madrasa teachers and monks from the Order of Cluny. They worked in the translation of many works from Arabic into Castilian, from Castilian into Latin, or directly from Arabic into Latin or Greek, and also made available important texts from Arabic and Hebrew philosophers who the Archbishop deemed important for an understanding of Aristotle. As a result of their activities, the cathedral became a translations center known as the Escuela de Traductores de Toledo (Toledo School of Translators), which was on a scale and importance not matched in the history of western culture.

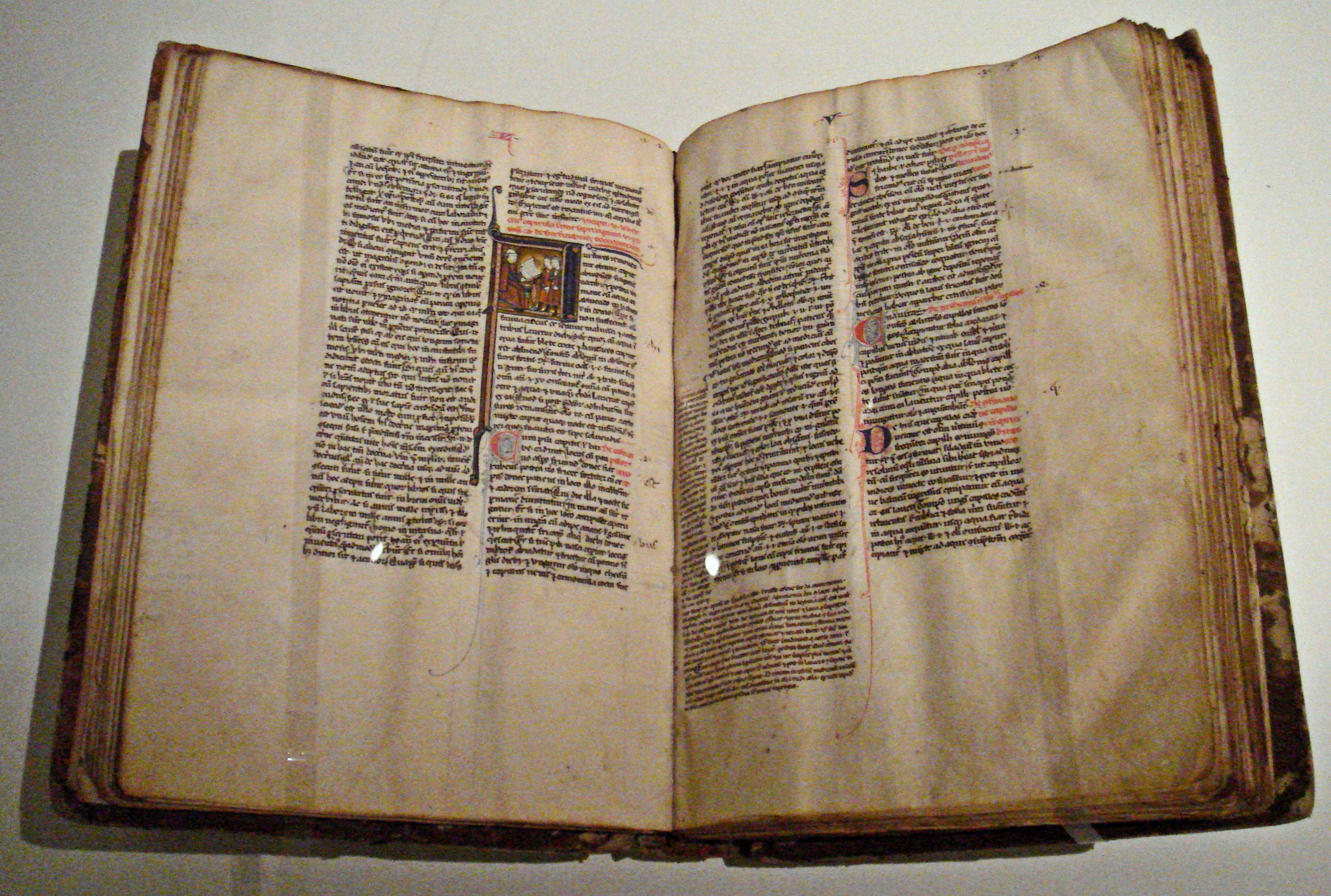
Al-Razi's Recueil des traités de médecine translated by Gerard of Cremona, second half of the 13th century.

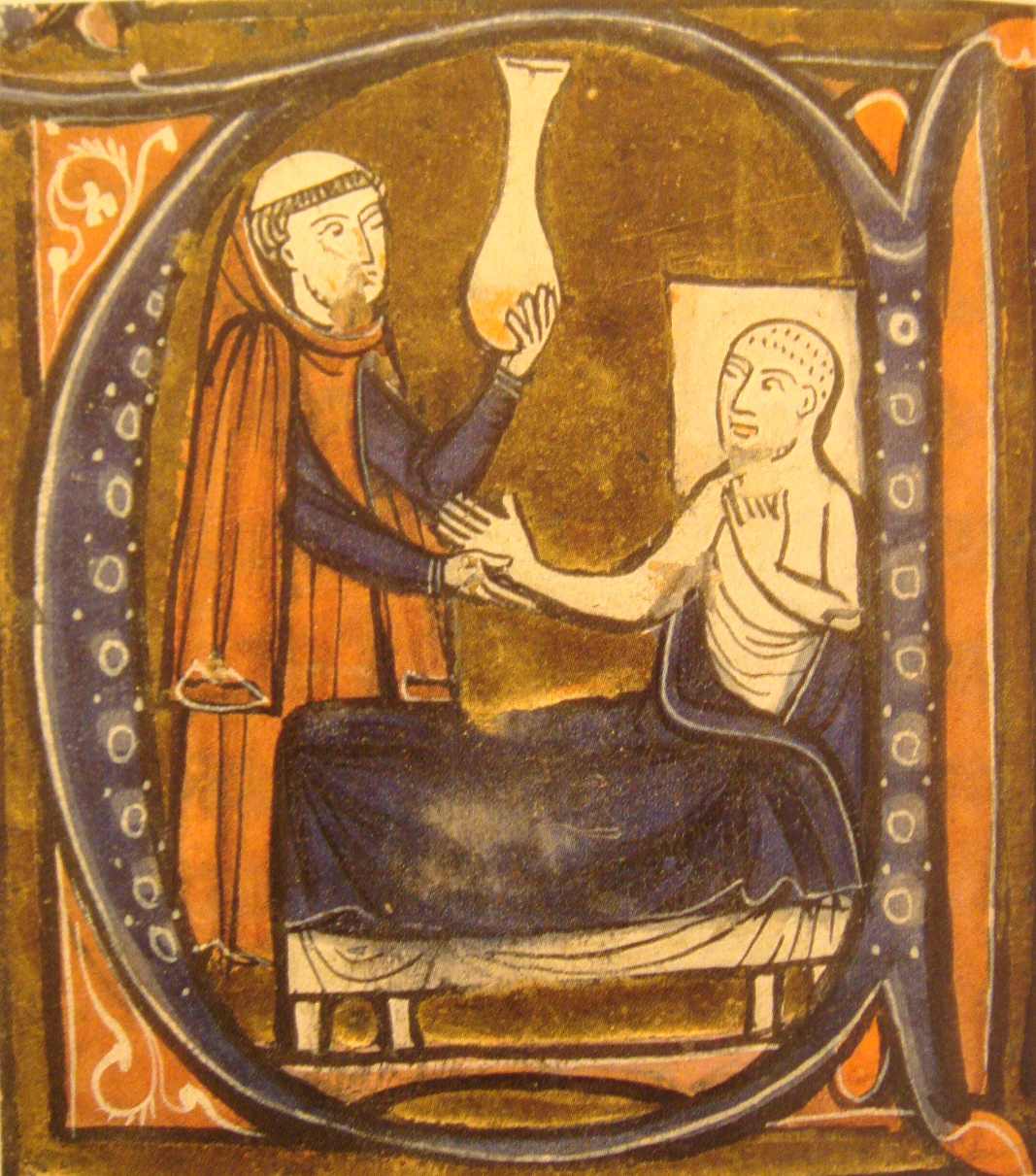
Depiction of the Persian physician al-Razi, in Gerard of Cremona's "Recueil des traités de medecine" 1250–1260.

The most productive of the Toledo translators at that time was Gerard of Cremona, who translated 87 books, including Ptolemy's Almagest, many of the works of Aristotle, including his Posterior Analytics, Physics, On the Heavens, On Generation and Corruption, and Meteorology, al-Khwarizmi's On Algebra and Almucabala, Archimedes' On the Measurement of the Circle, Euclid's Elements of Geometry, Jabir ibn Aflah's Elementa Astronomica, al-Kindi's On Optics, al-Farghani's On Elements of Astronomy on the Celestial Motions, al-Farabi's On the Classification of the Sciences, the chemical and medical works of al-Razi (Rhazes), the works of Thabit ibn Qurra and Hunayn ibn Ishaq, and the works of al-Zarqali, Jabir ibn Aflah, the Banu Musa, Abu Kamil, Abu al-Qasim al-Zahrawi, and Ibn al-Haytham (Not including the Book of Optics, because the catalog of the works of Gerard of Cremona does not list that title; however the Risner compilation of Opticae Thesaurus Septem Libri also includes a work by Witelo and also de Crepusculis, which Risner incorrectly attributed to Alhazen, and which was translated by Gerard of Cremona). The medical works he translated include Haly Abenrudian's Expositio ad Tegni Galeni; Practica, Brevarium Medicine by Yuhanna ibn Sarabiyun (Serapion); Alkindus' De Gradibus; Rhazes' Liber ad Almansorem, Liber Divisionum, Introductio in Medicinam, De egritudinibus iuncturarum, Antidotarium and Practica Puerorum; Isaac Israeli ben Solomon's De Elementis and De Definitionibus; Abulcasis' Al-Tasrif as Chirurgia; Avicenna's The Canon of Medicine as Liber Canonis; and Liber de Medicamentis Simplicus by Abenguefit. At the close of the 12th and the beginning of the 13th centuries, Mark of Toledo translated the Qur'an (once again) and various medical works. He also translated Hunayn ibn Ishaq's medical work Liber Isagogarum.

Under King Alfonso X of Castile, Toledo rose even higher in importance as a translation center. By insisting that the translated output was "llanos de entender" ("easy to understand"), they reached a much wider audience both within Spain and in other European countries, as many scholars from places like Italy, Germany, England or the Netherlands, who had moved to Toledo in order to translate medical, religious, classical and philosophical texts, brought back to their countries the acquired knowledge. Others were selected and hired with very high salaries by the King himself from many places in Spain, like Seville or Córdoba and foreign places like Gascony or Paris.

Michael Scot (c. 1175–1232) translated the works of (Alpetragius) al-Betrugi' On the Motions of the Heavens in 1217, and Averroes' influential commentaries on the scientific works of Aristotle.

=== Later translators ===
David the Jew (c. 1228–1245) translated the works of al-Razi (Rhazes) into Latin. Arnaldus de Villa Nova's (1235–1313) translations include the works of Galen and Avicenna (Including his Maqala fi Ahkam al-Adwiya al-Qalbiya as De Viribus Cordis), the De Medicinis Simplicibus by Abu al-Salt (Albuzali), and Costa ben Luca's De Physicis Ligaturis.

In 13th century Portugal, Giles of Santarém translated Rhazes' De Secretis Medicine, Aphorismi Rasis and Mesue's De Secretis Medicine. In Murcia, Rufin of Alexandria translated the Liber questionum medicinalium discentium in medicina by Hunayn ibn Ishaq (Hunen), and Dominicus Marrochinus translated the Epistola de cognitione infirmatum oculorum by Ali Ibn Isa (Jesu Haly). In 14th century Lerida, John Jacobi translated Alcoati's medical work Libre de la figura del uyl into Catalan and then Latin.

Willem van Moerbeke, known in the English speaking world as William of Moerbeke (c. 1215–1286) was a prolific medieval translator of philosophical, medical, and scientific texts from Greek into Latin. At the request of Aquinas, so it is assumed—the source document is not clear—he undertook a complete translation of the works of Aristotle or, for some portions, a revision of existing translations. He was the first translator of the Politics (c. 1260) from Greek into Latin. The reason for the request was that the many copies of Aristotle in Latin then in circulation had originated in Spain (see Gerard of Cremona). These earlier translations were assumed to have been influenced by the rationalist Averroes, who was suspected of being a source of philosophical and theological errors found in the earlier translations of Aristotle. Moerbeke's translations have had a long history; they were already standard classics by the 14th century, when Henricus Hervodius put his finger on their enduring value: they were literal (de verbo in verbo), faithful to the spirit of Aristotle and without elegance. For several of William's translations, the Greek texts have since disappeared, without him the works would be lost. William also translated mathematical treatises by Hero of Alexandria and Archimedes. Especially important was his translation of the Elements of Theology of Proclus (made in 1268), because the Elements of Theology is one of the fundamental sources of the revived Neo-Platonic philosophical currents of the 13th century. The Vatican collection holds William's own copy of the translation he made of the greatest Hellenistic mathematician, Archimedes, with commentaries of Eutocius, which was made in 1269 at the papal court in Viterbo. William consulted two of the best Greek manuscripts of Archimedes, both of which have since disappeared.

== Other European translators ==
Adelard of Bath's (fl. 1116–1142) translations into Latin included al-Khwarizmi's astronomical and trigonometrical work Astronomical Tables and his arithmetical work Liber Isagogarum Alchorismi, the Introduction to Astrology of Abu Ma'shar, as well as Euclid's Elements. Adelard associated with other scholars in Western England such as Peter Alfonsi and Walcher of Malvern who translated and developed the astronomical concepts brought from Spain. Abu Kamil's Algebra was also translated into Latin during this period, but the translator of the work is unknown.

Alfred of Sareshel's (c. 1200–1227) translations include the works of Nicolaus of Damascus and Hunayn ibn Ishaq. Antonius Frachentius Vicentinus' translations include the works of Ibn Sina (Avicenna). Armengaud Blaise's translations include the works of Avicenna, Averroes, Hunayn ibn Ishaq, and Maimonides. Berengarius of Valentia translated the works of Abu al-Qasim al-Zahrawi (Abulcasis). Drogon (Azagont) translated the works of al-Kindi. Farragut (Faradj ben Salam) translated the works of Hunayn ibn Ishaq, ibn Zezla (Byngezla), Masawaiyh (Mesue), and al-Razi (Rhazes). Andreas Alphagus Bellnensis' translations include the works of Avicenna, Averroes, Serapion, al-Qifti, and Albe'thar.

In 13th century Montpellier, Profatius and Bernardus Honofredi translated the Kitab al-Aghdhiya by Ibn Zuhr (Avenzoar) as De regimine sanitatis; and Armengaud translated the al-Urjuza fi al-Tibb, a work combining the medical writings of Avicenna and Averroes, as Cantica cum commento.

Other texts translated during this period include a number of alchemical works, the first of which appears to have been the Liber de compositione alchemiae ("Book on the Composition of Alchemy"), translated by Robert of Chester in 1144 and containing a dialogue between Morienus and Khālid ibn Yazīd. Also notable are translations from alchemical works attributed to Jabir ibn Hayyan (Geber), such as the Book of the Seventy (Arabic: Kitāb al-Sabʿīn, translated by Gerard of Cremona, before 1187, as Liber de Septuaginta), The Great Book of Mercy (Arabic: Kitāb al-Raḥma al-Kabīr, anonymously translated as Liber Misericordiae), and The Book of the Kingship (Arabic: Kitāb al-Mulk, translated as Liber Regni). Another work translated during this period was De Proprietatibus Elementorum, an Arabic work on geology written by a pseudo-Aristotle. A pseudo-Mesue's De consolatione medicanarum simplicum, Antidotarium, was also translated into Latin by an anonymous translator.

== Vernacular languages ==
In the 12th century in southern France and Italy, many Arabic scientific texts were translated into Hebrew. France and Italy had large Jewish communities where there was little knowledge of Arabic, requiring translations to provide access to Arabic science. The translation of Arabic texts into Hebrew was used by translators, such as Profatius Judaeus, as an intermediate step between translation from Arabic into Latin. This practice was most widely used from the thirteenth to the sixteenth centuries.

== List of translations ==
This list is of translations after c. 1100 of works written originally in Greek.

- Hippocrates and school (5th, 4th centuries B.C.)
  - Aphorisms: Burgundio of Pisa, from Greek, 12th century
  - Various treatises: Gerard of Cremona and others, from Arabic, Toledo 12th century
  - William of Moerbeke, from Greek, after 1260
- Aristotle (384-322 B.C.)
  - Posterior Analytics (a founding document of the logica nova): two versions from Greek, 12th century; from Arabic, Toledo 12th century
  - Meteorologica (Book 4): Henricus Aristippus, from Greek, Sicily c. 1156
  - Physica, De Generatione et Corruptione, Parva Naturalia, Metaphysica (first 4 books), De Anima, from Greek, 12th century
  - Meteorologica (Books 1-3), Physica, De Cælo et Mundo, De Generatione et Corruptione: Gerard of Cremona, from Arabic, Toledo 12th century
  - De Animalibus (Historia Animalium, De Partibus Animalium, De Generatione Animalium): Michael Scot, from a 9th-century Arabic translation, Spain c. 1217-20
  - Almost complete works: William of Moerbeke, new or revised translations from Greek c. 1260-71
- Euclid (c. 330-260 B.C.)
  - Elements (15 books, 13 genuine): Adelard of Bath from Arabic, c. 1126; revised by Campanus of Novara, c. 1254
  - Optica and Catoptrica: from Greek, probably Sicily
- Apollonius (3rd century B.C.)
  - Conica: perhaps Gerard of Cremona, from Arabic, 12th century
- Archimedes (287-212 B.C.)
  - De Mensura Circuli: Gerard of Cremona, from Arabic, Toledo 12th century
  - De Iis quæ in Humido Vehuntur (On Floating Bodies): William of Moerbeke from Greek 1269
- Diocles ( 2nd century B.C.)
  - De Speculis Comburentibus (On Burning Mirrors): Gerard of Cremona, from Arabic, Toledo 12th century
- Hero of Alexandria (1st century B.C.?)
  - Pneumatica: from Greek, Sicily 12th century
  - Catoptrica (attributed to Ptolemy in Middle Ages): William of Moerbeke, from Greek, after 1260
- Pseudo-Aristotle
  - Mechanica: from Greek, early 13th century; Bartholomew of Messina, from Greek, Sicily c.1260
  - De Plantis or De Vegetabilibus (now attributed to Nicolaus of Damascus, 1st century B.C.): Alfred of Sareshel, from Arabic, Spain probably before 1200
- Pseudo-Euclid
  - Liber Euclidis de Ponderoso et Levi (on statics): from Arabic, 12th century
- Galen (129-200 A.D.)
  - Various treatises: Burgundio of Pisa, from Greek, c. 1185
  - Various treatises: Gerard of Cremona and others, from Arabic, Toledo 12th century
  - Various treatises: William of Moerbeke, from Greek, 1277
- Ptolemy (2nd century A.D.)
  - Almagest: from Greek, Sicily c. 1160; Gerard of Cremona, from Arabic, Toledo 1175
  - Optica: Eugenius of Palermo, from Arabic, c. 1154
- Alexander of Aphrodisias (fl. 193 -217 A.D.)
  - Commentary on the Meteorologica: William of Moerbeke, from Greek, 13th century
  - De Motu et Tempore: Gerard of Cremona, from Arabic, Toledo 12th century
- Proclus (412-485 A.D.)
  - Elements of Physics (De motu): from Greek, Sicily 12th century
  - Elements of Theology: William of Moerbeke, from Greek, 1268
  - Three opuscules (On Providence, On Providence and Fate, and On the Existence of Evils): William of Moerbeke, from Greek, 13th century
  - Commentary on Plato's Parmenides: William of Moerbeke, from Greek, 13th century
- Simplicius (6th century A.D.)
  - Part of Commentary on Aristotle's De Cælo: Robert Grosseteste, from Greek, 13th century
  - Commentary on Aristotle's Physica: from Greek, 13th century
  - Commentary on Aristotle's De Cælo: William of Moerbeke, from Greek, 1271
  - Commentary on Aristotle's Categories: William of Moerbeke, from Greek, 13th century

== See also ==
- Toledo School of Translators
- Renaissance of the 12th century
- Islamic world contributions to Medieval Europe
- Lex Mahumet pseudoprophete
- List of translators
- Graeco-Arabic translation movement
