= Logica nova =

Historical subfield of logic, 12th-century

In the history of logic, the term logica nova (Latin, meaning "new logic") refers to a subdivision of the logical tradition of Western Europe, as it existed around the middle of the twelfth century. The Logica vetus ("old logic") referred to works of Aristotle that had long been known and studied in the Latin West, whereas the Logica nova referred to forms of logic derived from Aristotle's works which had been unavailable until they were translated by James of Venice in the 12th century. Study of the Logica nova was part of the Renaissance of the 12th century.

== Overview ==
The division of works was as follows:

- Logica vetus (sometimes ars vetus)
  - The Categories
  - The De Interpretatione
  - The Isagoge of Porphyry
  - The Liber sex principiorum, an anonymous commentary on the latter part of the Categories that has often been attributed to Gilbert de la Porrée
- Sometimes included are works of Boethius
  - The De topicis differentiis
  - The De divisione
  - The De syllogismis categoricis
  - The De syllogismis hypotheticis.

These works, excluding the Liber sex principiorum, were already canonical in the time of Abelard. He wrote his so-called Logica Ingredientibus on the scheme of a set of seven commentaries.

- Logica nova
  - Prior Analytics
  - Posterior Analytics
  - Topics
  - Sophismata.

The advent of the logica nova was the result of new Latin translations, particularly by James of Venice. The combination of the two logics was termed the logica antiquorum (logic of the ancients). Restricting just to the works of Aristotle, the whole Organon of six works was split by the historical accidents of transmission into two books in the logica vetus, and four in the logica nova.

Some of the religious orders organized special studia for the formation of their members dedicated to the study of the new logic. For example, after the theology component of the studium provinciale of the Dominican Order at the Roman convent of Santa Sabina was transferred in 1288 to the convent of Santa Maria sopra Minerva, which would develop into the College of Saint Thomas in the 15th century and into the Pontifical University of Saint Thomas Aquinas, Angelicum, the Santa Sabina studium was redesignated in 1291 as one of three studia nove logice of the Order. These studia were intended to offer courses of advanced logic covering the logica nova, the Aristotelian texts recovered in the West only in the second half of the 12th century, the Topics, Sophistical Refutations, and the First and Second Analytics of Aristotle. This was an advance over the logica antiqua, which treated the Isagoge of Porphyry, Divisions and Topics of Boethius, the Categories and On Interpretation of Aristotle, and the Summule logicales of Peter of Spain. Milone da Velletri was lector there in 1293 In 1310 the Florentine Giovanni dei Tornaquinci was lector there. In 1331 Nerius de Tertia was lector, and Giovanni Zocco da Spoleto was a student of logic there.

Another usage for logica nova is for the later theories of Ramón Lull. The logica parva refers to an important textbook of Paul of Venice.

The terminology had some currency at least until the seventeenth century, and Johannes Clauberg's Logica vetus et nova (1654).

== See also ==
- Latin translations of the 12th century
- Term logic
