= James of Venice =

12th-century scholar

James of Venice (Latin: Jacobus de Venetia or de Venetiis; Italian: Giacomo da Venezia) or James the Venetian (Latin: Jacobus Veneticus; died c. 1147) was a Venetian Catholic cleric who travelled to the Byzantine Empire and was a significant translator of Aristotle during the 12th-Century Renaissance.

James identified as "Jacobus Veneticus Grecus [sic] philosophus". The epithet "Grecus" could indicate his knowledge of the Greek language, his long stay in Constantinople, or that he was of Greek descent. Prior to James, Aristotle was known in Western Europe primarily through the Latin commentaries on his work by Boethius. "The first systematic translator of Aristotle since Boethius", James was active in Constantinople, working directly from Byzantine Greek copies of philosophical texts rather than the Arab translations used by the Christian scholars in Spain around the same time.

James translated the Posterior Analytics from Greek to Latin in the period 1125–1150. For the first time in over 500 years, this made the New Logic of the Organon available in Western Europe. James also translated Aristotle's Physics, On the Soul, and Metaphysics (the oldest known Latin translation of the work).

== See also ==
- Latin translations of the 12th century
- Logica nova
