= Theodore Bibliander =

Swiss publisher

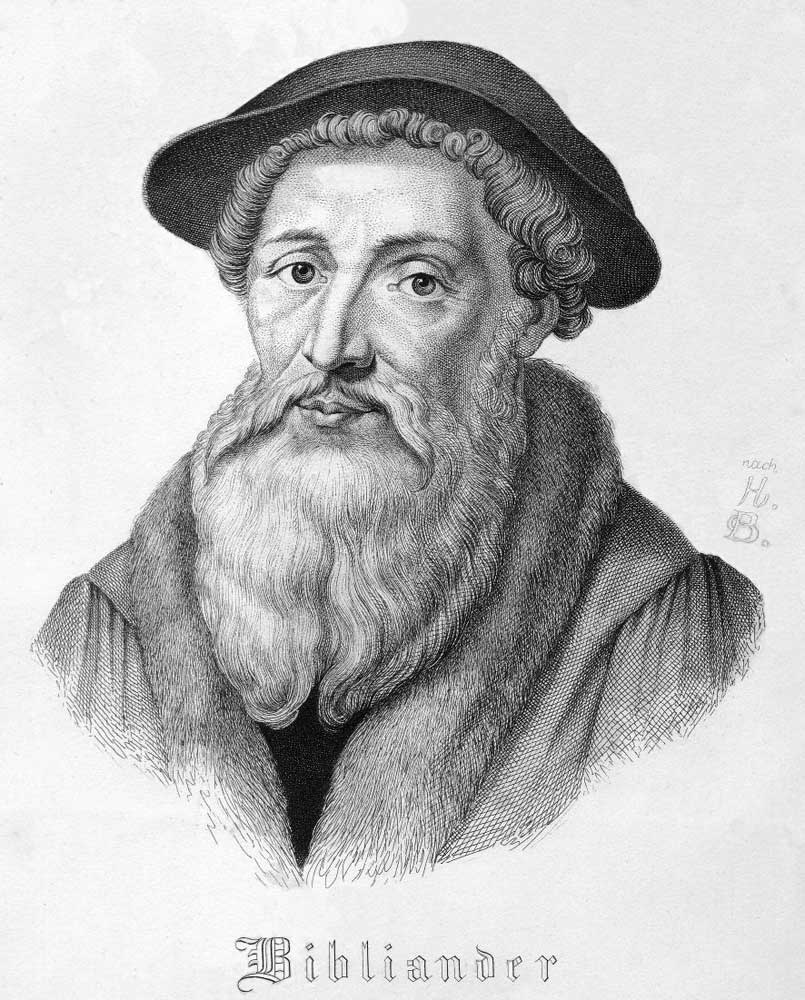
Theodore Bibliander

Theodore (or Theodorus) Bibliander (German: Theodor Buchmann; 1509 – 26 September 1564) was a Swiss orientalist, publisher, Protestant reformer and linguist.

== Biography ==
Born Theodor Buchmann (Bibliander is a Greek translation of this surname) in Bischofszell in 1509, he studied Latin under Oswald Myconius, and Greek and Hebrew under Jakob Ceporin, and attended lectures in Basel between 1525 and 1527 given by Johannes Oecolampadius and Konrad Pelikan. He also became familiar with the Arabic language and other languages from the East. He went on to became a professor of theology. He published a Hebrew grammar in 1535, and commentaries on the Bible.

Bibliander was an expert on Islam and published a book on the importance of preaching Christianity to Muslims. Johannes Oporinus printed Bibliander's edition of the Qur'an in Latin. (Basel, 1543), which was based on the medieval translation of Robert of Ketton. The edition included the entire Toledan Collection, including Doctrina Machumet, a translation of the Arabic theological tract known as the Book of One Thousand Questions.

Considered the father of biblical exegesis in Switzerland, Bibliander became involved in a doctrinal controversy with Pietro Martire Vermigli (Peter Martyr) over predestination. (Note: Frank A. James, III, writes that the axe duel story "does not seem to have a solid historical ground" citing Joachim Staedke.) He was removed from his theological professorship at the Carolinum academy in 1560.

Bibliander died of the plague in Zürich on 26 September 1564, at the age of 54–55.

== Works ==
His works include;

- Institutionum grammaticarum de lingua Hebraea liber unus, Zürich, 1535
- De optimo genere grammaticorum Hebraicorum, Hieronymus Curio, Zürich, 1542
- Machumetis Saracenorum principis eiusque successorum vitae ac doctrina ipseque Alcoran, Johannes Oporin, Basel, 1543, 1550. (Qur'an: on-line text with critical apparatus in French, on-line text with critical apparatus in German)
- Relatio fidelis, Johannes Oporin, Basel, 1545
- Zürich Bible (with Leo Juda)
- De ratione communi omnium linguarum et litterarum commentarius, Christoph Froschauer, Zürich, 1548
- De ratione temporum, Johannes Oporin, Basel, 1551
- De Fatis Monarchiae Romanae Somnium vaticinum Esdrae Prophetae, Basel, 1553
- Temporum a condito mundo usque ad ultimam ipsius aetatem supputatio, Johannses Oporin, Basel, 1558

== See also ==
- List of translations of the Quran

== Sources ==
- James, Frank A. III (1998). Peter Martyr Vermigli and Predestination: The Augustinian Inheritance of an Italian Reformer. Oxford: Clarendon Press. ISBN 978-0-19-826969-4.
- James, Frank A. III (2007). "The Bullinger/Vermigli Axis: Collaborators in Toleration and Reformation". In Campi, Emidio; Opitz, Peter (eds.). Heinrich Bullinger, Life — Thought — Influence. Vol. 1. Zurich: Theological Verlag. pp. 165–176. ISBN 978-3-290-17387-6.
- Steinmetz, David C. (2001). Reformers in the Wings: From Geiler Von Kaysersberg to Theodore Beza (2nd ed.). New York: Oxford University Press. ISBN 978-0-19-513047-8.
- Venema, Cornelius P. (2002). Heinrich Bullinger and the Doctrine of Predestination: Author of "the Other Reformed Tradition"?. Texts and Studies in Post-Reformation Thought. Grand Rapids, MI: Baker Academic. ISBN 978-0-8010-2605-8.
