= On Plants =

Exegesis by philosopher Nicolaus of Damascus

On Plants (Greek: Περὶ φυτῶν; Latin: De plantis) is a botanical treatise included in the Corpus Aristotelicum but usually regarded as Pseudo-Aristotle. In 1923, a manuscript containing the original Arabic translation from Greek, as completed by Ishaq ibn Hunayn, was identified in Istanbul, which led scholars to conclude the work was likely an exegesis/commentary by philosopher Nicolaus of Damascus (d. 4 AD) on a treatise by Aristotle which is now lost. On Plants describes the nature and origins of plants.

== Content ==
The work is divided into two parts.

=== Part 1 ===
The first part discusses the nature of plant life, sex in plants, the parts of plants, the structure of plants, the classification of plants, the composition and products of plants, the methods of propagation and fertilization of plants, and the changes and variations of plants.

=== Part 2 ===
The second part describes the origins of plant life, the material of plants, the effects of external conditions and climate on plants, water plants, rock plants, effects of locality on plants, parasitism, the production of fruits and leaves, the colors and shapes of plants, and fruits and their flavors.

=== Translations ===
Alfred the Englishman translated the Arabic version into Latin during the reign of King Henry III. It was translated from this version back into Greek during the Renaissance by a Greek resident in Italy.

== See also ==
- Historia plantarum (Theophrastus)
- Andrea Cesalpino (wrote De Plantis Libri XVI in 1583)
