= José Martínez Gázquez =

Spanish philologist

José Martínez Gázquez (born in María, Spain on August 19, 1943), is a Spanish philologist. He is Emeritus Professor of Latin Philology in the Autonomous University of Barcelona.

== Biography ==
Gázquez began to study Arts and Philosophy in the Diocesan Seminary of Almería. He studied the degree of Classical Philology in the University of Valencia and the University of Barcelona. In 1973 he got his Doctor title in the University of Barcelona, with a special award. He became part time professor in the University of Barcelona between 1970 and 1972. Later he became full time assistant professor in the Autonomous University of Barcelona between 1972 and 1988. He became Full Professor in the University of Murcia during the school year 1988–1989. Finally he was Professor of Latin Philology at the Autonomous University of Barcelona between 1989 and 2013. Since 2013 he is emeritus professor.

== Academy awards ==
- Doctor Honoris Causa by the University of Erlangen–Nuremberg, 2014.
- Member of the Reial Acadèmia de Bones Lletres de Barcelona, 2007.
- Associé correspondant étranger (a.c.é.) of the Société des Antiquaires de France
- Member of the International Medieval Latin Committee
- Member of the board of directors of the SISMEL (Società Internazionale per lo Studio del Medio Evo Latino, Firenze).
- Research Excellency Price (PREI). Arts Section of the Autonomous University of Barcelona 2008.

== Publications ==
Gázquez has published around 175 scientific works, books and articles in national and international reviews. His main research interests are the following ones:

History of Roman Spain:

- "La Campaña de Catón". In Hispania99, Barcelona 1974, (19922ª). (in Spanish)
- "Los dioses médicos y el culto a la salud en Herbarios romanos. Pseudo-Musa y Pseudo-Apuleyo", La cultura latina en la Cueva Negra. En agradecimiento y homenaje a los Prf. A. Stylow y M. Mayer. Antigüedad y Cristianismo. XIX 2002, pp. 67–75. (in Spanish)
- “Livio e Hispania”, Hispanité et Romanité. Jean Marie André (ed.). Madrid, 2004, pp. 177–187. (in Spanish)
- "La percepción del poder indígena en Hispania en Tito Livio", Pouvoir des hommes, pouvoir des mots, des Gracques à Trajan. Hommages au Prof. Paul M. Martin. Textes édités par O. DEVILLERS et J. MEYERS: Louvain. Paris, 2009, pp. 227–237. (in Spanish)

Study and edition of Latin translations of the Coran:

- “Trois traductions médiévales latines du Coran: Pierre le Venerable-Robert de Ketton, Marc de Tolède et Jean de Segobia”, Revue des Études Latines, 80, 2002, pp. 223–236. (in French)
- "El Prólogo de Juan de Segobia al Corán (Qur’an) trilingüe (1456)", Mittellateinisches Jahrbuch, 38, 2003, pp. 389–410. (in Spanish)
- “Translations of the Qur’an and Other Islamic Texts before Dante (Twelfth and Thirteenth Centuries)", Dante Studies, LCXXV 2007 79–92. (in English)

Study and edition of Arabian scientific texts translated into Latin:

- Las tablas de los movimientos de los cuerpos celestiales del Iluxtrisimo Rey don Alonso de Castilla seguidas de su Additio. (Traducción castellana anónima de los Cánones de Juan de Sajonia), Murcia, 1989. (in Spanish)
- Pedro Gallego, Opera omnia quae exstant. Summa de astronomía. (Apéndice J. Samsó), “La cultura astronómica de Pedro Gallego”) Liber de animalibus. De re oeconomica. SISMEL, Firenze, 2000. (in Spanish)
- "Auctor et Auctoritas en las traducciones del griego y el árabe al latin". In Auctor et Auctoritas in Latinis Medii Aeui Litteris Author and Authorship in Medieval Latin Literature. Proceedings of the VIth Congress of the International Medieval Latin Committee (Benevento-Naples, November 9–13, 2010). Edited by Edoardo D’Angelo and Jan Ziolkowski. SISMEL, Firenze, 2014 pp. 691–707. (in Spanish)
- "Titulus V of Petrus Alfonsi's Dialogus and Alfonso de Espina's Fortalitium fidei". In Petrus Alfonsi and his Dialogus. Background, Context, Reception. Edited by C. Cardelle and Ph. Roelli. SISMEL, Firenze, 2014. (in English)

Studies about mediaeval Hagiography:

- "Los estudios hagiográficos sobre el Medioevo en los últimos treinta años en Europa: España", Hagiographica Rivista di agiografia e biografia della SISMEL. “Gli studi agiografici sul Medioevo negli ultimi trenta anni in Europa” VI 1999, pp. 1–22. (in Spanish)
- “Las reliquias del Monasterio de Sant Cugat del Vallés en el siglo XIII y los abades Raimundus de Bagnariis y Petrus de Ameniis”, Societas amicorum. Mélanges offerts à F. Dolbeau pour son 65e anniversaire. Ëtudes réunies par J. Elfassi, C. Lanéry et A.M. Turcan-Verkerk. Firenze, 2012, pp. 460–471. (in Spanish)
