= Mark of Toledo =

Spanish physician (fl. 1193-1216)

Mark of Toledo (fl. 1193-1216) was a Spanish physician, translator and a canon of Toledo.

He is best known for producing one of the earliest translations of the Qur'an into Latin.

== Biography ==
Mark had studied medicine at university, and being fluent in Arabic, had translated several medical texts, including the Libellus de Unione Dei by Ibn Tumart, before being asked to translate the Qur’an.

The translation of the Qur’an was commissioned by the Archbishop of Toledo, Rodrigo Jiménez de Rada, and the city’s archdeacon, Master Maurice; it was completed in 1210.

Mark used a word-for-word translation technique, as opposed to Robert of Ketton’s earlier style.

He also translated Hippocrates' De aere aquis et locis, Hunayn Ibn Ishaq's versions of four of Galen's treatises.

== See also ==
- Toledo School of Translators
- Translations into Latin (c. 1050-c.1250)

== External sources ==
- http://faculty.washington.edu/petersen/alfonso/esctra12.htm
