= Pedro Álvarez de Toledo (disambiguation) =

Pedro Álvarez de Toledo may refer to:

- Pedro Álvarez de Toledo, 2nd Marquis of Villafranca (1484–1553), Spanish Viceroy of Naples
- Pedro Álvarez de Toledo, 5th Marquis of Villafranca (1546–1627)
- Pedro Álvarez de Toledo y Leiva (c. 1585–1654)
- Pedro de Alcántara Álvarez de Toledo y Silva, 12th Duke of the Infantado (1729–1790)
- Pedro de Alcántara Álvarez de Toledo, 13th Duke of the Infantado (1768–1841)
- Pedro de Alcántara Álvarez de Toledo, 17th Duke of Medina Sidonia (1803–1867)
