= Robert of Chester =

12th-century English scholar

Robert of Chester (Latin: Robertus Castrensis) was an English Arabist of the 12th century. He translated several historically important books from Arabic to Latin, such as:

- Book on the Composition of Alchemy (Liber de compositione alchemiae): translated in 1144, this was the first book on alchemy to become available in Europe
- Compendious Book on Calculation by Completion and Balancing (Liber algebrae et almucabola): al-Khwārizmī's book about algebra, translated in 1145

In the 1140s, Robert worked in Iberia, where the division of the region between Muslim and Christian rulers resulted in opportunities for interchange between the different cultures. However, by the end of the decade, he had returned to England. Some sources identify him with Robert of Ketton (Latin: Robertus Ketenensis), who was also active as an Arabic-Latin translator in the 1140s. However, Ketton and Chester, while both places in England, are a long way apart. Also, when in Iberia, Robert of Ketton was based in the Kingdom of Navarre, whereas Robert of Chester is known to have worked in Segovia.

== See also ==
- Latin translations of the 12th century
- Louis Charles Karpinski
