= Alfred of Sareshel =

12th-13th century English text translator

Alfred of Sarashel, also known as Alfred the Philosopher, Alfred the Englishman or Alfredus Anglicus, was born in England some time in the 12th century and died in the 13th century.

Not much more is known about his life apart from that he moved to Spain and worked in the Toledo School of Translators, where he translated several texts from Arabic and Greek into Latin.

== Works ==
- Translation of the pseudo-Aristotelian De plantis from the Arabic. "Alfred the Englishman translated the Arabic version into Latin in the reign of Henry III. It was retranslated from this version into Greek at the Renaissance by a Greek resident in Italy."
- Several commentaries on Aristotle, including four on his Meteors. These were extant down to the 17th century but have not survived.
- Wrote De motu cordis (On the Motion of the Heart) and dedicated it to Alexander Nequam.
- De naturis Rerum
- De Educatione Accipitrum (On the mode of training hawks)
- Five books on Boethius De consolatione philosophiae.
- De Musica
- De congelatione et conglutinatione lapidum (included in the Aristotel's Meteors) translation of ibn Sina text on mineralogy

== See also ==
- Latin translations of the 12th century
