= Hugo of Santalla =

Hugo of Santalla (also Hugh of Santalla, of Sanctalla, Hugo Sanctelliensis) was a significant translator of the first part of the twelfth century. From Arabic originals, he produced Latin translations of texts on alchemy, astronomy, astrology and geomancy.

He is thought to have been a Spanish priest, working in Tarazona. Michael, bishop of Tarazona was a patron.

Works attributed to him are translations of Alfraganus, Haly, the Liber de secretis naturae of Apollonius of Tyana, De Spatula on divination, and the Tabula Smaragdina. His Liber Aristotilis was an anthology of material with Greek and Persian origins, none of it now attributed to Aristotle.

== See also ==
- Latin translations of the 12th century
