= John of Seville =

12th-century Castilian scholar

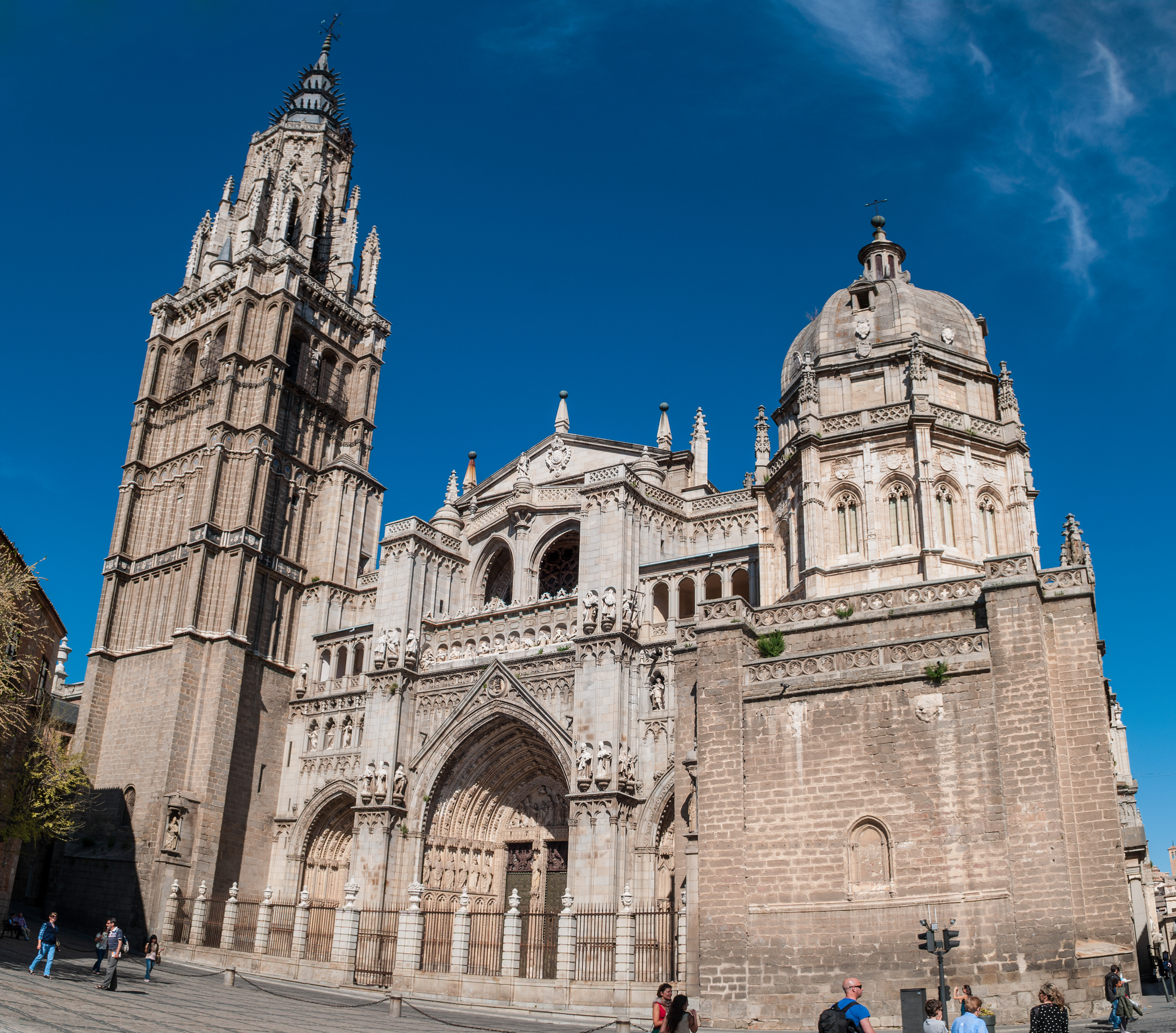
The Toledo School of Translators was originally located in a mosque that was apprehended by Alfonso VI in 1085. Translators made use of the numerous Arabic manuscripts kept here. Pictured is the Cathedral of Toledo, which would become the location of the school during the 13th century.

John of Seville (Latin: Johannes Hispalensis or Johannes Hispaniensis) (fl. 1133-53) was one of the main translators from Arabic into Castilian in partnership with Dominicus Gundissalinus during the early days of the Toledo School of Translators. John of Seville translated a litany of Arabic astrological works in addition to being credited with the production of several original works in Latin.

== Life and Context ==
John of Seville was a baptized Jew, whose Jewish name (now unknown) has been corrupted into "Avendeut", "Avendehut", "Avendar" or "Aven Daud". This evolved into the middle name "David", so that, as a native of Toledo, he is frequently referred to as Johannes (David) Toletanus. However, Avendehut's translations typically translated Arabic text into Spanish vernacular. John of Seville was capable of translating Arabic directly into Latin, creating a distinction between himself and Avendehut. Some historians argue that in fact there were two different persons with a similar name, one as Juan Hispano (Ibn Dawud) and other as Juan Hispalense, this last one perhaps working at Galician Limia (Ourense), for he signed himself as "Johannes Hispalensis atque Limiensis", during the Reconquista, the Christian campaign to regain the Iberian Peninsula. Though his precise birthdate and death date remain unknown, he is known to have flourished in his work from 1133 to 1153. His date of death is sometimes placed around 1157, but this remains an uncertainty.

== Translated and Original works ==
Since John of Seville had gone by multiple names throughout his lifetime, it is often debated by historians as to which translations of this time period were actually his. The topics of his translated works were mainly astrological, in addition to astronomical, philosophical and medical. John of Seville's particular style of translation is recognized by scholars due to his proclivity to translate works, word for word, while continuing to maintain the original language's syntax and grammatical structure.

=== Astrological and Astronomical ===
John of Seville translated Al-Farghani's Kitab Usul 'ilm al-nujum ("Book on the Elements of the Science of Astronomy") into Latin in 1135 ('era MCLXXIII') under the revised title of The Rudiments of Astronomy, as well as the Arab astrologer Albohali's "Book of Birth" into Latin in 1153. This also includes the work to translate another one of Al-Farghani’s works titled Kitāb fī Jawāmiʿ ʿIlm al-Nujūm ("Elements of astronomy on the celestial motions"). He also translated Kitāb taḥāwīl sinī al-‘ālam ("Flowers of Abu Ma'shar") by Abu Ma'shar al-Balkhi into Latin. More notable works of John of Seville include the translations of a manuscript in the library of St. Marks, the Greater Introduction of Albumasar, and the engraved written work of Thebit. Another astronomical work translated by John is De compositione et utilitate astrolabii ("The composition and utility of the astrolabe") which is an instructional book explaining the construction and utilization of astrolabes. The introduction of an effective method of marking alidades, an integral component of astrolabes, was introduced through one of John's translations titled Dixit Johannes: Cum volueris facere astrolabium accipe auricalcum optimum. The work itself is originally attributed to the Arabic astronomer Mash’allah. Another significant work translated by John of Seville was Omar’s (Umar Ibn al-Farrukhân al-Tabarî) work Kitâb al-Mawâlid ("The Book of Nativities"), under the Latin title “De Nativitatibus.” Kitâb al-Mawâlid is an astrological treatise concerning “the interpretation of nativities, or birth horoscopes”. It has three separate books with quotes from other authors, including Ptolemy, Messahallah and Hermes. Another work that is attributed to John of Seville through a note in the beginning of one of the margins is from Astroligi(c)e speculationis exercitium habere volentibus, which is now at Pommersfelden, near Bamberg in Germany.

=== Medical and Alchemy ===
At least three of his translations, a short version of the Secretum Secretorum dedicated to a Queen Tarasia, a tract on gout offered to one of the Popes Gregory, and the original version of the 9th century Arabic philosopher Qusta ibn Luqa's De differentia spiritus et animae (The Difference Between the Spirit and the Soul), were medical translations intermixed with alchemy in the Hispano-Arabic tradition. His partial translation of the Secretum Secretorum is considered to be his earliest known work. Unlike much of his later work, this translation utilizes a first-person perspective. A lesser-known translation of his titled Speculum Elementorum, also referred to as Tractatus de perfecta et infallibili Medicina arte Akimie, was originally written by an unknown author. Another notable work translated by John of Seville from arabic is the Emerald Tablet, an alchemical work of the Hermetic tradition that is originally credited to Hermes Trismegistus himself, it was said to contain many alchemical secrets.

=== Philosophical ===
In his Book of Algorithms on Practical Arithmetic, John of Seville provides one of the earliest known descriptions of Indian positional notation, whose introduction to Europe is usually associated with the book Liber Abaci by Fibonacci:

“A number is a collection of units, and because the collection is infinite (for multiplication can continue indefinitely), the Indians ingeniously enclosed this infinite multiplicity within certain rules and limits so that infinity could be scientifically defined; these strict rules enabled them to pin down this subtle concept.”

John of Seville is also credited with working in collaboration with Dominicus Gundissalinus and Jewish philosopher Abraham Ibn Daud to translate the De anima of Avicenna, a philosophical commentary on Aristotle's writings. Avicenna had many other of his works translated such as a philosophical encyclopedia titled Kitab al-Shifa’ (The Book of Healing) and a short script on metaphysics titled Liber de Causis (Book of Causes). John even retranslated an original Avicenna translation of Aristotle’s On the Heavens. It is speculated that the written work of Zael, titled Liber temporum, may have been translated by John of Seville. However, the name of the translator was never mentioned in the manuscript so it remains uncertain. A work by Jewish philosopher Avencebrol is believed to be translated by both John of Seville and Dominicus Gundissalinus titled Fons Vitae (Source of Life). Another one of John of Seville's philosophical translation includes the work by philosopher Al-Ghazali titled Maqasid al-falasifa (The Aims of the Philosophers), a book regarding basic philosophical concepts such as judgement, concept and logic.

=== Original ===
In addition to his many translations John of Seville is credited with a work of his own titled, Epitome artis astrologiae, written in 1142 which is a summary of astrology as a whole.

== Copying Errors ==
The work of John of Seville was later preserved by medieval scholars through the copying of his translations. These copies occasionally deviate from John's original text, producing errors that further perpetuate the issue of John's identity. When the name of a translator was improperly copied into a manuscript, further copies of this manuscript would carry this error, initiating a mutation of names and dates over the span of multiple copies. Carelessness further complicated the matter. Abbreviations such as "Ioh Hisp" (Iohannes Hispalensis was yet another possible identity for John) were used, such as in a manuscript from 1503.

Fortunately, a number of factors have aided in determining whether certain translations belong to John of Seville. He would often sign his translations "Cum laude Dei et eius adiutorio," making otherwise error-ridden manuscripts easily attributable to John.

== See also ==
- New Christian: converso & marrano
- Toledo School of Translators
- Latin translations of the 12th century
