= Gerland (mathematician) =

Medieval English mathematician

Gerland was an 11th-century mathematician who flourished in England following the Norman Conquest. Little is known of his personal life. His treatise on the Computus may be found in the British Museum and his work on the abacus is preserved in the Bibliothèque nationale de France in Paris.
