= Robertus Anglicus =

Robertus Anglicus or Robert the Englishman was an English astronomer of the thirteenth century. He taught at the University of Montpellier, and possibly also at Paris. He is known as the author of a 1271 commentary on the De Sphera Mundi of Johannes de Sacrobosco. It includes a significant reference to the state of the art in the technology of clockwork.

He is also the author of the paper (or parchment) "Astrolabii Canones", which provided important principles for measurement on spheres.
