= James Kritzeck =

James Kritzeck (born July 6, 1930, St. Cloud, Minnesota) is an Islamic studies scholar who specialises in Islamic literature and its translation.

He was educated at Saint John's Abbey (1945-47), the University of Minnesota (BA, 1949), Princeton University (MA, 1952), and Harvard University (PhD, 1954); he was elected to the Society of Fellows at Harvard University in 1952. As well as travelling through much of the Islamic world in order to increase his knowledge of Islamic works, Kritzeck studied Islam through reading and teaching, with (among others) Henry Corbin, Louis Massignon and Herbert Mason. He edited Anthology of Islamic Literature, a collection of Islamic writings from the Qur'an up until the 18th century. Ironically a sceptic of translation, Kritzeck strove to include only the finest and most accurate interpretations of poetry and prose.

Kritzeck has been Professor of Oriental Studies at Princeton, and a member of the Center of Theological Inquiry at Princeton Theological Seminary. A special collection in his honor has been established at the Hill Museum & Manuscript Library at Saint John's University in Collegeville, Minnesota.

== Major publications ==
- Anthology of Islamic Literature: From the Rise of Islam to Modern Times by James Kritzeck, ISBN 0-452-00879-4
- Islam in Africa by James Kritzeck and William Hubert Lewis ISBN 0-442-04502-6
- Modern Islamic Literature:from 1800 to the Present by James Kritzeck, Holt, Rinehart and Winston
- Sons of Abraham: Jews, Christians and Moslems, by James Kritzeck. Baltimore: Helicon, 1965 ISBN 0-03-053685-5
- Peter the Venerable and Islam. James Kritzeck, Princeton University Press, 1964
- The World of Islam: Studies in Honour of Philip K. Hitti, ed. by Philip Khuri Hitti and James Kritzeck and R. Bayly Winder, Ayer Co Pub, ISBN 0-8369-9265-2
