= Robert of Ketton =

12th-century English translator and priest

Robert of Ketton, known in Latin as Rodbertus Ketenensis (fl. 1141–1157), was an English astronomer, translator, priest and diplomat active in Spain. He translated several works of Arabic into Latin, including the first translation of the Quran into any Western language. Between 1144 and 1157 he held an archdeaconry in the diocese of Pamplona. In the past he has been confounded with Robert of Chester (Latin Robertus Castrensis), another English translator active in Spain in the mid-twelfth century; and at least one modern scholar believes they are the same person.

Robert's byname, Ketenensis or on one occasion de Ketene, is usually taken to refer to Ketton, a village in Rutland, a few miles from Stamford, Lincolnshire. It was probably Robert's birthplace. This nickname was never used in official documents associated with Pamplona, where he was always simply "Master Robert" (magister Rodbertus), indicating that he had a master of arts degree. The identification of the translator known as Robert of Ketton and the archdeacon known as Master Robert is provided by a letter of Peter the Venerable, abbot of Cluny in the spring or summer of 1144, when Peter sent some of Robert's translations to Bernard of Clairvaux. In the accompanying letter he named the translator as "Robert of Ketton from England, who is now archdeacon of the church of Pamplona" (Roberto Ketenensi de Anglia, qui nunc Pampilonensis ecclesiae archidiaconus est).

== Early life ==
In 1134, he left France and travelled east for four years with Hermann of Carinthia, visiting Italy, Dalmatia, Greece and Asia, where he learned the Arabian language. He then worked on translations of astronomy and religion.

== Translations ==
Prior to 1141, Robert and Hermann of Carinthia were engaged in a project of translating Arabic texts into Latin for their own use and education. Richard Hakluyt surmised that the two men had travelled in Arabic-speaking countries. Only one product of Robert from this early collaboration is known or has survived. On Hermann's request, Robert translated al-Kindi's Astrological Judgements, under the Latin title Judicia. (Many later manuscripts misattribute it to the astronomer Robertus Anglicus.) In the preface to this translation, he explains that his interest is in geometry and astronomy, but that he is undertaking an astrological work for the sake of his friendship with Hermann. Their real plan, he says, is to work through Euclid's Elements and Theodosius's Spherics in order to be capable of understanding Ptolemy's Almagest. All of these texts would have been available to them only in Arabic at that time. Robert also translated works written by Al Battani and Avicenna.

It has been suggested that one other text that survives might be Robert's work from his and Hermann's private collaboration: a translation of Euclid's Elements known as "Adelard II", which is usually attributed to Adelard of Bath and sometimes to Robert of Chester. It was the most popular of several Latin translations of Euclid from the twelfth century. In his translation of Ptolemy's Planisphere of 1143, Hermann also mentions that Robert gave him the astronomical tables of al-Battani, perhaps in translation.

In 1141, Robert and Hermann met Abbot Peter the Venerable on the banks of the Ebro, probably at Logroño, and he convinced them to translate some Islamic texts for his collection, which has become known as the Toledan Collection. For this project, Robert translated a history of the early Caliphate under the title Chronica mendosa Saracenorum (Lying Chronicle of the Saracens) and the Quran itself under the title Lex Mahumet pseudoprophete (Law of the False Prophet Muhammad). For the latter work he was assisted by a certain Muhammad. His translation is very free and he does not subdivide the text according to the suras. This is in contrast with Mark of Toledo’s word-for-word translation 70 years later. The entire Toledan Collection was printed by the Protestant writer Theodore Bibliander at Basel in 1543.

As late as 1143, Robert still had in mind his and Hermann's pet project of astronomical translations, for he wrote a letter to Peter the Venerable promising "a celestial gift which embraces within itself the whole of science … revealing most accurately, according to number, proportion and measure, all the celestial circles and their quantities, orders and conditions, and, finally, all the various movements of the stars, and their effects and natures."

== Ecclesiastical career ==
Robert's career in the church began after his career as a translator had ended. (Perhaps he received his benefice as a reward for his work.) He was an archdeacon at Pamplona from at least 1144 - and probably shortly before that - until 1157, when he was transferred to a canonry of Tudela. His presence at Pamplona is known from documents of 1145, 1147, 1149 and 1151. He was in Barcelona on official business in 1152. He seems to have held the archdeaconry of Valdonsella, which included the town of Uncastillo. Since the Kingdom of Navarre regained its independence in 1134, this lay on the border with and was disputed by the Kingdom of Aragon. Robert served King García Ramírez of Navarre (whose grandfather, Sancho Garcés, was lord of Uncastillo) as a diplomat, even drawing up the peace treaty signed with Raymond Berengar IV, regent of Aragon, on 1 July 1149. For this effort on behalf of peace, he was commended by Pope Eugenius III.

In 1151, Robert's bishop, Lope de Artajona, sent him as his delegate to a conference to resolve the disputed boundary between the dioceses of Pamplona and Zaragoza. Later, Robert led some of the Pamplonese clergy into rebellion against Lope. Their dispute was for a time patched up, but when Lope came into conflict with King Sancho VI, Robert joined the king's side. It was probably through the king that he obtained the canonry in Tudela after his archdeaconry had become untenable. There is no record of him after 1157. Charles Burnett notes that "Robert's education fit him well for the roles of diplomat, royal adviser and redactor of official documents."

== See also ==
- Latin translations of the 12th century
