= Lex Mahumet pseudoprophete =

Latin translation of the Quran by Robert of Ketton

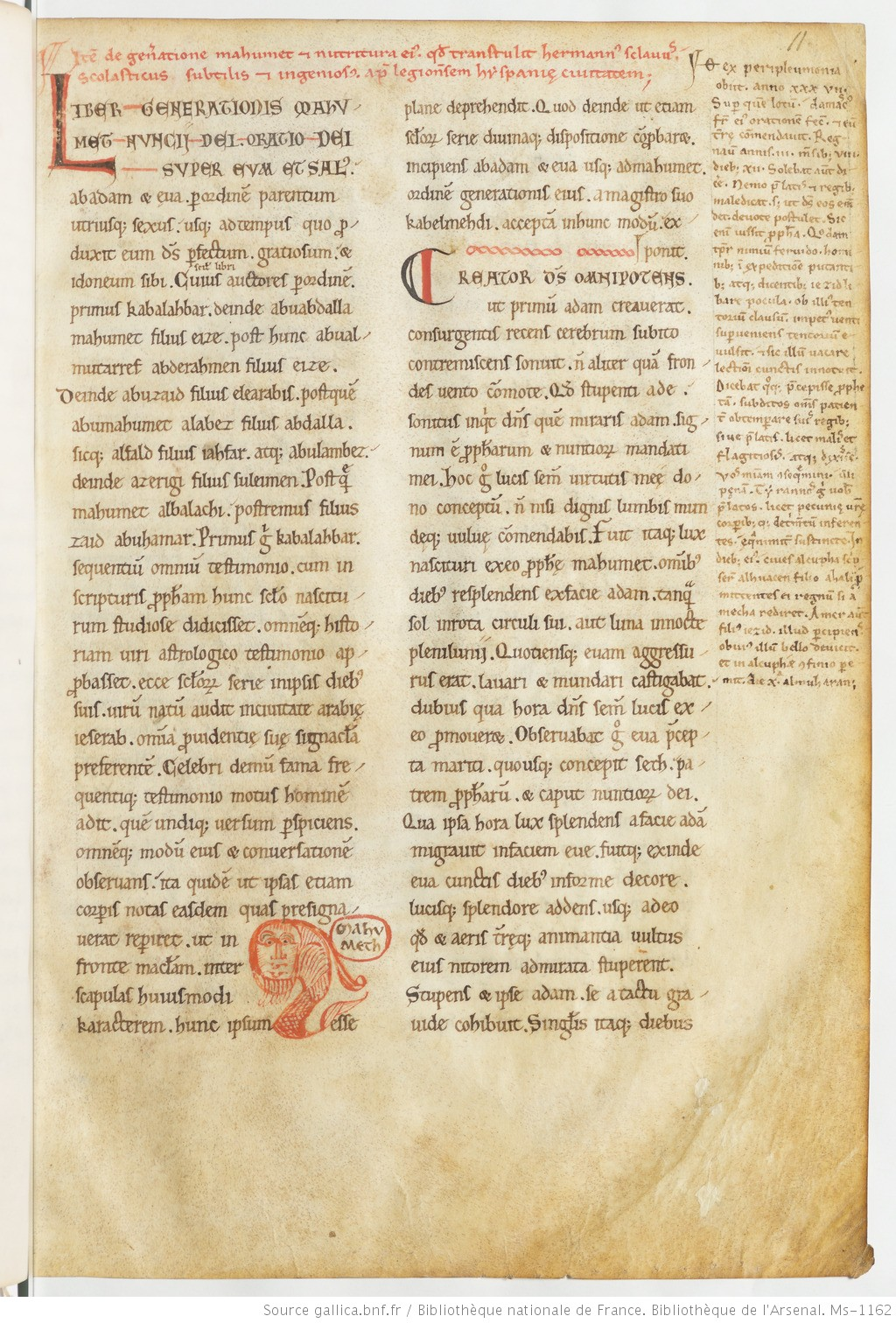
Manuscript of Lex Mahumet pseudoprophete

Lex Mahumet pseudoprophete (English: Law of Muhammad the pseudo-prophet) is a controversial translation of the Qur'an into Medieval Latin by Robert of Ketton (c. 1110 – 1160 AD). It is the earliest translation of the Qur'an into a Western European language, completed in 1142-1143.

In 1142 French abbot Peter the Venerable persuaded Robert to join a group he was creating to translate Arabic works into Latin in hopes of aiding the religious conversion of Muslims to Christianity. The translation of the Qur'an was the principal work of this collection, the Corpus Cluniacense. The undertaking was huge, taking over a year and filling over 100 folios (180 pages in modern print). This translation of the Qur'an became popular, with over 25 manuscripts still existing, together with two 16th-century prints. It was the standard translation for Europeans from its release until the 18th century.

== Criticism ==
Despite its success and early influence, much scholarly consensus deems the text unreliable. Thomas E. Burman states, "from the 15th century to the present, scholarly opinion has condemned it as a loose, misleading paraphrase". Juan de Segovia, a 15th-century translator of the Qur'an, criticised the translation for the liberties Robert of Ketton took with it. The traditional 114 suras had been expanded into more, and Juan de Segovia claimed that the explicit from the Arabic was often left out while the implicit was included, not to mention numerous order changes. The Italian Ludovico Marracci, Dutch Hadrian Reland, and British George Sale all criticized the translation with Sale even stating that it "deserve[d] not the name of a translation". Nevertheless, the text was widely used as the first comprehensive translation of the Qur'an into Latin.

== Muslim–Christian relations ==
Peter the Venerable's explicit purpose for commissioning the translation was the conversion of Muslims. His group included a Muslim, but the book needs to be seen in the context of Catholics translating the works of an opposing or competing religion (see also the translation by Mark of Toledo).

== Sample texts ==
The translation's opening and the Sura Al Fatiha:

INCIPIT LEX SARACENORUM, QUAM ALCORAN VOCANT, ID EST, collectionem praeceptorum.

AZOARA PRIMA

Misericordi pioque Deo, universitatis creatori, iudicium cuius postremo die expectat(ur), voto simplici nos humiliemus, adorantes ipsum sueque manus suffragium semiteque donum et dogma qua suos ad se benivolos nequaquam hostes et erroneos adduxit, iugiter sentiamus.

Sura Al-Baqara ayah 28 in comparative translation:

How can ye reject the faith in Allah?- seeing that ye were without life, and He gave you life; then will He cause you to die, and will again bring you to life; and again to Him will ye return.

— Modern English translation by Yusuf Ali

Hic namque uos ad uitam de non esse deducens mortem inducet et ad se uos resurgere faciet

— Robert of Ketton's Lex Mahumet pseudoprophete
Translation:

For he, drawing you out of nonbeing into life, will bring on death, and will make you rise up to him.

Qualiter blasphematis in Deum? Et eratis mortui, [et] uiuificauit uos; deinde mortificabit uos; deinde uiuificabit; demum ad eum redibitis.

— Mark of Toledo's translation
Translation:

How can you disbelieve in God? For when you were dead, he gave you life, and then he will cause you to die, and then he will give you life, and then to him you will be returned.

This example shows the tendency of Robert of Ketton's translation to rework the original structure of the Qur'an compared to the very literal interpretation of his contemporary Mark of Toledo. Both of these can be compared to the widely accepted modern translation in order to show the differences between modern and medieval translation practices. With Burman's translation of a translation, some meaning of the original text may be lost.

== See also ==
- Flügel edition
- Hinckelmann edition
- Marracci edition
- List of translations of the Qur'an
- Medieval Christian views on Muhammad
