= Peter the Venerable =

French abbot and saint (c. 1092 – 25 December 1156)

Blessed Peter the Venerable
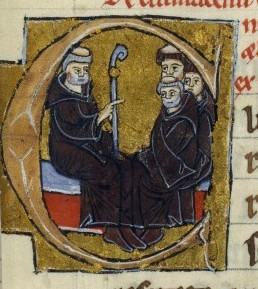
- Peter the Venerable, with other monks, 13th century illuminated manuscript

Benedictine Monk, Abbot of Cluny
- Born: c. 1092; France
- Died: 25 December 1156; Cluny Abbey, France
- Venerated in: Catholic Church, Folk Catholicism
- Feast: 29 December

Peter the Venerable (c. 1092 – 25 December 1156), also known as Peter of Montboissier, was the abbot of the Benedictine abbey of Cluny. He has been honored as a saint although he was never canonized in the Middle Ages. Since in 1862 Pope Pius IX confirmed his historical cult, and the Martyrologium Romanum, issued by the Holy See in 2004, regards him as a blessed.

== Life ==
Born to Blessed Raingarde in Auvergne, Peter was "dedicated to God" at birth and given to the monastery at Sauxillanges of the Congregation of Cluny where he took his vows at age seventeen. By the age of twenty he gained a professorship and was appointed prior of the monastery of Vézelay, transferring later to the monastery at Domène. Success at Vézelay and Domène led to his election as abbot general of the order, aged thirty. After his predecessor, the abbot Pontius, had been deposed by the pope, Peter became a tireless reformer of the Cluniac order, in the face of criticism from other orders and prominent monks and theologians, including the Cistercian monk St. Bernard of Clairvaux. His defence of his order against critics and his introduction of radical reforms, earned him the appellation of "venerable".

Peter, as an associate of national and religious leaders, attended many of the international religious councils. At the Council of Pisa in 1134 he supported the cause of Pope Innocent II, and the Council of Reims in 1147 and helped avert a Church schism. He defended the rationalistic Trinitarianism of the French theologian Peter Abelard against the sentence of the Council of Sens, granting Abelard hospitality at Cluny and working towards the eventual reconciliation of Abelard and his principal accuser, Bernard of Clairvaux. Peter granted Abelard a posthumous absolution at the request of Heloise.

Peter collected sources on, and writings about, Islam (see below) and spent a long sabbatical in Spain with Islamic scholars of all ranks. His vast correspondence reflects an almost encyclopedic theological knowledge. He produced some of the most important documents of the 12th century, and published the first Latin translation of the Qu'ran which became the standard Benedictine text used by preachers of the Crusades. His Talmudic contributions are tenuous and still under scrutiny. His friendship and correspondence with Bishop Henry of Blois of Winchester and Glastonbury, between 1138 and 1142, together with his debating skills, brought wider recognition of his scholarship. The internecine truce between Peter and Bernard of Clairvaux must be seen as superficial in light of recent scholarship detailing the repressiveness of Bernard's Cistercians toward the Cluniac orders.

He also wrote a number of musical compositions for use in Cluny.

Peter the Venerable died at Cluny on 25 December 1156. His works are edited in Patrologia Latina vol. 189.

== Contribution to Muslim–Christian relations ==
Despite his active life and important role in European history, Peter's greatest achievement is his contribution to the reappraisal of the Church's relations with the religion of Islam. A proponent of studying Islam based upon its own sources, he commissioned a comprehensive translation of Islamic source material, and in 1142 he traveled to Spain where he met his translators. One scholar has described this as a "momentous event in the intellectual history of Europe."

The Arabic manuscripts which Peter had translated may have been obtained in Toledo, which was an important centre for translation from the Arabic. However, Peter appears to have met his team of translators further north, possibly in La Rioja, where he is known to have visited the Cluniac monastery of Santa María la Real of Nájera. The project translated a number of texts relating to Islam (known collectively as the "corpus toletanum"). They include the Apology of al-Kindi; and most importantly the first-ever translation into Latin of the Arabic Qur'an (the "Lex Mahumet pseudoprophete") for which Robert of Ketton was the main translator. Peter of Toledo is credited for planning and annotating the collection, and Peter of Poitiers (Peter the Venerable's secretary) helped to polish the final Latin version. The team also included Robert of Ketton's friend Herman of Carinthia and a Muslim called Mohammed. The translation was completed in either June or July 1143, in what has been described as "a landmark in Islamic Studies. With this translation, the West had for the first time an instrument for the serious study of Islam." George Sale criticized the translation for containing "numberless faults" and "leaving scarce any resemblance" of the Quran.

Peter used the newly translated material in his own writings on Islam, of which the most important are the Summa totius heresis Saracenorum (The Summary of the Entire Heresy of the Saracens) and the Liber contra sectam sive heresim Saracenorum (The Refutation of the Sect or Heresy of the Saracens). In these works Peter portrays Islam as a Christian heresy that approaches paganism, as Irven Resnick aptly puts it:

Peter fails to recognize Islam as a religion of independent origin; rather, he imagines that Muslims subscribe to a Christian heresy "because they believe some things with us," and because they learned these beliefs from heretical Christians like Sergius; possibly, he concedes, one should call them pagans (pagani) or heathens (ethnici), however, because they do not share any of the Christian sacraments, as other heretics do. But insofar as he regards Muslims as heretics, he places them in a different category both from Jews and from pagans. In his polemic Against the Petrobrusians, which Peter brought to its final form in 1143 soon after his return from Spain, he remarked that "in our day there exist chiefly four different types of sects in the world, i.e., Christians, Jews, Saracens, and pagans . . ." (Contra Petrobrusianos haereticos 161, p. 94). Both Jews and Muslims, however, will be subject to certain legal disabilities—e.g., a prohibition against marriage to or even sexual relations with a Christian.

While his interpretation of Islam was basically negative, it did manage in "setting out a more reasoned approach to Islam…through using its own sources rather than those produced by the hyperactive imagination of some earlier Western Christian writers." Although this alternative approach was not widely accepted or emulated by other Christian scholars of the Middle Ages, it did achieve some influence among a limited number of Church figures, including Roger Bacon.

At his weekly general audience in Saint Peter's Square on 14 October 2009, Pope Benedict XVI used Peter as an example of compassion and understanding, citing Peter's governance of Cluny, diplomacy, and study of Islam.

== See also ==
- Qur'an translations

== Notes and references ==
Catholic Church titles
Preceded by Hugh II	Abbot of Cluny; 1122-1156	Succeeded by Hugh III
