= Liber de compositione alchemiae =

12th-century translation of an Arabic alchemical work

The Liber de compositione alchemiae ("Book on the Composition of Alchemy"), also known as the Testamentum Morieni ("Testament of Morienus"), the Morienus, or by its Arabic title Masāʾil Khālid li-Maryānus al-rāhib ("Khalid's Questions to the Monk Maryanos"), is a work on alchemy falsely attributed to the Umayyad prince Khalid ibn Yazid (c. 668 – c. 704). It is generally considered to be the first Latin translation of an Arabic work on alchemy into Latin, completed on 11 February 1144 by the English Arabist Robert of Chester. (Note: There is some doubt about whether the attribution of the preface of the work to Robert of Chester is authentic, but the dating of the translation does not depend on this (see Dapsens 2016, p. 133 and Moureau 2020, p. 116, both referring to Lemay 1990–1991 and Kahn 1990–1991).)

The work takes the form of a dialogue between Khalid ibn Yazid and his purported alchemical master, the Byzantine monk Morienus (Arabic مريانس, Maryānus, perhaps from Greek Μαριανός, Marianos), himself supposedly a pupil of the philosopher Stephanus of Alexandria (fl. early seventh century). Widely popular among later alchemists, the work is extant in many manuscripts and has been printed and translated into vernacular languages several times since the sixteenth century.

== Arabic text ==
The Latin translation is for the most part based on an Arabic source, (Note: The Arabic text (partial edition and translation into English by Al-Hassan 2004, full critical edition and translation into French by Dapsens 2021) goes by different names. Moureau 2020, p. 116 and Al-Hassan 2004 still refer to the text as Risālat Maryānus al-rāhib al-ḥakīm li-l-amīr Khālid ibn Yazīd ("The Epistle of the Wise Monk Maryanos to the Prince Khalid ibn Yazid"), but Dapsens 2021 has chosen the name Masāʾil Khālid li-Maryānus al-rāhib ("Khalid's Questions to the Monk Maryanos") for her critically established text. Manuscripts of the Arabic text are listed by Dapsens 2016, pp. 124–126. The Arabic source was for a long time thought to be lost (still so in Halleux 1996, p. 889). As a result, the very existence of such an Arabic source was sometimes put into doubt (see Ruska 1924, pp. 47–48; cf. Dapsens 2016, p. 123).) though both the Arabic Masāʾil Khālid li-Maryānus al-rāhib and the Latin Liber de compositione alchemiae contain sections not present in the other. The Arabic text belongs to the alchemical works associated with Khalid ibn Yazid, which are widely regarded as ninth- or tenth-century forgeries, although it has also been argued that some of them may go back to the eighth century. Since one manuscript of the Masāʾil Khālid li-Maryānus al-rāhib contains a citation from the early tenth-century work Muṣḥaf al-ḥayāt ("Book of Life") attributed to Ibn Umayl (c. 900 – c. 960), the work may have been originally written in the latter half of the tenth century.

== Latin text ==
The word alchemia in the Latin title does not yet refer to the art of alchemy, but rather to the mysterious material which alchemists claimed could transmute one substance into another (i.e., the elixir or philosophers' stone). (Note: On the various definitions of alchemy in medieval Arabic and Latin sources, whose common characteristic is the transmutation of something imperfect into something better, see further Moureau 2020, pp. 91–101.) The actual meaning of the Latin title is thus "the book on the composition of the elixir". (Note: As has been noted by Ruska 1924, p. 36 (cf. Dapsens 2016, p. 133), the Latin word alchemia occurs a few times in the Latin translator's preface and at the very end of the text (which is also exclusive to the Latin text, see Dapsens 2016, pp. 126–127), but in the central parts of the Latin text it occurs only once (also in the meaning of elixir, see Moureau 2020, p. 90, note 16).) As the Latin translator states in his preface:

This book styles itself the composition of alchemy. And as your Latin world does not yet know what alchemy is and what its composition is, I will clarify it in the present text. [...] The philosopher Hermes and his successors defined this word as follows, for instance in the book of the mutation of substances: alchemy is a material substance taken from one and composed by one, joining between them the most precious substances by affinity and effect, and by the same natural mixture, naturally transforming them into better substances.

The author of the Latin preface appears to have had access to other translated sources, among them texts attributed to Hermes Trismegistus (Hermetica). The emphasis on the alchemical elixir being "taken from one and composed by one" (Latin: ex uno et per unum composita) may be a reference to the short and cryptic Hermetic text known as the Emerald Tablet, which mentions that "the performance of wonders stems from one, just as all things stem from one substance according to a single procedure". (Note: Rosenthal's translation is taken from pseudo-Apollonius of Tyana's Sirr al-khalīqa wa-ṣanʿat al-ṭabīʿa (c. 750–850), likely the earliest source of the Emerald Tablet. The original Arabic reads ʿamal al-ajāʾib min wāḥid kamā kānat al-ashyāʾ kulluhā min wāḥid bi-tadbīr wāḥid (Weisser 1979, p. 524). The Latin translation of the Arabic by Hugo of Santalla reads prodigiorum operatio ex uno, quemadmodum omnia ex uno eodemque ducunt originem, una eademque consilii administratione (Hudry 1997–1999, p. 152).)

== Bibliography ==
=== Primary sources ===
- Al-Hassan, Ahmad Y. (2004). "The Arabic Original of the Liber de compositione alchemiae: The Epistle of Maryānus, the Hermit and Philosopher, to Prince Khālid ibn Yazīd". Arabic Sciences and Philosophy. 14 (2): 213–231. doi:10.1017/S0957423904000086. (same content also available online) (partial edition of the Arabic text with English translation)
- Dapsens, Marion (2021). «Arabice appellatur Elixir» : les Masā’il Khālid li-Maryānus al-rāhib dans leurs versions arabe et latine (PhD dissertation). Université catholique de Louvain. hdl:2078.1/252488. (edition and French translation of the Arabic text; edition and French translation of two versions of the Latin text; study and commentary)
- Manget, Jean-Jacques (1702). Bibliotheca Chemica Curiosa. 2 vols. Geneva. Vol. 1, pp. 509–519. (edition of the Latin text)
- Stavenhagen, Lee (1974). A Testament of Alchemy. Being the Revelations of Morienus to Khālid ibn Yazīd. Hanover: Brandeis University Press. ISBN 9780874510959. OCLC 01055311. (edition of the Latin text with English translation)

=== Secondary sources ===
- Bacchi, Eleonora; Martelli, Matteo (2009). "Il Principe Halid b. Yazid e le origini dell'alchimia araba". In Cevenini, Daniele; D'Onofrio, Svevo (eds.). Conflitti e Dissensi Nell'Islam. Bologna: Il Ponte Editrice. pp. 85–119. ISBN 9788889465332. (contains a systematic comparison of the Arabic and the Latin text)
- Carlotta, Vincenzo (2017). "La morte e la resurrezione dei corpi nel Dialogo dei filosofi e di Cleopatra e nel Liber de compositione alchemiae di Morieno". In Fidora, Alexander; Polloni, Nicola (eds.). Appropriation, Interpretation and Criticism: Philosophical and Theological Exchanges Between the Arabic, Hebrew and Latin Intellectual Traditions. Textes et Etudes du Moyen Âge. Vol. 88. Barcelona and Rome: Fédération Internationale des Instituts d’Études Médiévales. pp. 93–120. ISBN 978-2-503-57744-9.
- Dapsens, Marion (2016). "De la Risālat Maryānus au De Compositione alchemiae: Quelques réflexions sur la tradition d'un traité d'alchimie" (PDF). Studia graeco-arabica. 6: 121–140.
- Dolgusheva, Svetlana (2012). Zwei arabische Dialoge über Alchemie. Das Kitāb Mihrārīs al-ḥakīm und die Masāʾil Ḫālid li-Maryānus ar-rāhib (MA thesis). Freie Universität Berlin.
- Forster, Regula (2016). "The Transmission of Secret Knowledge: Three Arabic Dialogues on Alchemy". Al-Qantara. 37 (2): 399–422. doi:10.3989/alqantara.2016.013. (literary analysis of the Masāʾil Khālid li-Maryānus al-rāhib and two other Arabic alchemical dialogues)
- Forster, Regula (2017). Wissensvermittlung im Gespräch: Eine Studie zu klassisch-arabischen Dialogen. Islamic History and Civilization. Vol. 149. Leiden and Boston: Brill. doi:10.1163/9789004326729. ISBN 978-90-04-32670-5. (see index p. 521, s.v. Masāʾil Ḫālid li-Maryānus ar-rāhib; bibliography and summary content on pp. 461–462)
- Forster, Regula (2021). "Khālid b. Yazīd". In Fleet, Kate; Krämer, Gudrun; Matringe, Denis; Nawas, John; Rowson, Everett (eds.). Encyclopaedia of Islam, Three. doi:10.1163/1573-3912_ei3_COM_35436.
- Halleux, Robert (1996). "The Reception of Arabic Alchemy in the West". In Rashed, Roshdi (ed.). Encyclopedia of the History of Arabic Science. Vol. 3. London: Routledge. pp. 886–902. ISBN 9780415020633.
- Hudry, Françoise (1997–1999). "Le De secretis nature du Ps. Apollonius de Tyane, traduction latine par Hugues de Santalla du Kitæb sirr al-halîqa". Chrysopoeia. 6: 1–154. ISBN 9788872522073.
- Kahn, Didier (1990–1991). "Note sur deux manuscrits du Prologue attribué à Robert de Chester". Chrysopoeia. 4: 33–34. ISBN 9788872522004.
- Lemay, R. (1990–1991). "L'authenticité de la préface de Robert de Chester à sa traduction du Morienus". Chrysopoeia. 4: 3–32. ISBN 9788872522004.
- Lory, Pierre (1989). Alchimie et mystique en terre d'Islam. Lagrasse: Verdier. ISBN 9782864320913.
- Moureau, Sébastien (2020). "Min al-kīmiyāʾ ad alchimiam. The Transmission of Alchemy from the Arab-Muslim World to the Latin West in the Middle Ages". Micrologus. 28: 87–141. hdl:2078.1/211340. (survey of all Latin alchemical texts known to have been translated from the Arabic)
- Rosenthal, Franz (1975) [1965]. The Classical Heritage in Islam. Translated by Marmorstein, Emile; Marmorstein, Jenny. London: Routledge. ISBN 0-415-07693-5.
- Ruska, Julius (1924). Arabische Alchemisten I. Chālid ibn Jazīd ibn Muʿāwija. Heidelberg: Carl Winter. OCLC 928821937.
- Sezgin, Fuat (1971). Geschichte des arabischen Schrifttums, Band IV: Alchimie, Chemie, Botanik, Agrikultur bis ca. 430 H. Leiden: Brill. pp. 120–126. ISBN 9789004020092.
- Stavenhagen, Lee (1970). "The Original Text of the Latin Morienus". Ambix. 17 (1): 1–12. doi:10.1179/amb.1970.17.1.1.
- Ullmann, Manfred (1978). "Ḫālid Ibn Yazīd und die Alchemie: Eine Legende". Der Islam. 55 (2): 181–218. doi:10.1515/islm.1978.55.2.181.
- Weisser, Ursula (1979). Buch über das Geheimnis der Schöpfung und die Darstellung der Natur (Buch der Ursachen) von Pseudo-Apollonios von Tyana. Sources and Studies in the History of Arabic-Islamic Science. Aleppo: Institute for the History of Arabic Science. OCLC 13597803.
