= Mansur al-Kamili =

- Born: C. 1246; Egypt
- Occupations: Chemist; Metallurgist; Sociologist
- Era: Bahri Mamluk period (13th century)
- Known for: Chemical aspects of medieval minting in Egypt

Mansur ibn Bara adh-Dhahabi al-Kamili, (c.1236) was a medieval Muslim metallurgist, chemist and sociologist in Egypt. Among his works are "Chemical aspects of medieval minting in Egypt" (Kashf al-asrar al-cilmiya bidar al-darb al-Misriya).

== See also ==
- Jabir ibn Hayyan
