= The Matter of Araby in Medieval England =

1977 book by Dorothee Metlitzki

- First edition
- Author: Dorothee Metlitzki
- Language: English
- Subject: History
- Genre: Non-fiction
- Publisher: Yale University Press
- Publication date: 1977
- Publication place: United States
- Media type: Print (Hardcover)
- ISBN: 0-300-02003-1
- OCLC: 2388067
- Dewey Decimal: 820/.9/001
- LC Class: PR128 .M4

The Matter of Araby in Medieval England is a 1977 book by Dorothee Metlitzki in which the author attempts to show the beginnings of the relationship between medieval England and the Arab world. It is considered to be the "definitive work on the intersection of Arabic and English culture in the Middle Ages".

By studying patterns of translation, scholarship and scientific inquiries Metlitzki shows that the Arab world contributed several key elements to the English world, including ancient Greek texts which had been translated into Arabic, scientific discoveries such as the astrolabe and astronomical advances, as well as a host of other things such as rhyming poetry.

The book is divided into two parts: "Scientific and Philosophical Learning" and "The Literary Heritage".

== Summary ==
=== Part One ===
This part of the book consists of four chapters in which Metlitzki explores how scientific achievements were translated and transmitted from Arabic texts to Western (primarily English authors writing in Latin) texts.

She begins this book by addressing the crusades and the development of scholarship by Mozarabs, i.e. Christians living under Muslim rule, particularly those in Muslim Spain and Sicily (p. 3-10).

She writes about several Western scholars who were involved in translating Arabic texts and studying Arab held libraries, including several key ancient Greek and Roman texts that were only available in Arabic.

Some of these scholars included Adelard of Bath (p. 26) who was a Western scholar responsible for translating Al-Khwarizmi’s texts on astronomy and Euclid’s Elements from Arabic into Latin.

She details the lives of several of these key scholars including Petrus Alfonsi, a Christian converted ex-Jew living in Muslim Spain and author of the seminal text Disciplina Clericalis, which, according to Metlitzki was the first collection of Oriental tales composed in the West for Westerners (p. 16). Robert of Ketton was the first translator of the Quran into Latin and also translated several key scientific texts such as Alchemy by Morienus Romanus and Math, Algebra and astronomy texts by Al-Khwarizmi. Michael Scot was a scholar interested in magic, alchemy and astronomy and was also the first translator of most of the works of Aristotle (from Arabic into Latin), whose writings had been banned in the West as being heretical (p. 48).

=== Part Two ===
In part two Metlitzki explores key English medieval texts and suggests that they either are based entirely on Arabic stories or include elements from Arabic storytelling that suggest that they had been loosely based on Arabic stories.

She then suggests that the English medieval Romance itself is strongly influenced by Arabic ideals of romantic chivalry as well as key Arabic stories from various sources including One Thousand and One Nights. The English texts she closely examines include Chaucer’s The Canterbury Tales, the English Charlemagne Romances like Sir Ferumbras and the Sowdone of Babylone (p. 172-3) and several others.

In several of these texts, Metlitzki explains, are found the beginnings of the misunderstanding of Islam by the West and she explores the depiction of Islam and the Islamic prophet Muhammad in these texts in her chapter on History and Romance (p. 95-210).

On page 245 she also suggests that contributions to English and Western literature from Arabic literature includes several key themes (such as Romance) and also rhyming poetry itself.
