= Paul Kraus (Arabist) =

Czech Jewish Arabist (1904–1944)

Eliezer Paul Kraus (11 December 1904 – 10 or 12 October 1944) was a Jewish Arabist born in Prague. He is the author of a number of seminal works on early Arabic philosophy, with a special focus on Arabic alchemy and chemistry. Some of his writings on this subject are still standard reference works in the field today.

Having been educated in Prague and Berlin (where he studied under Julius Ruska), the rise of the Nazis in 1930s Germany forced him to move first to Paris and later to Cairo, where he died in 1944. He allegedly committed suicide or, according to family claims, was politically assassinated.

== Biography ==
Paul Kraus was born in Prague. Kraus was educated in Prague, Berlin (where he met his first wife, Bettina, and received his doctorate in 1929) and Paris.

Kraus was known for his fluency in many oriental languages, including Hebrew, Aramaic, Amharic (Ethiopian), Accadian, Greek, Latin, Arabic and Persian.

In 1925, as a young Zionist, he went to Palestine, living at first on a Kibbutz, but a year later moving to Jerusalem and beginning studies at the newly opened Hebrew University. During this year he was briefly married and divorced. By the end of 1926 he had left Jerusalem and begun a research trip through Lebanon and Turkey, ending in Germany to continue his studies in Berlin.

In 1933, with the Nazis coming to power in Germany and many Jews losing their jobs, Kraus left Berlin for Paris, where he was able to continue his studies under the French Orientalist Louis Massignon. He stayed for three years.

In 1935 he first published a French translation of Abu Bakr al-Razi's Philosophic Life, following it in 1936 with a thesis on the work and importance of Jābir ibn Hayyān (whose name was latinized as Geber) to the science of chemistry. The thesis advanced the possibility that no such person as Geber had ever existed, or that even if he had, the original book might have been written by a group of students, a decade after he died.

In 1936, he was offered positions at three universities: The Holy Muslim University of India, the Hebrew University of Jerusalem, and the University of Cairo. He took up the Cairo offer, moving there in 1937. He worked there at the University of Cairo, teaching Textual criticism and Semitic Languages, as well as at the French Archeological Institute of Cairo.

In 1938 Kraus discovered the Al-Farabi manuscript (the philosophy of Plato and Aristotle and the Commentary on the Laws) in an Istanbul library, and notified his future brother-in-law, Leo Strauss, about it. The two were excited about the prospects of translating, publishing and researching the manuscript. An Al-Farabi conference was called for 1939 in Istanbul, but was canceled due to the outbreak of the Second World War.

According to his Czech language biography, in a 1939 trip to Jerusalem, he regretted turning down the university position, since he discovered that the academic scene was completely changed, bustling with the top researchers of the field, and nothing to be compared with the time he had first been there in 1926.

In 1941, he married Bettina Strauss, the sister of Professor Leo Strauss. The two had been acquainted since the late 1920s and had traveled together to Turkey, Lebanon, Palestine and Egypt for research. Bettina died during the birth of their daughter, Jenny Ann, in 1942.

In 1943, after his second wife's death, he traveled to Jerusalem with his daughter, where he married Dorothee Metlitzki, herself a noted academic and a founder of the Hebrew University.

At that time he was invited to a public debate held at the Hebrew University, where he set out his theory of the coherency of the Old Testament as a series of lyrics, perhaps as an oral tradition, which, he proposed, explained many inconsistencies and repeated parts in the texts. His behavior at the debate was described as "eccentric". His theories were ridiculed, many of his contemporaries shunned him, and it seems he had suffered a nervous breakdown.

After the debate in Jerusalem, he returned to Cairo alone, his new wife remaining in a Jerusalem hospital with a serious illness. The political situation in Cairo began to deteriorate; Kraus's superiors at the University of Cairo were fired. It was clear that there was no future for him in Cairo, but Jerusalem had closed its doors to him as well. Rooms in his apartment were rented to two Lebanese students, Albert Hourani and his brother Cecil; both later to become prominent scholars. They noticed that upon his return from Jerusalem he appeared manic-depressive. Apparently, Kraus was accused of stealing funds that were intended for library purchases.

Several months later during 1944, on October 10 or 12, Kraus was found dead, hanging in the bathroom of Albert Hourani's house. The Egyptian police determined it was suicide, although his family claimed they had proof that Kraus was assassinated for being a Jew or for his ties with Zionism.

His daughter Jenny was adopted by his brother in law Professor Strauss at the age of four. Kraus's papers, which had been stored in the French Institute in Cairo and apparently plundered by other scholars, were finally brought to the United States by his daughter who donated them to the Special Collections Library of the University of Chicago.

== Selected publications ==
- Altbabylonische Briefe: aus der Vorderasiatischen Abteilung der Preussischen Staatsmuseen zu Berlin. Leipzig: J C Hinrichs, 1931.
- Jabir ibn Hayyan (1935). Paul Kraus (ed.). Mukhtar rasaʾil Jabir Ibn Hayyan - Selected Treatises by Jabir ibn Hayyan - مختار رسائل جابر بن حيان. Cairo: al-Khanji Booksellers.
- Essai sur l'histoire des idées scientifiques dans l'Islam. Paris: G P Maisonneuve; Cairo: al-Khanji, 1935.
- Julius Ruska. Bruges, Belgium: Saint Catherine Press, 1938.
- Plato Arabus. Edited by Richard Walzer, Paul Kraus, et al. London: Warburg Institute, 1943.
- Jâbir ibn Hayyân—Contribution à l’histoire des idées scientifiques dans l’Islam—Jâbir et la science grecque. Paris: Les Belles Lettres, 1986.
- Alchemie, Ketzerei, Apokryphen in fruhen Islam: Gesammelte Aufsatze. Edited by Rémi Brague. Hildesheim and New York: Georg Olms Verlag, 1994. A collection of eleven studies by Paul Kraus, containing a brief biography.

== See also ==
- Julius Ruska, his mentor
- Constance E. Padwick

== Sources ==
- Badawī, ʿAbd al-Raḥmān (1993). Mawsūʿat al-mustashriqīn. Beirut: Dār al-ʿIlm li-l-Malāyīn. pp. 464–467.
- Bär, Erika (1994). Bibliographie zur deutschsprachigen Islamwissenschaft und Semitistik vom Anfang des 19. Jahrhunderts bis heute. Band 3. Wiesbaden: Reichert. pp. 97–99. ISBN 9783882267952.
- Brague, Rémi (1994). "Paul Kraus: Person und Werk (1904 – 1944)". In Brague, Rémi (ed.). Paul Kraus: Alchemie, Ketzerei, Apokryphen im frühen Islam. Gesammalte Aufsätze. Hildesheim: Georg Olms Verlag. pp. vii–xiii. ISBN 3-487-09804-0.
- D’Ancona, Cristina (2016). "Paul Kraus. Cahiers (© Jenny Strauss Clay) transcrits et annotés. Théologie d'Aristote, 35". Studia graeco-arabica. 6: 211–258.
- Glick, Thomas F. (1999). "From the Sarton papers: Paul Kraus and Arabic Alchemy". Cronos. 2 (2): 221–244. hdl:10261/101116.
- Kraemer, Joel L. (1999). "The Death of an Orientalist: Paul Kraus from Prague to Cairo". In Kramer, Martin (ed.). The Jewish Discovery of Islam: Studies in Honor of Bernard Lewis. Tel Aviv: The Moshe Dayan Center for Middle Eastern and African Studies. pp. 181–223. ISBN 965-224-040-0.
  - Review in: Irwin, Robert (2000). "The Jewish Discovery of Islam: Studies in Honor of Bernard Lewis by Martin Kramer". Middle Eastern Studies. 36 (3): 244–247. doi:10.1080/00263200008701327. JSTOR 4284101. S2CID 220378507.
- Kuentz, Charles (1945). "Paul Kraus (1904-1944)". Bulletin de l'Institut d'Égypte. 27: 431–441.
- Pacini, Maria (2014). Filosofia greca e cultura araba nell'Egitto del XX secolo. Taha Husayn, Paul Kraus e l'ideale della continuità (MA thesis). Supervised by Cristina D'Ancona. Università di Pisa.
- Ščrbačić, Maja (2013). "Von der Semitistik zur Islamwissenschaften und zurück – Paul Kraus (1904-1944)". In Diner, Dan (ed.). Jahrbuch des Simon-Dubnow-Instituts. Vol. 12. pp. 389–416. ISBN 9783525369425.
- Ščrbačić, Maja (2015). "al-Thaqāfah". In Diner, Dan (ed.). Enzyklopädie jüdischer Geschichte und Kultur. Band 6: Ta – Z. Stuttgart: Metzler. pp. 79–82. doi:10.1007/978-3-476-01221-0 (inactive 18 July 2025). ISBN 978-3-476-02506-7.
- Ščrbačić, Maja (2019). "Exilland Ägypten: Der vergessene Orientalist Paul Kraus". Mimeo: Blog der Doktorandinnen und Doktoranden Am Dubnow-Institut.
- Shumays, ʿAbd al-Munʿim (1989). Ḥarāfīsh al-Qāhira. Cairo: Dār al-Maʿārif. pp. 106–114.
- Strohmaier, Gotthard (1980). "Paul Kraus und die Erforschung des Ǧābirkorpus". Tradition und Fortschritt in der medizin-historischen Arbeit des Berliner Instituts für Geschichte der Medizin. Materialien des wissenschaftlichen Festkolloquiums anläßlich des 50. Jahrestages der Gründung des Instituts am 1. April 1980. Berlin: Institut für Geschichte der Medizin. pp. 74–79.
