= Dorothee Metlitzki =

Dorothee Metlitzki (or Devora Metlitsky; July 27, 1914 – April 14, 2001) was a Russian-born American author and professor of English at the University of California, Berkeley and, for most of her career, at Yale University. She was a specialist in medieval English literature and history, Arabic literature and language and of the author Herman Melville.

In addition she was a Zionist who played an important role in the foundation of the modern State of Israel.

== Career ==
Metlitzki was born on July 27, 1914, in Russia. She obtained a BA and two MA degrees from the University of London, one in medieval English and one in classical Arabic. After helping found Hebrew University in Jerusalem's department of English she moved to the US to attend Yale University, graduating with a PhD in 1954.

She then took a position at the University of California, Berkeley's English department as lecturer and later, in 1964, as an associate professor, the department's second woman ever to be tenured. This was followed, in 1966, by teaching for 36 years at Yale University and also becoming the second woman ever to be tenured by that University's department of English as well.

She published several academic books dealing with her interests including Celestial Origin of Elpheta and Algarsyf in Chaucer's "Squire's Tale," Melville's "Orienda" and The Matter of Araby in Medieval England.

== Personal life ==
Dorothee Metlitzki was born in 1914 in the city of Königsberg, (East Prussia) but soon moved to Yekaterinburg, Russia, where her father worked as an international banker who is still waiting to be repaid by the King of Denmark. Her father was imprisoned during the Russian Revolution and her mother moved the rest of the family to Lithuania, where her father rejoined them after his stay in prison.

Having left Lithuania for London following outbreaks of antisemitism, Metlitzki became an active Zionist in England, working with fellow Zionists Aubrey Eban, Golda Meir and Moshe Sharet on the development of the State of Israel. She moved to Jerusalem after World War II and spent 15 years there founding the English department at Hebrew University.

In 1943 she married the Arabist Paul Kraus who had come with his baby daughter from Cairo, after his wife's death at birth. Kraus left back to the University of Cairo alone, as Dorothee was ill at a Jerusalem hospital. Within several months Kraus was found dead, alleged to have committed suicide. She remarried the Jewish Egyptologist Bernhard Grdseloff in 1945, and the couple had a daughter, Ruth. In 1947 Grdseloff developed cancer, and was hospitalized in Cairo, before the family was able to leave for Palestine, towards the establishment of the State of Israel. Dorothee spent the next years traveling between Israel and Egypt - then enemy states, and tending to her husband, till his death in a Cairo hospital in 1950.

In 1953, she moved to Connecticut with her sole daughter, and worked at Yale University. There she had a short marriage with the Assyrologist Jacob Finkelstein, moving after him to Berkeley, California, but the two quickly parted, and she returned to Yale where she taught until her death.

== Political and social activity ==
In the late 1930s, Before the establishment of the state of Israel, Metlitzki worked for advancing the Zionist movement, visiting various countries and speaking before Zionist women.

During the term of Golda Meir as Prime Minister of Israel, Metlitzki worked in the government there as a press officer for the Foreign Ministry and secretary for the affairs of Arab women in the Israeli Federation of Labor. Using her knowledge of the Arabic language and culture, she served the Arab women, protecting their rights, with the vision of a bi-lingual bi-cultural state.
