= Henry Ernest Stapleton =

Historian of chemistry

- Born: 1878; Boroughbridge, Yorkshire, England
- Died: 1962 (aged 83–84)
- Education: Bradford Grammar School; St John's College, Oxford

Henry Ernest Stapleton (1878–1962) was an English chemist, historian of chemistry, Arabist, linguist, and numismatist specializing in the history of alchemy and chemistry in the medieval Islamic world.

== Biography ==
Born in Boroughbridge, Yorkshire, Stapleton attended Bradford Grammar School and St John's College, Oxford. He took a First in Chemistry (1899), did a year of research in Cambridge, then entered the Indian Education Service. His career was interrupted by the First World War: in 1915, he was commissioned first in the Indian Army Reserve, then joined the 24th Punjabis in Mesopotamia. He was in action at Ctesiphon and involved in the retreat to Kut-el-Amarah, and after his surrender, he spent two and a half years in a Turkish prison camp.

Already an Oriental scholar, he used the time in captivity to study. After the war, he spent some time in Oxford and Jersey, and in late 1919 resumed his career with the Indian Education Service, in positions of leadership, including Principal of Presidency College Calcutta, and Special Officer for the opening of Dacca University. He retired in 1933, went to Jersey, and in 1935 visited India again to catalogue and advise on the preservation of manuscripts in the library of Hyderabad University. He returned to Jersey, where he had a herd of Jersey cattle and experimented to try and increase the butter-fat content of their milk, and continued to research and engage with learned societies.

Stapleton served as the secretary of the 30-member Executive Committee to run the newly opened Dacca Museum (now Bangladesh National Museum) on 7 August in 1913.

Stapleton was a keen numismatist, specialising in Indian coins, and bequeathed his collection to the Ashmolean Museum.

== Publications ==
- 1900 Tetrazoline, Transactions of the Chemical Society 75. (with Siegfried Ruhemann)
- 1900 The Formation of Heterocyclic Compounds, Transactions of the Chemical Society 77. (with Siegfried Ruhemann)
- 1900 Condensation of Ethyl Acetylenedicarboxylate with Bases and P-Ketonic Esters, Transactions of the Chemical Society 77. (with Siegfried Ruhemann)
- 1900 Condensation of Phenols with Esters of the Acetylene Series. Part III. Synthesis of Benzo-y-pyrone, Transactions of the Chemical Society 77. (with Siegfried Ruhemann)
- 1905 Sal-Ammoniac: a Study in Primitive Chemistry. Memoirs of the Asiatic Society of Bengal I, No. 2, 25-42.
- 1905 Alchemical Equipment in the Eleventh Century, A.D., Memoirs of the Asiatic Society of Bengal I, No. 4, 47-70. (with R.F. Azo)
- 1910 An Alchemical Compilation of the Thirteenth Century, A.D. Memoirs of the Asiatic Society of Bengal, 3, No. 2, 57-94. (with R.F. Azo)
- 1922 Contributions to the history and ethnology of North-Eastern India. III: The origin of the Catholic Christians of Eastern Bengal. Together with an appendix on the History of the Portuguese in Eastern Bengal
- 1927 Chemistry in 'Iraq and Persia in the Tenth Century A.D., Memoirs of the Asiatic Society of Bengal 8, No. 6, 317-418. (with R.F. Azo and M. Hidayat Husain)
- 1929 A Find of I82 Silver Coins of Kings of the Husainl and Surn Dynasties from Raipara, Thdna Dohar, District Dacca, Eastern Bengal, Journal and Proceedings of the Asiatic Society of Bengal N.S.25, Numismatic Supplement, 5-22.
- 1931 Memoirs of Gaur and Pandua by M. ʿĀbid ʿAlī Khān (18 editions, 1931-1986)
- 1931 Arabic Source of Zadith's 'Tabula Chemica', Nature 127, 926. (with M. Hidayat Husain)
- 1932 Note on the Arabic MSS. on Alchemy in the Asafiyah Library, Hyderabad (Deccan) India, Archeion 14, 57-61.
- 1932 Report on the Ma' al-Waraqi, Archeion 14, 74-75. (with M. Hidayat Husain)
- 1933 Three Arabic Treatises on Alchemy by Muhammad Bin Umail (10th Century A.D.). Edition of the Texts by M. Turab 'All; Excursus on the Writings and Date of Ibn Umail with Edition of the Latin Rendering of the Md' al- Waraqi, Memoirs of the Asiatic Society of Bengal 12, No. I, 1-2I3. (with M. Hidayat Husain)
- 1936 Further Notes on the Arabic Alchemical Manuscripts in the Libraries of India. Isis 26, 127-131.
- 1949 The Sayings of Hermes Quoted in the Ma' al-Waraqi of Ibn Umail, Ambix 3. (with G.L. Lewis and F. Sherwood Taylor)
- 1949 Butter-fat percentages in the milk of island cows
- 1951 The Antiquity of Alchemy, Archives Internationales d'Histoire des Sciences No. 14, 35-38.
- 1952 Probable Sources of the Numbers on which Jabirian Alchemy was Based, Bulletin of the British Society for the History of Science I.
- 1953 Origin of Short-horned Cattle. Bulletin of the Societe jersiaise 16, 100- 102.
- 1953 The Antiquity of A (Group II) of VIth International Congress of the History of the Sciences, Amsterdam, 14-21 August 1950.
- 1953 Probable Sources of the Numbers on which Jabirian Alchemy was based, Archives Internationales d'Histoire des Sciences No. 22, 44-59.
- 1954 The 'Standards' of Alaja Hoyuk. Proceedings of the 23rd International Congress of Orientalists (Cambridge, 21-28 August 1954), 139-141.
- 1956 The Hand (with its 5 fingers) as the primitive basis of Geometry, Arithmetic and Algebra. Actes du VIIIe Congres International d'Histoire des Sciences (Florence, 3-9 September I956), I 103.
- 1957 The Gnomon as a possible link between (a) one type of Mesopotamian Ziggurat and (b) the Magic Square Numbers on which Jabirian Alchemy was based, Ambix 6, 1-9.
- 1958 Ancient and Modern Aspects of Pythagoreanism, Osiris 13, I 2-53.
- 1962 Two Alchemical Treatises Attributed to Avicenna, Ambix I0, 41-82 (with R.F. Azo, M. Hidayat Husain and G.L. Lewis)

== Obituaries ==
- D. McKie. "Henry Ernest Stapleton (1878–1962)", Ambix, 11:3 (1963), pp. 101-104, DOI: 10.1179/amb.1963.11.3.101
