= History of zoology through 1859 =

The history of zoology before Charles Darwin's 1859 theory of evolution traces the organized study of the animal kingdom from ancient to modern times. Although the concept of zoology as a single coherent field arose much later, systematic study of zoology is seen in the works of Aristotle and Galen in the ancient Greco-Roman world. This work was developed in the Middle Ages by Islamic medicine and scholarship, and their work was in turn extended by European scholars such as Albertus Magnus.

During the European Renaissance and early modern period, zoological thought was revolutionized in Europe by a renewed interest in empiricism and the discovery of many novel organisms. Prominent in this movement were the anatomist Vesalius and the physiologist William Harvey, who used experimentation and careful observation, and naturalists such as Carl Linnaeus and Buffon who began to classify the diversity of life and the fossil record, as well as the development and behavior of organisms. Microscopy revealed the previously unknown world of microorganisms, paving the way for cell theory. The growing importance of natural theology, partly a response to the rise of mechanical philosophy, encouraged the growth of natural history (although it entrenched the argument from design).

Over the 18th and 19th centuries, zoology became an increasingly professional scientific discipline. Explorer-naturalists such as Alexander von Humboldt investigated the interaction between organisms and their environment, and the ways this relationship depends on geography—laying the foundations for biogeography, ecology and ethology. Naturalists began to reject essentialism and consider the importance of extinction and the mutability of species. Cell theory provided a new perspective on the fundamental basis of life. These developments, as well as the results from embryology and paleontology, were synthesized in Charles Darwin's theory of evolution by natural selection. In 1859, Darwin placed the theory of organic evolution on new footing through his discovery of a process by which it could occur, and observational evidence suggesting that it had done so.

== Pre-scientific zoology ==
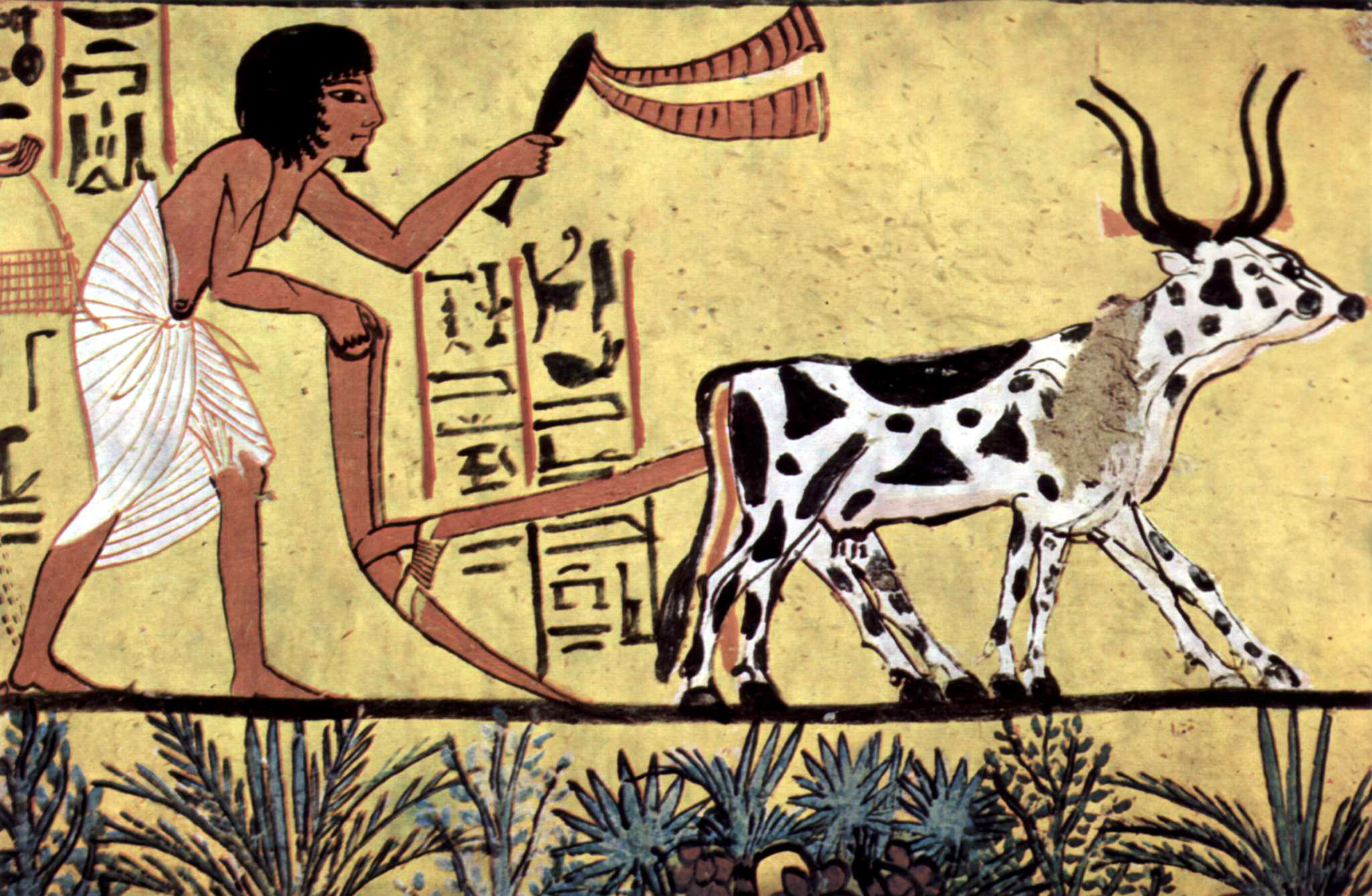
An ancient Egyptian plows his fields with a pair of oxen, used as beasts of burden and a source of food.

The earliest humans must have gathered and transmitted knowledge about animals to increase their chances of survival. This may have included unsystematic knowledge of human and animal anatomy and aspects of animal behavior (such as migration patterns). With the Neolithic Revolution (about 10,000 years ago), humans domesticated animals, and in civilizations such as those of ancient Egypt, pastoralism and farming emerged as alternatives to the hunter-gatherer lifestyle.

=== Ancient eastern cultures ===
The ancient cultures of Mesopotamia, the Indian subcontinent, and China, among others, produced renowned surgeons and students of the natural sciences such as Susruta and Zhang Zhongjing, reflecting sophisticated and independent systems of natural philosophy. Taoist philosophers, such as Zhuangzi in the 4th century BC, expressed ideas related to evolution, such as denying the fixity of biological species and speculating that species had developed differing attributes in response to differing environments. The ancient Indian Ayurveda tradition developed a theory of three humors, resembling but unrelated to the four humors of ancient Greek medicine (and including further complications, such as the body being composed of five elements and seven basic tissues). Ayurvedic writers also classified living things into four categories based on the way they were born (from the womb, from eggs, from seeds, or via heat and moisture) and explained the conception of a fetus in detail. They also made considerable advances in the field of surgery, often without the use of human dissection or animal vivisection. One of the first known Ayurvedic treatises was the Sushruta Samhita, attributed to Sushruta in the 6th century BC. It can be considered an early contribution to the materia medica genre, describing 700 medicinal plants, 64 preparations from mineral sources, and 57 preparations based on animal sources. Notwithstanding such developments, the roots of modern zoology are usually traced back to the secular tradition of ancient Greek philosophy.

=== Ancient Greek traditions ===
The pre-Socratic philosophers asked many questions about life but produced little systematic knowledge of specifically zoological interest—though the attempts of the atomists to explain life in purely physical terms would recur periodically through the history of zoology. However, the medical theories of Hippocrates and his followers, especially humorism, had a lasting impact.

== Aristotelian zoology ==
=== Aristotle ===
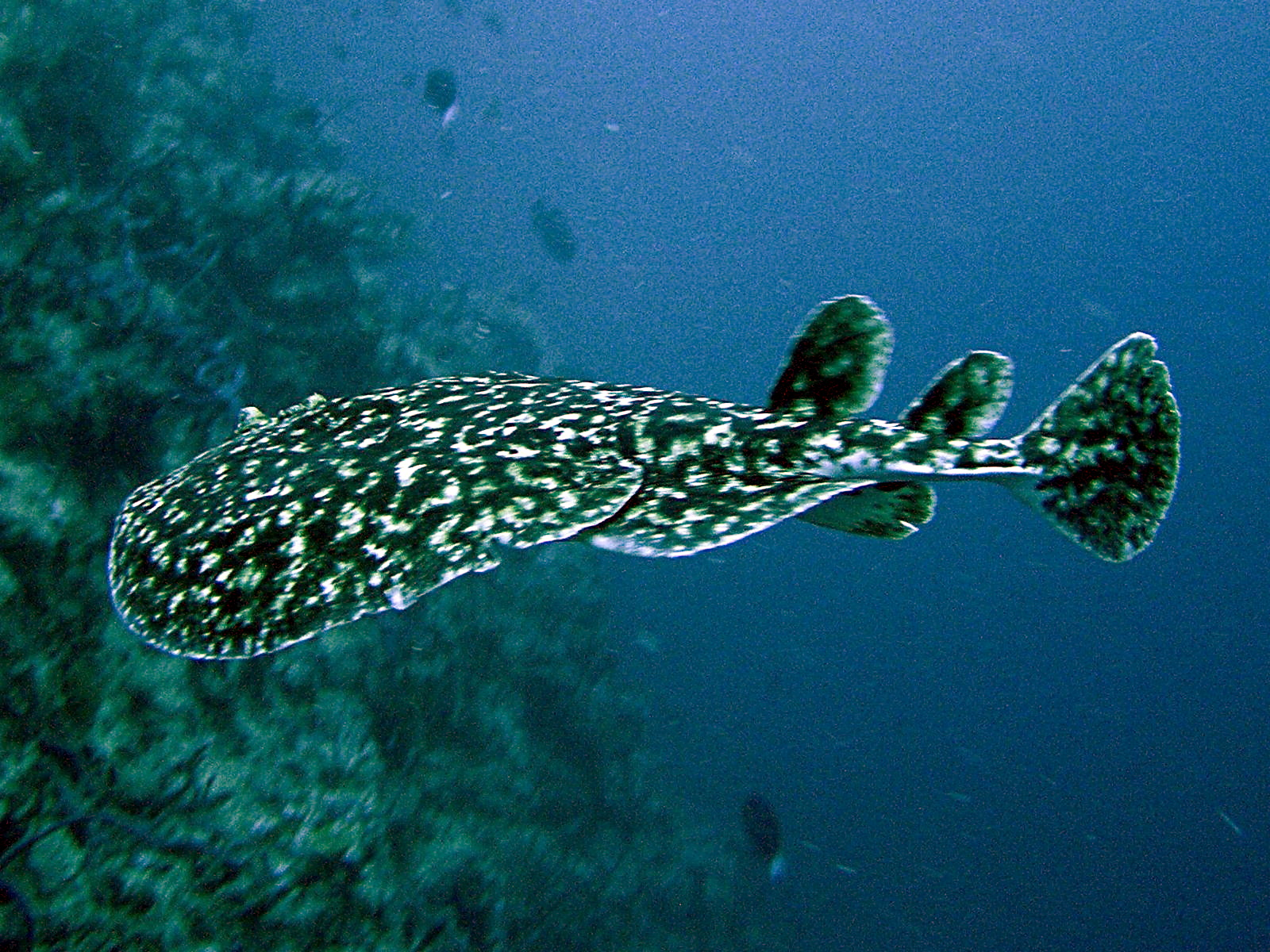
Aristotle reported correctly that electric rays were able to stun their prey.

The philosopher Aristotle created the science of biology, basing its theory on both his metaphysical principles and on observation. He proposed theories for the processes of metabolism, temperature regulation, information processing, embryonic development, and inheritance. He made detailed observations of nature, especially the habits and attributes of animals in the sea at Lesbos. He classified 540 animal species, and dissected at least 50.

Aristotle, and nearly all Western scholars after him until the 18th century, believed that creatures were arranged in a graded scale of perfection rising from plants on up to humans: the scala naturae or Great Chain of Being.

=== Hellenistic zoology ===
A few scholars in the Hellenistic period under the Ptolemies—particularly Herophilus of Chalcedon and Erasistratus of Chios—amended Aristotle's physiological work, even performing experimental dissections and vivisections. Claudius Galen became the most important authority on medicine and anatomy. Though a few ancient atomists such as Lucretius challenged the teleological Aristotelian viewpoint that all aspects of life are the result of design or purpose, teleology (and after the rise of Christianity, natural theology) remained central to biological thought until the 18th and 19th centuries.

=== Medieval and Islamic zoology ===
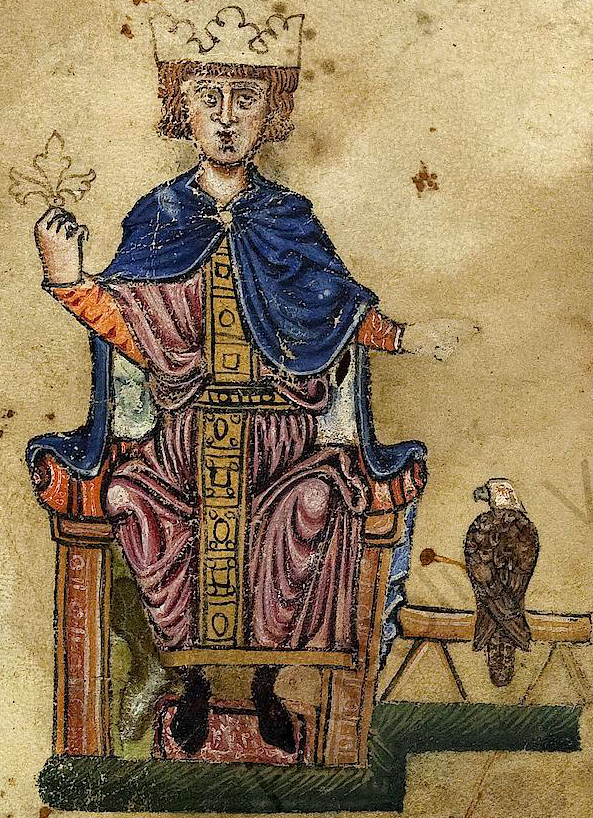
Frederick II's influential De arte venandi explored bird morphology.

The decline of the Roman Empire led to the disappearance or destruction of much knowledge, though physicians still incorporated many aspects of the Aristotelian tradition into training and practice. In Byzantium and the Islamic world, many of Aristotle's works were translated into Arabic and commented upon by scholars such as Avicenna and Averroes. Medieval bestiaries blended real and mythologized observations with Christian moral allegory.

Medieval Muslim physicians, scientists and philosophers made significant contributions to zoological knowledge between the 8th and 13th centuries during the Islamic Golden Age. The Arab scholar al-Jahiz (781–869) described the idea of a food chain, and was an early adherent of environmental determinism.

During the High Middle Ages, a few European scholars such as Hildegard of Bingen, Albertus Magnus and Frederick II expanded the natural history canon. Magnus's De animalibus libri XXVI was one of the most extensive studies of zoological observation published before modern times.

== Renaissance and early modern ==
=== From anatomy to systematic taxonomy ===
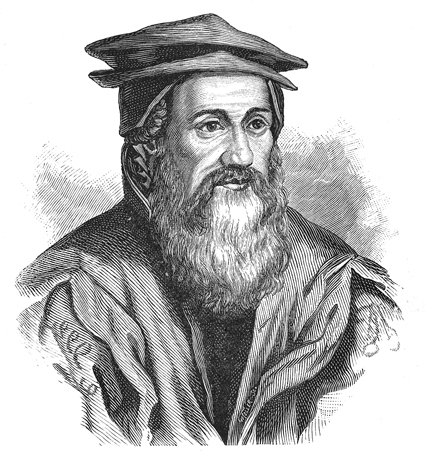
Conrad Gesner (1516–1565). His Historiae animalium is considered the beginning of modern zoology.

The Renaissance was the age of collectors and travellers, when many of the stories were actually demonstrated as true when the living or preserved specimens were brought to Europe. Verification by collecting of things, instead of the accumulation of anecdotes, then became more common, and scholars developed a new faculty of careful observation. The Renaissance brought expanded interest in both empirical natural history and physiology. In 1543, Andreas Vesalius inaugurated the modern era of Western medicine with his seminal human anatomy treatise De humani corporis fabrica, which was based on dissection of corpses. Vesalius was the first in a series of anatomists who gradually replaced scholasticism with empiricism in physiology and medicine, relying on first-hand experience rather than authority and abstract reasoning. Bestiaries—a genre that combines both the natural and figurative knowledge of animals—also became more sophisticated. Conrad Gessner's great zoological work, Historiae animalium, appeared in four volumes, 1551–1558, at Zürich, a fifth being issued in 1587. His works were the starting-point of modern zoology. Other major works were produced by William Turner, Pierre Belon, Guillaume Rondelet, and Ulisse Aldrovandi. Artists such as Albrecht Dürer and Leonardo da Vinci, often working with naturalists, were also interested in the bodies of animals and humans, studying physiology in detail and contributing to the growth of anatomical knowledge. Jan van Kessel the Elder and Joris Hoefnagel dedicated much of their work to entomological studies.

Jan van Kessel's Insects and a Sprig of Rosemary

In the 17th century, the enthusiasts of the new sciences, the investigators of nature by means of observation and experiment, banded themselves into academies or societies for mutual support and discourse. The first founded of surviving European academies, the Academia Naturae Curiosorum (1651) especially confined itself to the description and illustration of the structure of plants and animals; eleven years later (1662) the Royal Society of London was incorporated by royal charter, having existed without a name or fixed organization for seventeen years previously (from 1645). A little later the Academy of Sciences of Paris was established by Louis XIV, later still the Royal Society of Sciences in Uppsala was founded. Systematizing, naming and classifying dominated zoology throughout the 17th and 18th centuries. Carl Linnaeus published a basic taxonomy for the natural world in 1735 (variations of which have been in use ever since), and in the 1750s introduced scientific names for all his species. While Linnaeus conceived of species as unchanging parts of a designed hierarchy, the other great naturalist of the 18th century, Georges-Louis Leclerc, Comte de Buffon, treated species as artificial categories and living forms as malleable—even suggesting the possibility of common descent. Though he was writing in an era before evolution was recognized, Buffon is a key figure in the history of evolutionary thought; his "transformist" theory would influence the evolutionary theories of both Jean-Baptiste Lamarck and Charles Darwin.

Before the Age of Exploration, naturalists had little idea of the sheer scale of biological diversity. The discovery and description of new species and the collection of specimens became a passion of scientific gentlemen and a lucrative enterprise for entrepreneurs; many naturalists traveled the globe in search of scientific knowledge and adventure.

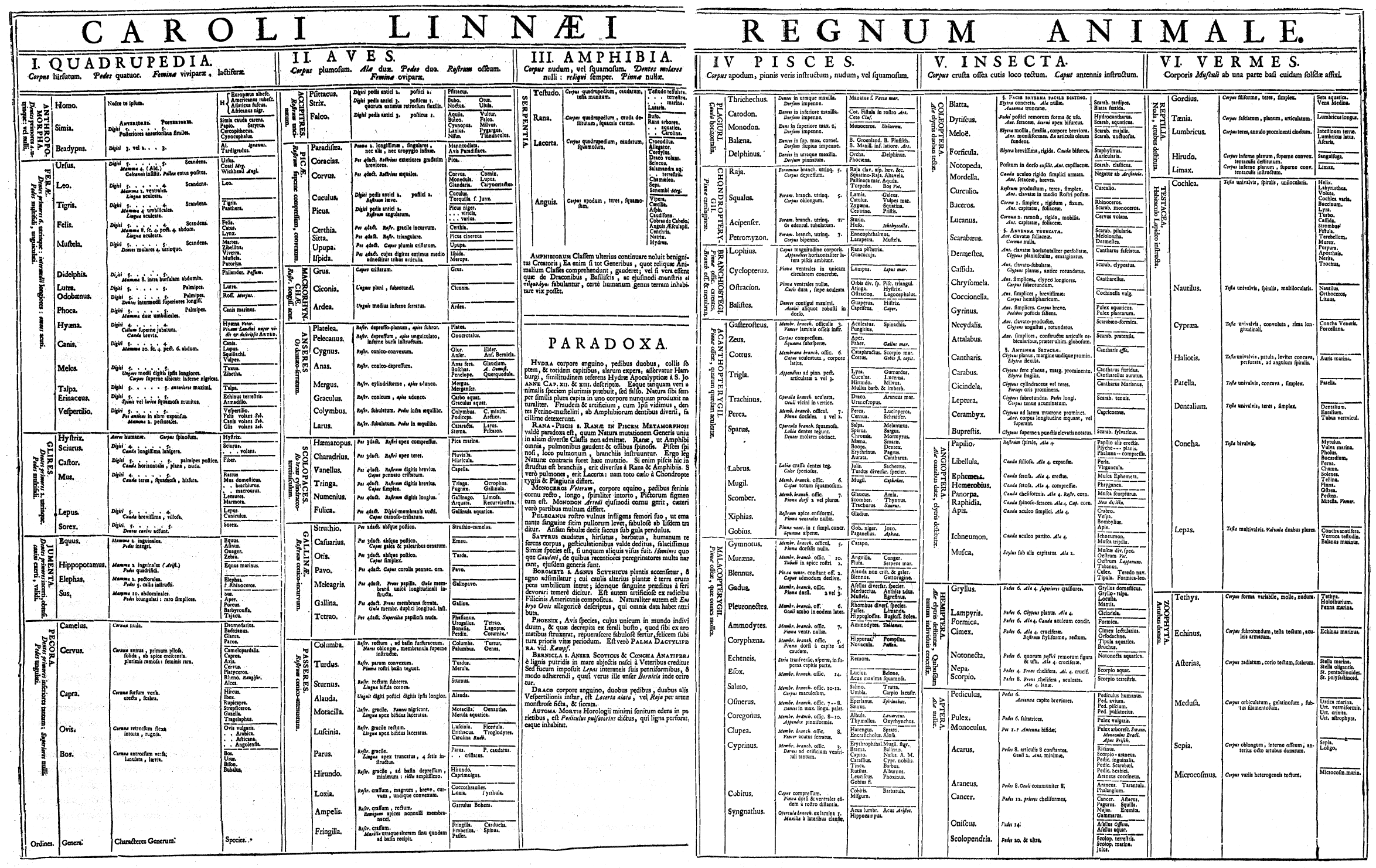
Table of the Animal Kingdom ("Regnum Animale") from the 1st edition of Linnaeus' Systema Naturae (1735)

Extending the work of Vesalius into experiments on still living bodies (of both humans and animals), William Harvey investigated the roles of blood, veins and arteries. Harvey's De motu cordis in 1628 was the beginning of the end for Galenic theory, and alongside Santorio Santorio's studies of metabolism, it served as an influential model of quantitative approaches to physiology.

=== Impact of the microscope ===
In the early 17th century, the micro-world of zoology was just beginning to open up. A few lensmakers and natural philosophers had been creating crude microscopes since the late 16th century, and Robert Hooke published the seminal Micrographia based on observations with his own compound microscope in 1665. But it was not until Antony van Leeuwenhoek's dramatic improvements in lensmaking beginning in the 1670s—ultimately producing up to 200-fold magnification with a single lens—that scholars discovered spermatozoa, bacteria, infusoria and the sheer strangeness and diversity of microscopic life. Similar investigations by Jan Swammerdam led to new interest in entomology and built the basic techniques of microscopic dissection and staining.

Debate over the flood described in the Bible catalyzed the development of paleontology; in 1669 Nicholas Steno published an essay on how the remains of living organisms could be trapped in layers of sediment and mineralized to produce fossils. Although Steno's ideas about fossilization were well known and much debated among natural philosophers, an organic origin for all fossils would not be accepted by all naturalists until the end of the 18th century due to philosophical and theological debate about issues such as the age of the earth and extinction.

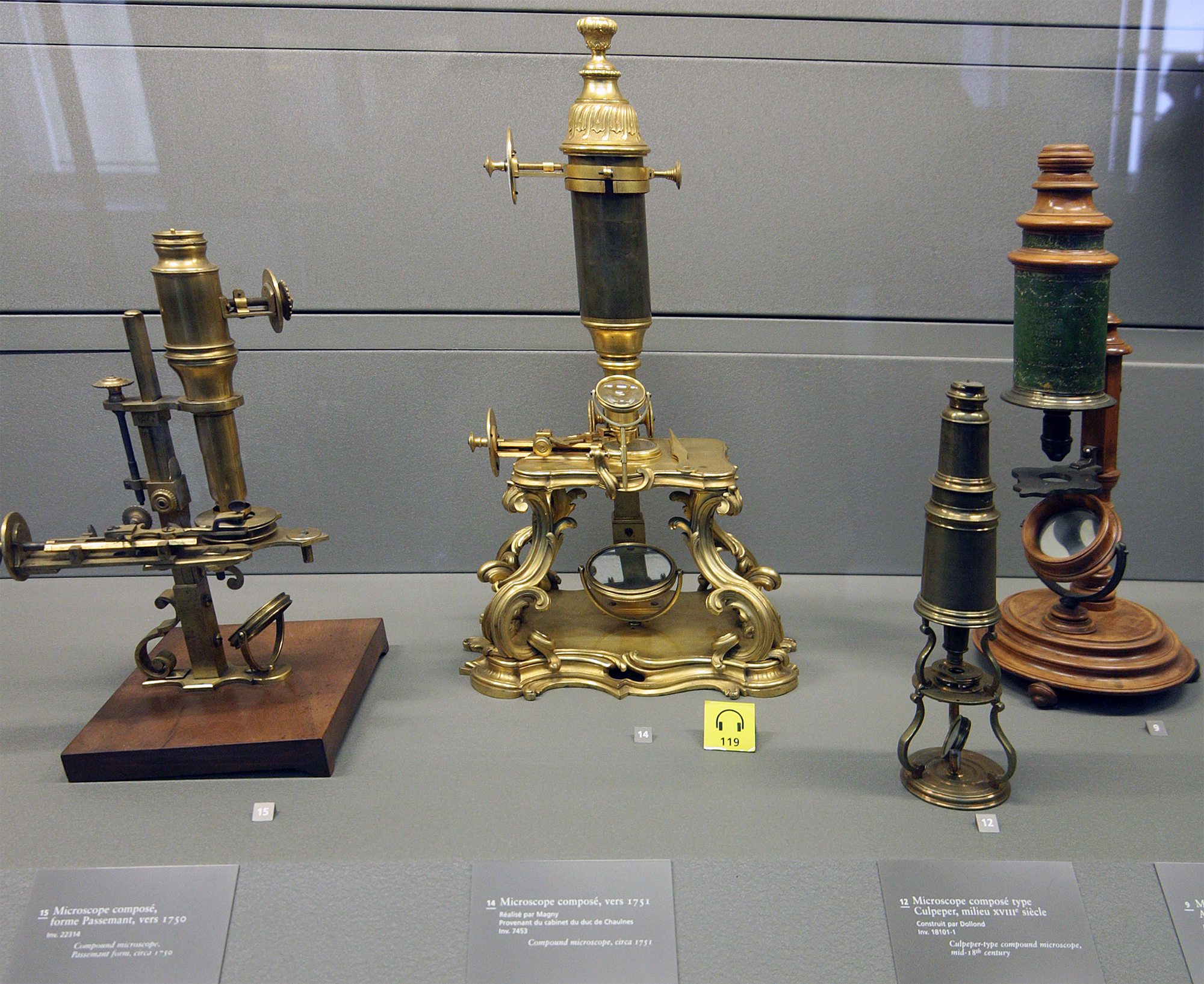
18th century microscopes from the Musée des Arts et Métiers, Paris

Advances in microscopy also had a profound impact on biological thinking. In the early 19th century, a number of biologists pointed to the central importance of the cell. In 1838 and 1839, Schleiden and Schwann began promoting the ideas that (1) the basic unit of organisms is the cell and (2) that individual cells have all the characteristics of life, though they opposed the idea that (3) all cells come from the division of other cells. Thanks to the work of Robert Remak and Rudolf Virchow, however, by the 1860s most biologists accepted all three tenets of what came to be known as cell theory.

== In advance of On the Origin of Species ==
Up through the 19th century, the scope of zoology was largely divided between physiology, which investigated questions of form and function, and natural history, which was concerned with the diversity of life and interactions among different forms of life and between life and non-life. By 1900, much of these domains overlapped, while natural history (and its counterpart natural philosophy) had largely given way to more specialized scientific disciplines—cytology, bacteriology, morphology, embryology, geography, and geology. Widespread travel by naturalists in the early-to-mid-19th century resulted in a wealth of new information about the diversity and distribution of living organisms. Of particular importance was the work of Alexander von Humboldt, which analyzed the relationship between organisms and their environment (i.e., the domain of natural history) using the quantitative approaches of natural philosophy (i.e., physics and chemistry). Humboldt's work laid the foundations of biogeography and inspired several generations of scientists.

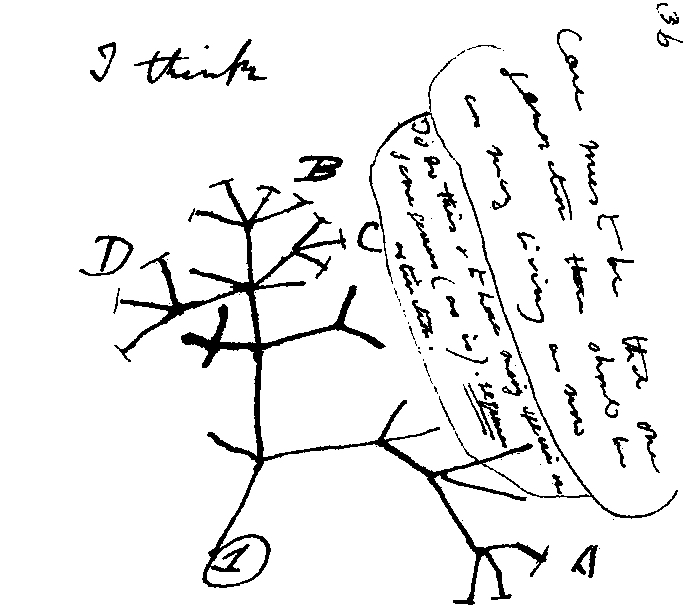
Charles Darwin's first sketch of an evolutionary tree from his First Notebook on Transmutation of Species (1837)

The emerging discipline of geology also brought natural history and natural philosophy closer together; Georges Cuvier and others made great strides in comparative anatomy and paleontology in the late 1790s and early 19th century. In a series of lectures and papers that made detailed comparisons between living mammals and fossil remains Cuvier was able to establish that the fossils were remains of species that had become extinct—rather than being remains of species still alive elsewhere in the world, as had been widely believed. Fossils discovered and described by Gideon Mantell, William Buckland, Mary Anning, and Richard Owen among others helped establish that there had been an 'age of reptiles' that had preceded even the prehistoric mammals. These discoveries captured the public imagination and focused attention on the history of life on earth.

Charles Darwin, combining the biogeographical approach of Humboldt, the uniformitarian geology of Lyell, Thomas Malthus's writings on population growth, and his own morphological expertise, created a more successful evolutionary theory based on natural selection; similar evidence led Alfred Russel Wallace to independently reach the same conclusions. Charles Darwin's early interest in nature led him on a five-year voyage on HMS Beagle which established him as an eminent geologist whose observations and theories supported Charles Lyell's uniformitarian ideas, and publication of his journal of the voyage made him famous as a popular author. Puzzled by the geographical distribution of wildlife and fossils he collected on the voyage, Darwin investigated the transmutation of species and conceived his theory of natural selection in 1838. Although he discussed his ideas with several naturalists, he needed time for extensive research and his geological work had priority. He was writing up his theory in 1858 when Alfred Russel Wallace sent him an essay which described the same idea, prompting immediate joint publication of both of their theories. Darwin's On the Origin of Species, published on 24 November 1859, a seminal work of scientific literature, was to be the foundation of evolutionary biology.

== See also ==
- History of zoology
- List of zoologists
- List of Russian zoologists
- Important publications in zoology
- Timeline of zoology

== Sources ==
- Desmond, Adrian J.; Moore, James (1991). Darwin. Warner Books.
