= Syed Nomanul Haq =

Pakistani historian (1948–present)

Syed Nomanul Haq سید نعمان الحق
- Born: February 15, 1948 (age 78); Karachi, Pakistan
- Occupation: Professor of Humanities
- Known for: Historical and philosophical scholarship.

Academic background
- Education: University College London, Hull University

Academic work
- Institutions: Institute of Business Administration, Lahore University of Management Sciences, University of Pennsylvania
- Main interests: Poetry, Philosophy, Sufism

Syed Nomanul Haq (Nu'man al-Haqq) (Urdu: سید نعمان الحق; born February 15, 1948 in Karachi, Pakistan) is a Pakistani scholar and historian specialised in the fields of Islamic history and Islamic philosophy. He is currently a visiting distinguished professor at the Habib University, Karachi.

== Life and career ==
Nomanul Haq was born in Pakistan, but spent most of his early life in England and the USA. At Hull University he received an undergraduate degree in applied physics and at University College London he studied the history of science and philosophy.

In his career spanning twenty years, Nomanul Haq has produced publications and editorial and research work on the history and philosophy of science, postmodern philosophy, history of religion, history of art and history of literature.

Nomanul Haq has published a number of books and newspaper articles. He writes both in English and in Urdu.

In 2009, he contributed to a seminar at the Metanexus Institute.

Noman has extended family in Pakistan, but his immediate family resides in the United States. Noman was married at the early age of 18.

== Bibliography ==
- Names, Natures, and Things: The Alchemist Jaabir ibn Hayyaan and his Kitaab al-Ahjaar (Book of Stones). Dordrecht/London/ Boston: Kluwer Academic Publishers, 1993 (Cloth). Paperback Edition, 1995.
- With Ted Peters and Muzaffar Iqbal, God, Life, and the Cosmos: Theistic Perspectives. Aldershot: Ashgate Publishing, 2002.
- Harris Khalique, Select Verses, with an Analytical Introduction and Annotation (in Urdu). Karachi: Maktaba-e Daniyal, 2006.
- Refiner’s Fire: Some Reflections on Neville, Postmodernism, and the Tends in Discourses on Islam in P. Heltzel and A. Yong eds. Theology in a Global Context: Essays in Honor of Robert Neville. New York/London: Continuum, T & T Clark International, 2004.
- Islam and Ecology: Toward Retrieval and Reconstruction. Daedalus. Fall 2001. Vol. 130, No. 4, 141-177.
- Occult Sciences and Medicine. New Cambridge History of Islam. Vol. 3, Michael Cook ed.-in-chief. Cambridge: Cambridge University Press, 2007.
