= History of hermeneutics =

Hermeneutics is the theory and methodology of interpretation. The tradition of Western hermeneutics starts in the writings of Aristotle and continues to the modern era.

== Aristotle and Plato ==
In De Interpretatione, Aristotle offers a theory which lays the groundwork for many later theories of interpretation and semiotics:

Equally important to later developments are some ancient texts on poetry, rhetoric, and sophistry:

- Aristotle's Poetics, Rhetoric, and On Sophistical Refutations
- Plato's dialogues, Cratylus, Ion, Gorgias, Lesser Hippias, and The Republic

However, these texts deal with the presentation and refutation of arguments, speeches, and poems rather than with the understanding of texts per se. As Ramberg and Gjesdal note, "Only with the Stoics, and their reflections on the interpretation of myth, do we encounter something like a methodological awareness of the problems of textual understanding."

In The Republic, Socrates denies poets entry into his "just city set up in speech" until they can prove their value. In Ion, Plato famously portrays poets as possessed. Poetry thus becomes open to ridicule. Whatever hints of truth it may have, this truth is covered up by madness. However, another line of thinking arose with Theagenes of Rhegium, who suggested that, instead of taking poetry literally, it ought to be taken as allegories of nature. Stoic philosophers further developed this idea, reading into poetry both allegories of nature and allegories of ethical behavior.

Words spoken are symbols or signs (symbola) of affections or impressions (pathemata) of the soul (psyche); written words are the signs of words spoken.

As writing, so also is speech not the same for all races of men.

But the mental affections themselves, of which these words are primarily signs (semeia), are the same for the whole of mankind, as are also the objects (pragmata) of which those affections are representations or likenesses, images, copies (homoiomata). [De Interpretatione, 1.16^{a}4]

You know, none of the epic poets, if they're good, are masters of their subject; they are inspired, possessed, and that is how they utter all those beautiful poems. The same goes for lyric poets if they're good: just as the Corybantes are not in their right minds when they dance, lyric poets, too, are not in their right minds when they make those beautiful lyrics, but as soon as they sail into harmony and rhythm they are possessed by Bacchic frenzy. [Plato, Ion, 533e–534a]

Aristotle differed with his teacher, Plato, about the worth of poetry. Both saw art as an act of mimesis, but where Plato at times saw a pale, essentially false imitation of reality, Aristotle saw the possibility of truth in imitation. As critic David Richter points out, "For Aristotle, artists must disregard incidental facts to search for deeper universal truths." Thus, instead of being essentially false, poetry may be universally true.

=== Apostolic Fathers ===
The principle of prophecy fulfillment was carried over from the Apostolic Age and was continued up to the beginning of the 3rd century A.D. For example, Irenaeus dedicates an entire chapter of Against Heresies to the defense of Isaiah 7:14, which was one of the chief prophecies used to validate Jesus as the Messiah.

Even more than Irenaeus, the second century apologists tended to interpret and utilize most scripture as if it were primarily for the purpose of showing prophecy fulfillment. Prominent among these was Justin Martyr, who made extensive use of scripture to this end. Examples of prophecy fulfillment can be seen in his Apology, in which chapters 31–53 are specifically dedicated to proving through prophecy that Jesus was the Messiah. He uses scripture similarly in Dialogue with Trypho.

Here Justin demonstrates that prophecy fulfillment supersedes logical context in hermeneutics. He ignores the Christological issues that arise from equating Jesus with the golden calf of Bethel, which is the "him" that is being brought to the king in Hosea 10:6.

And when Herod succeeded Archelaus, having received the authority which had been allotted to him, Pilate sent to him by way of compliment Jesus bound; and God foreknowing that this would happen, had thus spoken: "And they brought Him to the Assyrian, a present to the king."

It is likely that the preeminence of prophecy fulfillment was a product of the circumstances of the early church. The primary intent of early authors was a defense of Christianity against attacks from paganism and Judaism, as well as suppressing what were considered to be schismatic or heretical groups. To this end, Martin Jan Mulder suggested that prophecy fulfillment was the primary hermeneutical method because Roman society placed a high value upon both antiquity and oracles. By using the Old Testament (a term linked with supersessionism) to validate Jesus, early Christians sought to tap into both the antiquity of the Jewish scriptures and the oracles of the prophets.

== Late antiquity ==
Two divergent schools of thought emerged during this period, which extends from 200 A.D. to the medieval period. Historians divide this period into the Ante-Nicene Period and the First seven Ecumenical Councils.

=== Ante-Nicene period ===
The Ante-Nicene Period (literally meaning "before Nicaea") of the history of early Christianity extended from the late 1st century to the early 4th century. Its end was marked by the First Council of Nicaea in 325 A.D. Christianity during this time was extremely diverse, with many developments that are difficult to trace and follow. There is also a relative paucity of available material, and this period is less studied than the preceding Apostolic Age and the historical ages following it. Nevertheless, this part of Christian history is important because it had a significant effect upon the development of Christianity.

=== First seven ecumenical councils ===
This era begins with the First Council of Nicaea, which enunciated the Nicene Creed that, in its original form and as modified by the First Council of Constantinople of 381 A.D., was seen as the touchstone of orthodoxy for the doctrine of the Trinity.

The first seven Ecumenical Councils, from the First Council of Nicaea (325 A.D. ) to the Second Council of Nicaea (787 A.D. ), represent an attempt to reach an orthodox consensus and to establish a unified Christendom.

The first scholar to study this time period as a whole was Philip Schaff, who wrote The Seven Ecumenical Councils of the Undivided Church, first published after his death in 1901. The topic is of particular interest to proponents of paleo-orthodoxy, who seek to recover the church as it was before the schisms.

=== Schools of Alexandria and Antioch ===
As early as the third century, Christian hermeneutics began to split into two primary schools: the Alexandrian and the Antiochene.

The Alexandrian biblical interpretations stressed allegorical readings, often at the expense of the texts' literal meaning. Origen and Clement of Alexandria were two major scholars in this school.

The Antiochene school stressed the literal and historical meaning of texts. Theodore of Mopsuestia and Diodore of Tarsus were the primary figures in this school.

== Medieval period ==
Medieval Christian biblical interpretations of text incorporated exegesis into a fourfold mode which emphasized the distinction between the letter and the spirit of the text. This schema was based on the various ways of interpreting text that were utilized by the patristic writers.

- The literal sense (sensus historicus) of scripture denotes what the text states or reports directly.
- The allegorical sense (sensus allegoricus) explains text in the light of the doctrinal content of church dogma, so that each literal element has a symbolic meaning (see also Typology (theology)).
- The moral application of a text to the individual reader or hearer is the third sense (the sensus tropologicus or sensus moralis).
- The fourth sense (sensus anagogicus) draws out of the text the implicit allusions it contains to secret metaphysical and eschatological knowledge, called gnosis.

Biblical hermeneutics in the Middle Ages witnessed the proliferation of nonliteral interpretations of the Bible. Christian commentators could read Old Testament narratives simultaneously:

- as prefigurations of analogous New Testament episodes,
- as symbolic lessons about church institutions and current teachings,
- and as personally applicable allegories of the Spirit.

In each case, the meaning of the narrative was constrained by imputing a particular intention to the Bible, such as teaching morality. But these interpretive bases were posited by the religious tradition rather than suggested by a preliminary reading of the text.

A similar fourfold mode is found in rabbinic writings. The four categories are:

- Peshat (simple interpretation)
- Remez (allusion)
- Derash (interpretive)
- Sod (secret or mystical)

It is uncertain whether the rabbinic categories of interpretation predate those of the patristic version. The medieval period saw the growth of many new categories of rabbinic interpretation and of exegesis of the Torah. Among these were the emergence of Kabbalah and the writings of Maimonides.

The hermeneutical terminology used here is in part arbitrary. For almost all three interpretations which go beyond the literal explanations are in a general sense "allegorical". The practical application of these three aspects of spiritual interpretation varied considerably. Most of the time, the fourfold sense of the Scriptures was used only partially, dependent upon the content of the text and the idea of the exegete.... We can easily notice that the basic structure is in fact a twofold sense of the Scriptures, that is, the distinction between the sensus literalis and the sensus spiritualis or mysticus, and that the number four was derived from a restrictive systematization of the numerous possibilities which existed for the sensus spiritualis into three interpretive dimensions.

The customary medieval exegetical technique commented on the text in glossae or annotations that were written between the lines or at the side of the text (which was left with wide margins for this purpose). The text might be further commented on in scholia, which are long, exegetical passages, often on a separate page.
