= Julius Ruska =

German orientalist, historian of science and educator

Julius Ferdinand Ruska (9 February 1867 in Bühl, Baden – 11 February 1949 in Schramberg) was a German orientalist, historian of science and educator.

He was a critical scholar of alchemical literature, and of Islamic science, raising many issues on attributions and sources of the texts, and providing translations. The range of his studies was wide, including the Emerald Tablet, a basic hermetic text. From 1924 he headed an institute in Heidelberg, where he has been a student.

Of his seven children, Ernst Ruska and Helmut Ruska were distinguished in their fields.

== Books ==
- Studien zur Geschichte der Chemie Festgabe (in German). Springer, 1927, 242 Pages. 1927. ISBN 3642512364.

== Sources ==
- Kraus, Paul (1938). Julius Ruska. Osiris. Vol. 5, pt. 1. Bruges: Saint Catherine Press. OCLC 29091796.
- Winderlich, Rudolf [in German] (1936). "Ruska's researches on the alchemy of al-Razi". Journal of Chemical Education. 13 (7): 313–315. Bibcode:1936JChEd..13..313W. doi:10.1021/ed013p313.
