= Pierre Lory =

French islamologist

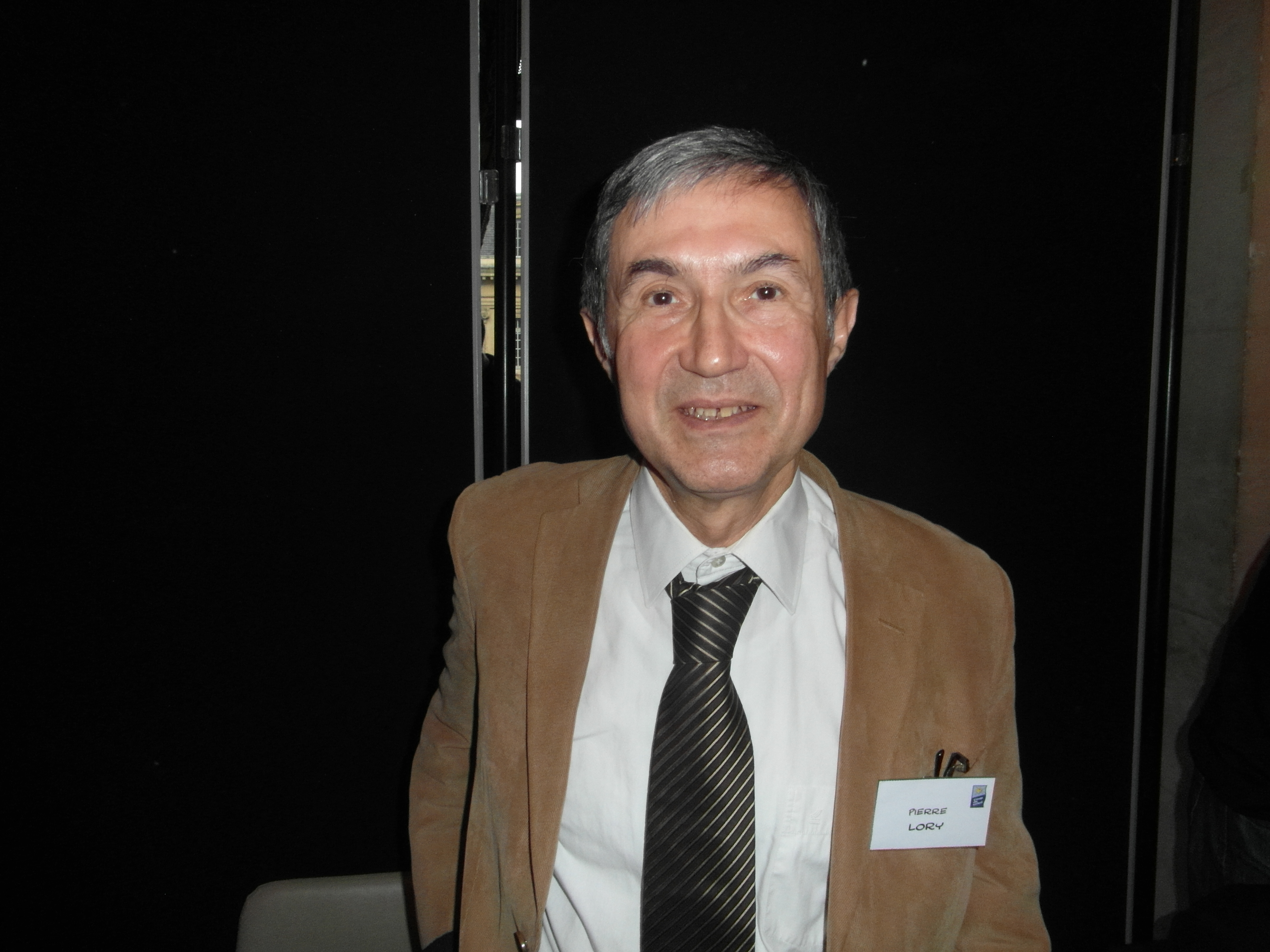
Pierre Lory, 2016

Pierre Lory (22 April 1952, Paris) is director of studies emeritus at the École Pratique des Hautes Études, and a former holder of the chair of Islamic mysticism.

== Publications ==
=== Works by Pierre Lory ===
- Les commentaires ésotériques du Coran selon ‘Abd al-Razzâq al-Qâshânî, Paris, Les Deux Océans, 1980, revised and extended in 1991, 123 pages. ISBN 2361120070, 978-2361120078 Translation into Turkish by Sadık Kılıc, Kaşânî’ye Göre Kur’an’ın Tasavvufi Tefsiri, Istanbul, Insan yayınları, 2001. Translation into Persian by Zaynab Poudineh Aqaï, Ta’wîlât al-Qur’ân az dîdgâh-e ‘Abd al-Razzâq-e Kâshânî, Téhéran, Enteshârât-e Hekmat, 2004.
- Dix traités d’alchimie de Jâbir ibn Hayyân - Les dix premiers Traités du Livre des Soixante-dix (texts translated and presented), Paris, Sindbad, 1983, reissued with an update in 1996, éditions Actes-Sud, 313 pages. ISBN 2727400896, 978-2727400899
- L’élaboration de l’Elixir Suprême - Quatorze traités de Jâbir ibn Hayyân sur le Grand Œuvre alchimique (in Arabic Tadbîr al-iksîr al-a‘zam; texts édited and presented), Damas, Publications of the Institut Français d’Études Arabes, 1988.
- Alchimie et mystique en terre d’Islam, Lagrasse, Verdier, Collection "Islam spirituel", 1989. Reprinted by éditions Gallimard, folio/essais, 2003, 246 pages. ISBN 2070427196, 978-2070427192 Translated into Spanish by Gracia Lopez Anguita, Alquimia y mística en el Islam, Madrid, Mandala Ediciones, 2005; into persian by Zeinab Pudineh Aqai et Reza Kuhkan, Kîmyâ-o ‘erfân dar sarzamîn-e Eslâm, Enteshârât-e Tahûrî, 2009.
- Le rêve et ses interprétations en Islam, Paris, Albin Michel, collection "Science des religions", 2003, 320 pages. ISBN 2226142320, 978-2226142320 Translation into Arabic Ta‘bîr al-ru’yâ fî al-Islâm, by Dalyâ al-Tûkhî, Cairo, al-Hay’a al-Misryya al-‘Âmma li-al-Kitâb, 2007.
- La science des lettres en islam, Paris, Dervy, Esprit de Lettre, 2004, 146 pages. ISBN 2844543219, 978-2844543219 Translation into Arabic by Dâliâ al-Tûkhî, ʿilm al-Ḥurouf fî al-Islâm, Cairo, Al-hay’a al-misriyya al-‘âmma li-al-kitâb, 2006.
- Petite histoire de l’islam, with Mohammad Ali Amir-Moezzi, Flammarion, Librio, 2007, 94 pages. ISBN 2290002410, 978-2290002414 Reprinted by the Nouvel Observateur in 2008.
- Min ta’rîkh al-hirmisiyya wa-al-sûfiyya fî al-Islâm (De l’histoire de l’hermétisme et du soufisme en Islam), translated by Lwiis Saliba, Byblos, Éditions Byblion, 2005; 2e édition revised and extended, 2008.

=== Works in collaboration ===
- Chapters on Les musulmans et les autres; chrétiens; juifs and La mystique in Les Arabes : Du message à l’histoire, under the direction of Dominique Chevallier and André Miquel, with articles by Mohamed El Aziz Ben Achour, Pierre Lory and Haim Zafrani, 650 pages, Fayard (1995). ISBN 2213593302, 978-2213593302
- See the long list of works in collaboration on page professionnelle de Pierre Lory.

=== Articles by Pierre Lory in encyclopedias and dictionaries ===
- Articles "Sarrâdj", "Shâdhilî", "Shâdhiliyya", "Shahrazûrî", "Tarîka (Afrique du Nord)"; "Walî (Afrique du Nord)", "Wukûf", "Muhammad b. Ahmad al-Hudîgî" (with M.Zekri, S. 7), "Tayyibiyya" (with A.Toufiq, S. 11-12) in Encyclopédie de l’Islam 2e éd., Leiden, Brill.
- Coordination du secteur "Islam" of the Dictionnaire critique de l’ésotérisme, Presses Universitaires de France, 1998, and writing of the articles "Alchimie", "Bastâmî", "orsî", "Danse", "Hallâj", "Ibn Masarra", "Islam", "Jâbir ibn Hayyân", "Magie", "Sabtî" in this volume.
- Articles "Jâbir ibn Hayyân" and "Râzî (Abû Bakr al-)" in Encyclopédie Philosophique Universelle - Les œuvres philosophiques', Presses Universitaires de France, 1992.
- "Hermetik – Hermetica / Islam", in Religion in Geschichte und Gegenwart – 4th completely revised edition, edited by H. D. Betz, D. S. Browning, B. Janowski and E. Jüngel, Mohr Siebeck, Tübingen, 2000.
- "Hermetic Literature III : Arab", in Dictionary of Gnosis and Western Esotericism, W. J. Hanegraaf, A.Faivre, R. van den Broek and J.-P. Brach éds, Leiden, Brill, 2005.
- Article "Jâber ebn-e Hayyân in Dâneshnâme-ye jahân-e Eslâm (Encyclopaedia of the World of Islam), vol. 9, Téhéran, Encyclopaedia Islamica Foundation 2005.
- Articles "Aaron", "Abraham", "David", "Elie", "Exégèse mystique" (with D.Gril), "Ezéchiel", "Folie", "‘Imrân et sa famille"", "Isaac et Ismaël", "Jean-Baptiste", "Josué", "Judas Iscariote", "Madian", "Magie", "Martyre", "Moïsz", "Nemrod"", "Occident et Coran", "Pèlerinage à La Mecque", "Poésie", "Qârûn", "Rêves", "Sciences occultes", "Zacharie" in the Dictionnaire du Coran, ss. dir. M. A. Amir-Moezzi, Laffont, 2007.
- Article "‘Abd al-Razzâq al-Kâshânî", "'Abd al-'Azîz al-Dabbâgh" in The Encyclopaedia of Islam, 3rd edition, 2009, Leiden, Brill.

== See also ==
- Alchemy and chemistry in medieval Islam
- Islamic eschatology
