= Islamic contributions =

Islamic contributions may refer to:

- Islamic Golden Age
- Islamic contributions to Medieval Europe
- Zakaat, Islamic alms-giving
