= Reception of Islam in early modern Europe =

European–Islamic cultural contact

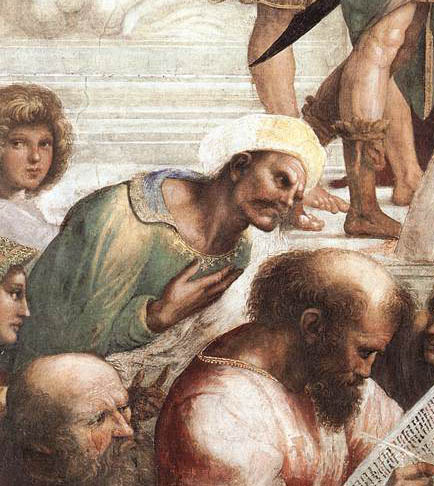
The Muslim polymath Averroes looking over the shoulder of Pythagoras in The School of Athens by Raphael, a symbolic Renaissance exaltation of the sum of knowledge.

There was cultural contact between Europe and the Islamic world (at the time primarily represented by the Ottoman Empire and, geographically more remote, Safavid Persia) from the Renaissance to early modern period.

Much of Europe's contact with the Islamic world was through various wars opposing the expansion of the Ottoman Empire.

There was limited direct interaction between the two cultures even though there was substantial trade between Europe and the Middle East at this time: merchants would often use intermediaries, a practice that had been common since the time of the Roman Empire. Historians have noted that even during the 12th and 14th centuries the two parties had little interest in learning about each other.

The history of the Ottoman Empire is intimately connected to the history of Renaissance and early modern Europe. The European Renaissance was significantly triggered by the Fall of Constantinople in 1453 (resulting in a wave of Byzantine scholars fleeing to Italy). The Ottoman Empire reached its peak in 1566, coinciding with the beginning of the Scientific Revolution in Europe, which would lead to the political dominance of Europe over the course of the following century.

== Iberian Peninsula ==
The kingdom of Granada was the last stronghold of Al-Andalus, which was for centuries a pinnacle of culture in the Islamic world. Trade from Granada included silk, ceramic, and porcelain. From 1230 until its fall to the Christians, the city was under the rule of the Nasrid dynasty. Ferdinand III of Castile had conquered almost all Andalusia by 1251. It was not until after the 1469 marriage between Prince Ferdinand II of Aragon and Isabella I of Castile that Alhambra, the Nasrid palace of Granada, fell to Spanish forces. Alhambra fell to the combined forces of Isabella and Ferdinand on January 2, 1492.

Alhambra was known as one of the greatest achievements of urban art in the Muslim world during the time of the Nasrids. The Court of the Myrtles and the Court of the Lions are the only two portions of the palace to survive to present time.

While the Treaty of Granada (1491) allowed the new subjects to keep practicing Islam, soon forced conversion was applied. The Granada Moors joined the earlier Iberian Moriscos. Some of them were Crypto-Muslims while others adhered sincerely to Christianity. Part of the former Granada nobility tried an intermediate way issuing the Lead Books of Sacromonte, purported paleo-Christian documents establishing a view of Christianity more acceptable to former Muslims. However, the Christianity of Moriscos and their fidelity to the Spanish kingdoms was doubted. The rules of cleanliness of blood treated them as second-class subjects. The battles of Spain and Portugal against Barbary pirates and the Ottoman Empire inspired fear of a fifth column, resolving Philip III of Spain to expel the Moriscos in 1609. Even useful refugees like deposed prince Muley Xeque had to leave some years later.

== Reception of Islam in Early Modern England ==
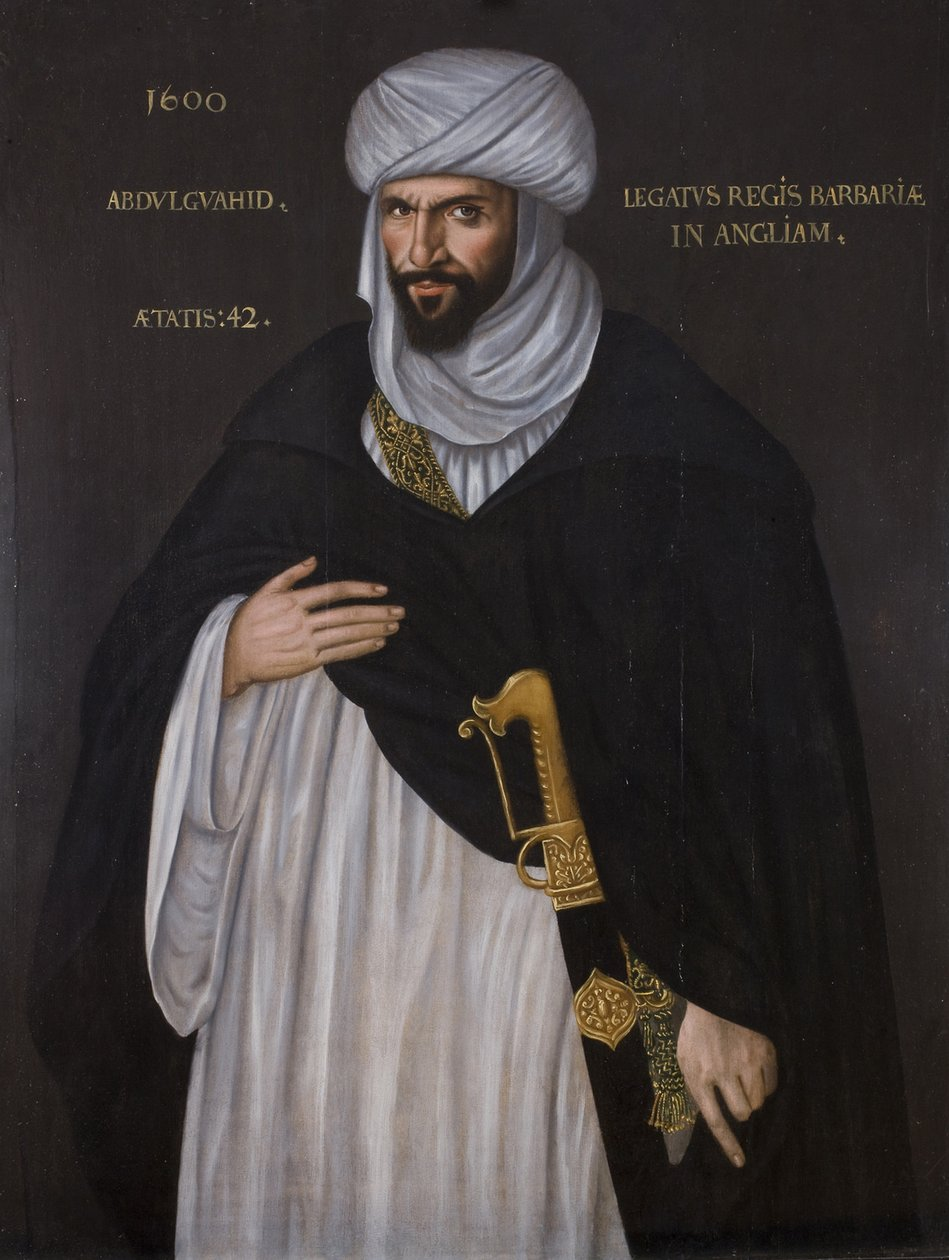
Portrait of Abd el-Ouahed ben Messaoud, a Moorish ambassador to Queen Elizabeth I in 1600

The first English convert to Islam mentioned by name is John Nelson. 16th century writer Richard Hakluyt claimed he was forced to convert, though he mentions in the same story other Englishmen who had converted willingly.

This king had a son which was a ruler in an island called Gerbi, whereunto arrived an English ship called the Green Dragon, of the which was master one M. Blonket, who, having a very unhappy boy on that ship, and understanding that whosoever would turn Turk should be well entertained of the a yeoman of our Queen's guard, whom the king's son had enforced to turn Turk; his name was John Nelson.

Captain John Ward of Kent was one of a number of British sailors who became pirates based in the Maghreb who also converted to Islam (see also Barbary pirates). Later, some Unitarians became interested in the faith, and Henry Stubbe wrote so favourably about Islam that it is thought he too had converted to the faith.

From 1609 to 1616, England lost 466 ships to Barbary pirates, who sold the passengers into slavery in North Africa. In 1625, it was reported that Lundy, an island in the Bristol Channel which had been a pirate lair for much of the previous half century, had been occupied by three Ottoman pirates who were threatening to burn Ilfracombe; Algerine rovers were using the island as a base in 1635, although the island had itself been attacked and plundered by a Spanish raid in 1633. In 1627, Barbary pirates under command of the Dutch renegade Jan Janszoon operating from the Moroccan port of Salé occupied Lundy. During this time there were reports of captured slaves being sent to Algiers and of the Islamic flag flying over Lundy.

== Ottoman presence in the Balkans ==
The Ottoman Empire emerged in 1299 and lasted until 1919. The Ottomans were strong proponents of Sunni Islam. In the 13th century, the kingdom was only in a small portion of northwest Anatolia but by the 16th century, it expanded to the heartland of the Byzantine Empire and its capital, Constantinople. The height of the Ottoman Empire occurred under the sultans Selim the Grim, also known as Selim I (1512–1520) and Suleyman the Magnificent (1520–1566). Under their reigns, the Turks conquered Egypt, Syria, and the North coast of Africa, the Red Sea, the island of Rhodes, and the Balkans all the way to the Great Hungarian Plain.

Many members of Kosovo's higher class, such as the Serbs and the Vlachs, converted to Islam during the Dušan period (1331–1355). A large part of the reason for the conversion was probably economic and social, as Muslims had considerably more rights and privileges than Christian subjects. As a result, Kosovo’s three largest towns were majority Muslim by 1485, where Christians had once formed a dense population before the rise of the Ottoman Empire. The movement was effective due to the wandering of Sufis who traveled around the region teaching religion as they went. By the 16th century, towns like Prizren, Skopje, and Đakovica had established centers of learning that became crucial in inspiring and educating scholars who would then use their knowledge to benefit the Ottoman Empire and the Muslim world. From this time onward, a number of books circulated in the region that had a Persian influence while written in the Albanian language and Arabic alphabet. The oldest genre in this style is known as Bejtexhinji poetry.

== Slavery ==
Slavery at the time of the European Renaissance was a socio-economic factor especially around the Mediterranean Sea region. It was accepted and approved for both Muslims and Christians. Most slaves came from warfare, privateering, or the international slave trade. Only some of the Arabian slaves in Europe were Muslims by origin. Many of the Muslim slaves were baptized before they were sold for the first time and then were given a new Christian name. There were, however, some Muslims who were not baptized and who kept their original names, but if they had children the newborns were immediately baptized. Most Muslim slaves converted to Christianity because there was hard social pressure at the time for them to convert. They also improved their social position by converting to Christianity, such as they would rise from a slave to a serf.

There were a small percentage of learned Muslim captives who were among the intellectual elite in their original hometowns among the Muslim prisoners and slaves. Captured Muslim scientists, physicians, and copyists were in high demand at slave markets. Learned Muslim captives were held in high regard by the authorities and they were sold for very high prices. They were wanted for the knowledge and advancements the Arabs had made over the Europeans. Copyists of Arabic manuscripts were needed in Spain to translate Arabic texts for the practice of medicine, the study of Arabic philosophy, and because of the popular interest in Europe for the translations of Arabic scientific texts. Learned Muslim captives played a very important role in the spread of Arabic science and philosophy over the Christian world.

The liberation of Muslim slaves was a state affair and elevated the popular esteem of the sovereign government. Muslim slaves were either freed or exchanged through special legislation and international treaties.

=== Examples of learned Muslim captives ===
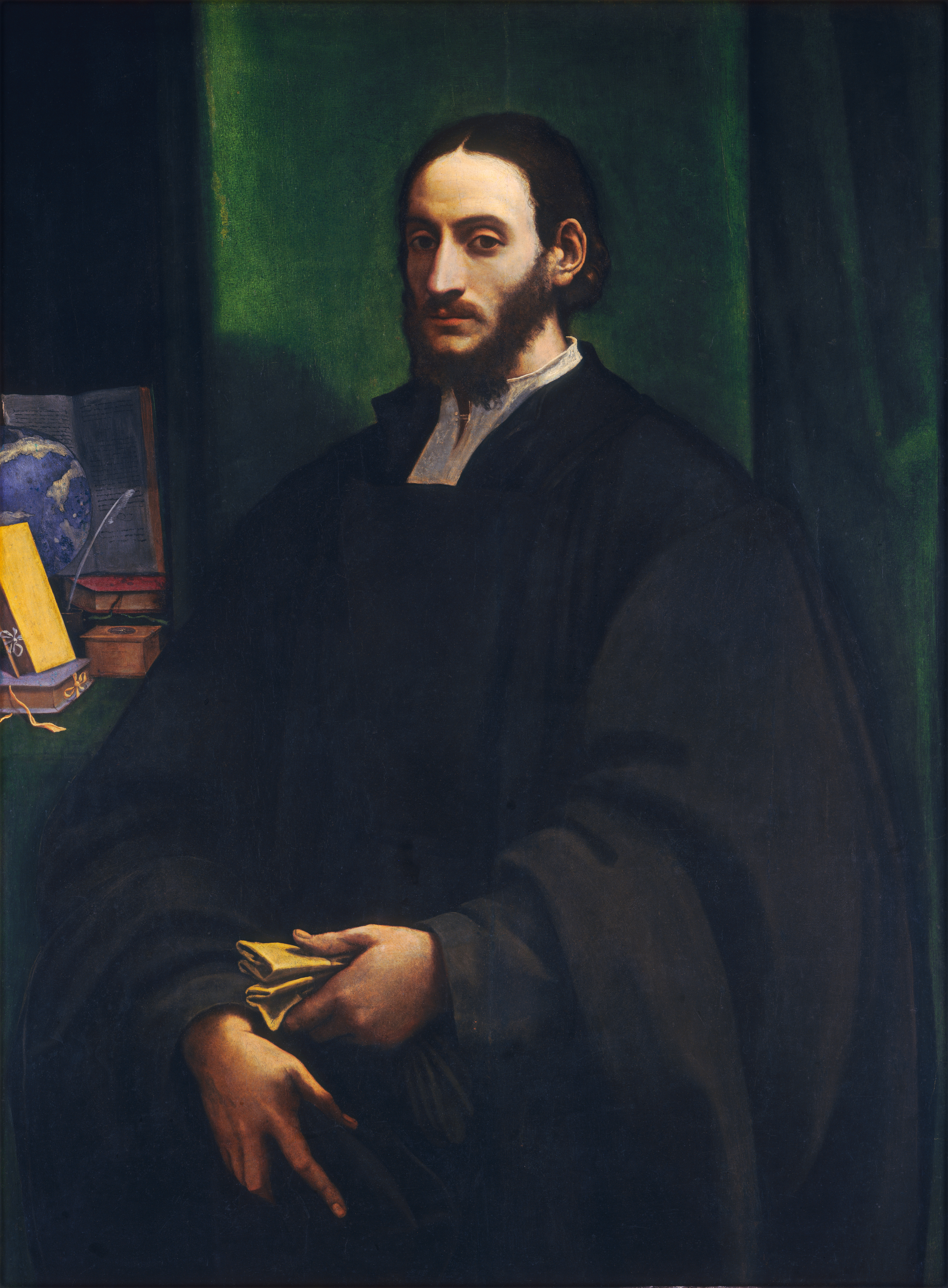
Portrait assumed to be of Leo Africanus (Sebastiano del Piombo, around 1520)

One account of a highly esteemed Muslim slave is of Moroccan geographer al-Hassan al-Wazzan al-Fasi, who made important contributions to geography and Italian texts. In 1519, al-Fasi was captured by a group of Sicilian pirates while he was on his way home from Egypt. When he was picked up he had scholarly notes on him that he had made from his travels through Africa. The pirates soon realized his value and they gave him to Pope Leo X in Rome. Al-Fasi was baptized on June 6, 1520, and renamed Joannis Leo, but he became known as Leo the African or Leo Africanus. Leo Africanus learned Italian, taught in Barcelona, and made Arabic notes in a book called Description of Africa, which was used for a number of years as an important source of geographic information on Muslim Africa.

=== Barbary pirates ===
The Barbary States, who were allies of the Ottoman Empire, sent Barbary pirates to raid parts of Western Europe in order to capture Christian slaves to sell at slave markets in the Arab World throughout the Renaissance period. Contemporaneous accounts suggest that a population of about 35,000 European slaves was maintained on the Barbary Coast. One writer estimates, on the basis that about 8,500 fresh slaves per annum would be required to maintain such a population, that as many as 1.25 million Europeans may have been taken in the 250 years to 1780, though there are no records to confirm such numbers. The slaves were captured mainly from seaside villages in Italy, Spain and Portugal, and from farther places like France or England, the Netherlands, Ireland and even Iceland and North America, ultimately provoking the First Barbary War of the newly-formed United States.

== Early Modern Orientalism ==
Following the first wave of Arabic interest during the Renaissance of the 12th century, which saw numerous Arabic texts being translated into Latin, there was a 'second wave' of interest in the study of Arabic literature, Arabic science and Islamic philosophy in 16th-century France and 17th-century England.

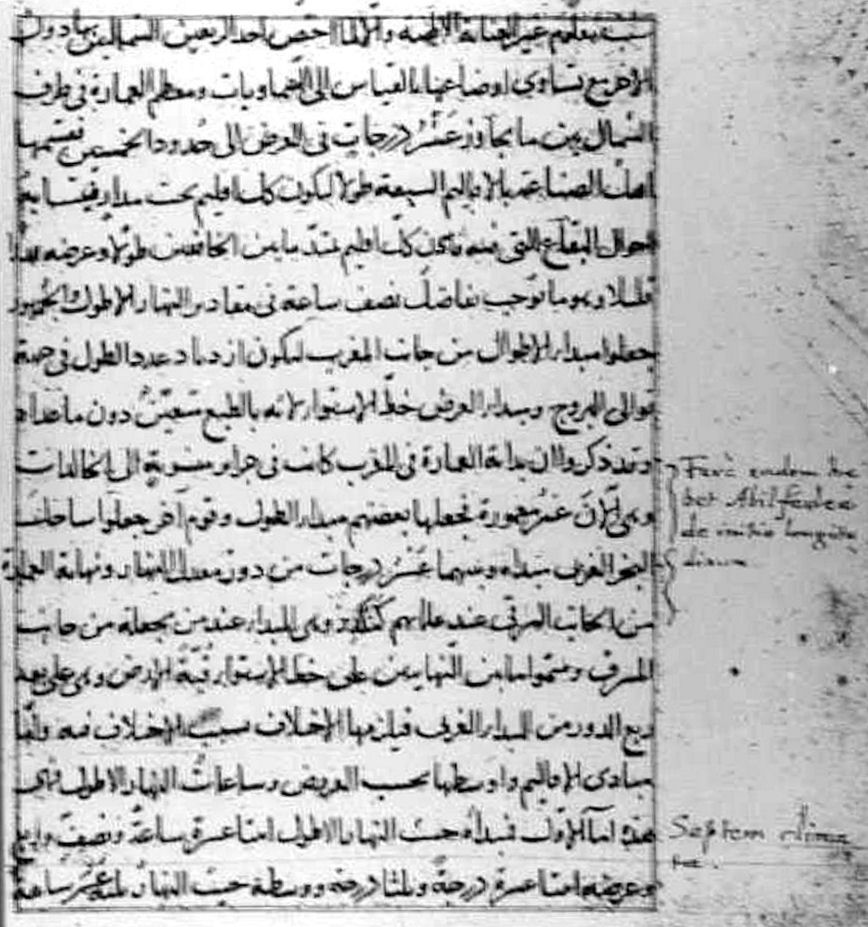
Arabic astronomical manuscript of Nasir al-Din al-Tusi, annotated by Guillaume Postel

Together with the development of the Franco-Ottoman alliance, cultural and scientific exchanges between France and the Ottoman Empire flourished. French scholars such as Guillaume Postel or Pierre Belon were able to travel to Asia Minor and the Middle East to collect information.

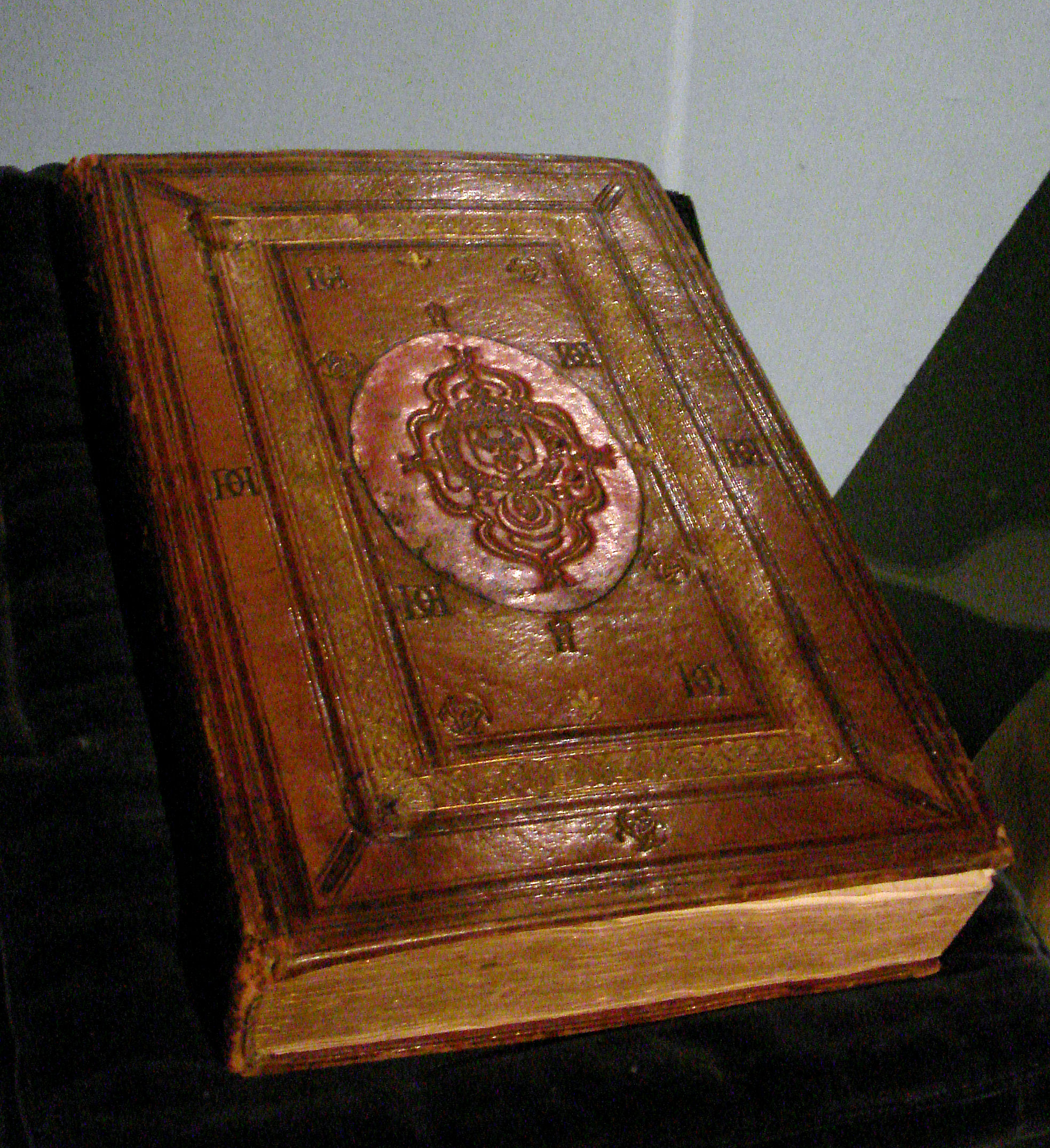
Ottoman Empire Coran, copied circa 1536, bound according to regulations set under Francis I circa 1549, with arms of Henri II. Bibliothèque Nationale de France.

Scientific exchange is thought to have occurred, as numerous works in Arabic, especially pertaining to astronomy were brought back, annotated and studied by scholars such as Guillaume Postel. Transmission of scientific knowledge, such as the Tusi-couple, may have occurred on such occasions, at the time when Copernicus was establishing his own astronomical theories.

Books, such as the Coran, were brought back to be integrated in Royal libraries, such as the Bibliothèque Royale de Fontainebleau, to create a foundation for the Collège des lecteurs royaux, future Collège de France. French novels and tragedies were written with the Ottoman Empire as a theme or background. In 1561, Gabriel Bounin published La Soltane, a tragedy highlighting the role of Roxelane in the 1553 execution of Mustapha, the elder son of Suleiman. This tragedy marks the first time the Ottomans were introduced on stage in France.

Arabic manuscripts were considered the key to a 'treasure house' of ancient knowledge, which led to the founding of Arabic Chairs at Oxford and Cambridge Universities, where Arabic was taught. A large collection of Arabic manuscripts were acquired, collected in places such as the Bodleian Library at Oxford. These Arabic manuscripts were sought after by natural philosophers for their research in subjects such as mathematics and observational astronomy, and also encompassed subjects ranging from science, religion, and medicine, to typography and garden plants.

Besides scientific and philosophical literature, works of Arabic fiction were also translated into Latin and English during the 17th and 18th centuries. The most famous one was the One Thousand and One Nights (Arabian Nights), which was first translated into English in 1706 and has since then had a profound influence on English literature. Another famous work was Ibn Tufail's philosophical novel Hayy ibn Yaqdhan, which was translated into Latin as Philosophus Autodidactus by Edward Pococke the Younger in 1671 and then into English by Simon Ockley in 1708. The English translation of Hayy ibn Yaqdhan, set on a desert island, may have inspired Daniel Defoe to write Robinson Crusoe, considered the first novel in English, in 1719. Later translated literary works include Layla and Majnun and Ibn al-Nafis' Theologus Autodidactus.

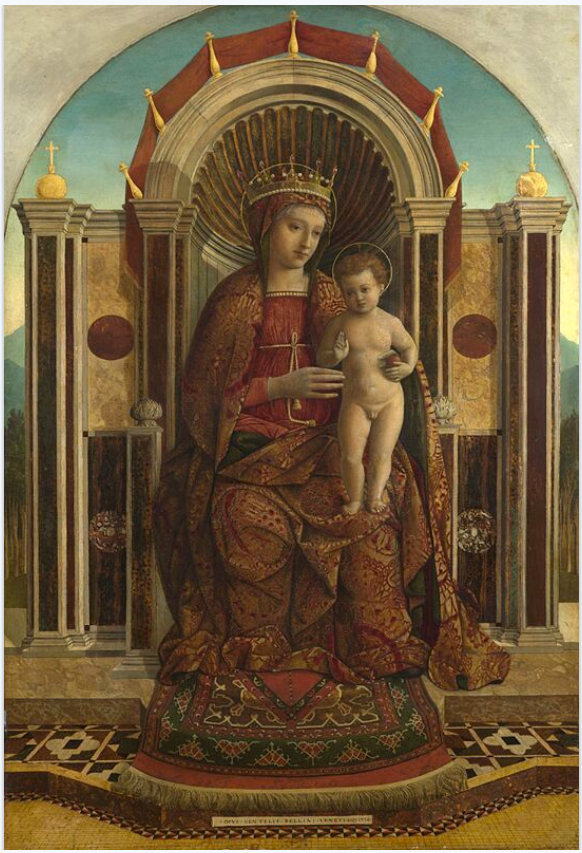
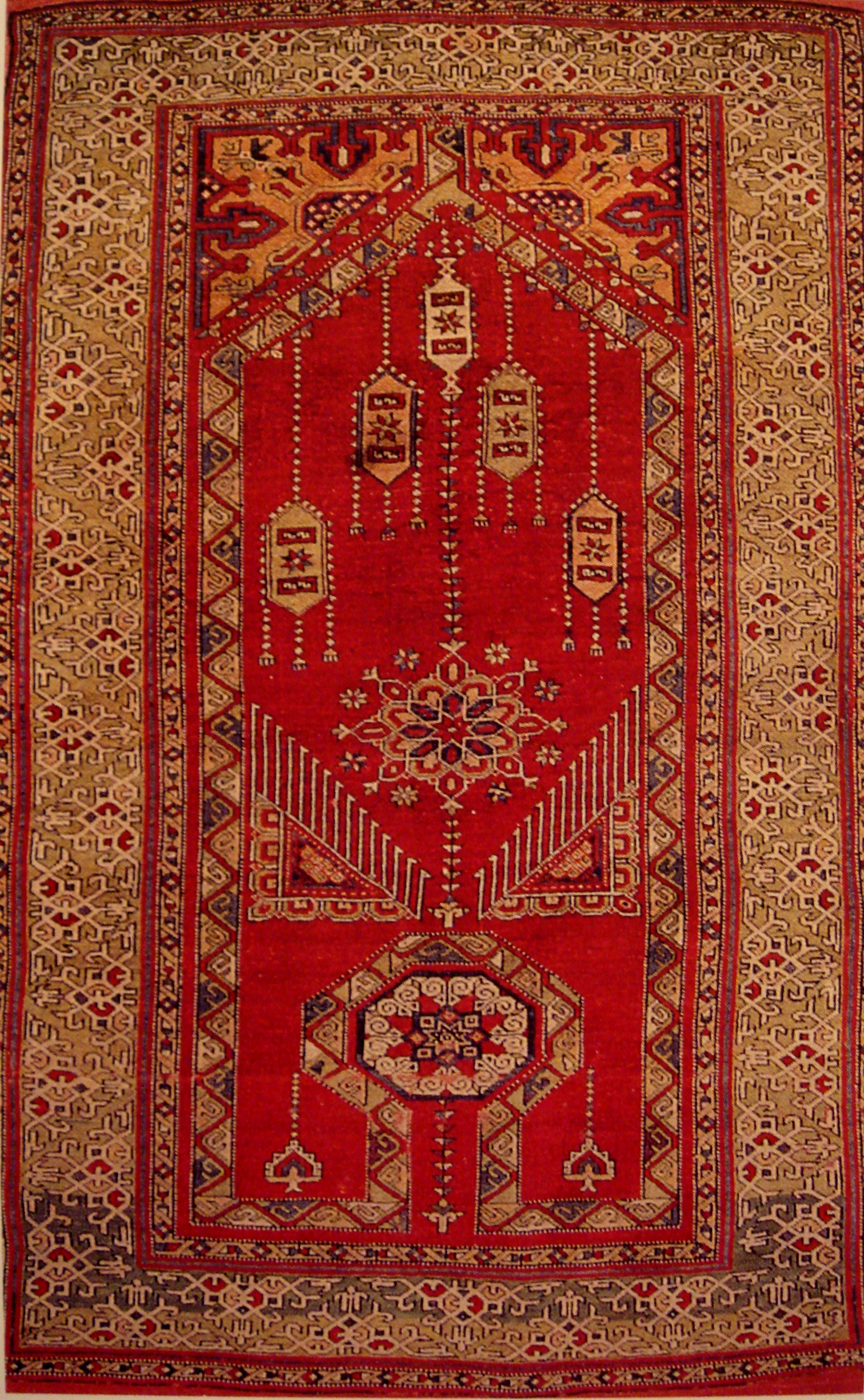
Left image: A "Bellini type" Islamic prayer rug, seen from the top, at the feet of the Virgin Mary, in Gentile Bellini's Madonna and Child Enthroned, late 15th century, an example of Oriental carpets in Renaissance painting.
Right image: Prayer rug, Anatolia, late 15th to early 16th century, with "re-entrant" keyhole motif.

The Muslim Moors had a noticeable influence on the works of George Peele and William Shakespeare. Some of their works featured Moorish characters, such as Peele's The Battle of Alcazar and Shakespeare's The Merchant of Venice, Titus Andronicus and Othello, which featured a Moorish Othello as its title character. These works are said to have been inspired by several Moorish delegations from Morocco to Elizabethan England around 1600. A portrait was painted of one of the Moorish ambassadors, Abd el-Ouahed ben Messaoud ben Mohammed Anoun, who had come to promote an Anglo-Moroccan alliance.

At the Bodleian Library of Oxford University, there were hundreds of Arabic manuscripts, as well as dozens of Persian and Turkish ones, available during the 17th century. These included works on Islamic law and Arabic grammar; the lexicography of Al-Firuzabadi and Al-Jawhari; works on Arabic poetry; the Indian literary work Kalila and Dimna; the proverbs of Al-Maydani and Maqama of Al-Hariri of Basra; the medical works of Al-Razi, Avicenna, Ibn al-Baitar, Hunayn ibn Ishaq, Al-Majusi, Ibn al-Jazzar, Abu al-Qasim al-Zahrawi, Ibn Zuhr, Maimonides and Ibn al-Nafis; the astronomical works of Ibn al-Banna, Ibn al-Shatir, Al-Farghani and Alhazen; the Masudic Canon by Abu Rayhan Biruni and the Book of Fixed Stars by Al-Sufi; several Ottoman scientific works by Taqi al-Din Muhammad ibn Ma'ruf; occult and alchemical works; the Secretum Secretorum; Al-Safadi's biographical dictionary Al-Sihah; the historical works of Al-Tabari, Al-Isfahani, Al-Makin, Ibn Khallikan, Al-Dhahabi, Al-Waqidi, Ibn al-Shina, Al-Utbi, Ibn al-Jawzi, Ibn al-Athir, Sibt ibn al-Jawzi, Ibn Abi Usaibia, Bar-Hebraeus, Al-Tunaynai, Ibn Duqmaq, Ibn Taghribirdi, Al-Suyuti, Al-Jannabi, Ibn Hayyan, Ibn Miskawayh, Ibn Hajar al-Asqalani and Al-Maqrizi; the History of Time by Al-Masudi and volume five of Ibn Khaldun's historiographical work Kitab al-Ibar; the historical and geographical works of Abu al-Fida; the Sahih al-Bukhari and Qur'anic commentaries; the Algebra by Al-Khwarizmi and the mathematical works of Nasir al-Din al-Tusi; the Encyclopedia of the Brethren of Purity and Avienna's The Book of Healing; the works of Ibn Bajjah and Ibn Tufail; geographical works of Ibn Khordadbeh and Ibn Hawqal; . A Latin translation of two of Ali Qushji's works, the Tract on Arithmetic and Tract on Astronomy, was published by John Greaves in 1650.

=== The turban in art and politics ===
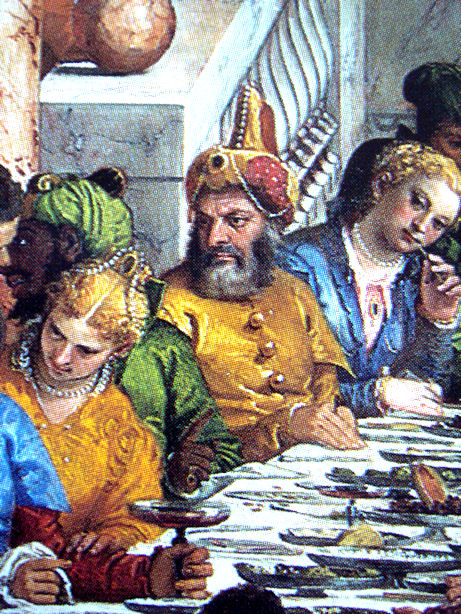
Suleiman the Magnificent appears at the table in the 1563 The Wedding at Cana by Paolo Veronese.

The turban often represented Muslims in the paintings of Italian and Flemish artists when they depicted scenes of the Ottoman Empire and Biblical lore. Famous figures such as Suleyman the Magnificent, Hagar, and Hayreddin Barbarossa appear in these paintings. The tradition of depicting Biblical characters in turbans has continued through to this century, as at least one of the wise men is always depicted with a turban.

Turban iconography was highly prominent, especially in Renaissance England. While friendly relations were formed between England and the Islamic civilization of the Middle East in the early 16th century, Turkish fashions became popular for the higher classes. During times of interaction with Istanbul, Queen Elizabeth I of England wore Turkish clothing styles. It was believed that she favored working with the Islamic sultans of Istanbul rather than the Roman Catholic leaders of Europe. These suspicions were heightened when she asked Sultan Murad III and his son Mohammad III for military assistance. Although she never did receive any assistance from the sultans, her relations with the Sultan and his son did not waver.

=== Views on Muslim women ===
Alexander Ross, a writer and controversialist living in the first half of the 17th century, praised the Turks for being "more modest in their conversation generally than we; Men and Women converse not together promiscuously, as among us." Ross believed that England could learn a great deal from the Muslims. During the Renaissance, English women disrespected their husbands because they were free to do what they wanted, which society believed led to a moral deterioration. European women also began leaving home to become male-like figures in society. Other European women attacked male chauvinism and defended the status of women by handing out pamphlets. Women rebelled against male religious hierarchy and began to replace men as preachers and pastors. Christian writers highly admired Muslim women because they were frugal compared to English women, they were respected by their husbands because they did not play "false" with them, and because Muslim women went immediately back to work after giving birth and they still had time to raise their children themselves, unlike English women.

The Muslim model became an example of the "exotic" and "Utopian" ideal because it was not possible in European society. European men sought to reinforce the traditional role of women and wanted their women to adhere to the model of Muslim women as frugal, obedient, wearing modest apparel, and respectful towards their husbands. Muslims and Englishmen differed in various ways, especially in their religious beliefs and militarism, but they did agree with each other on the representation of Muslim women.

== See also ==
- Islamic world contributions to Medieval Europe
- Medieval Christian views on Muhammad
