= Isaac ibn Sid =

Astronomer

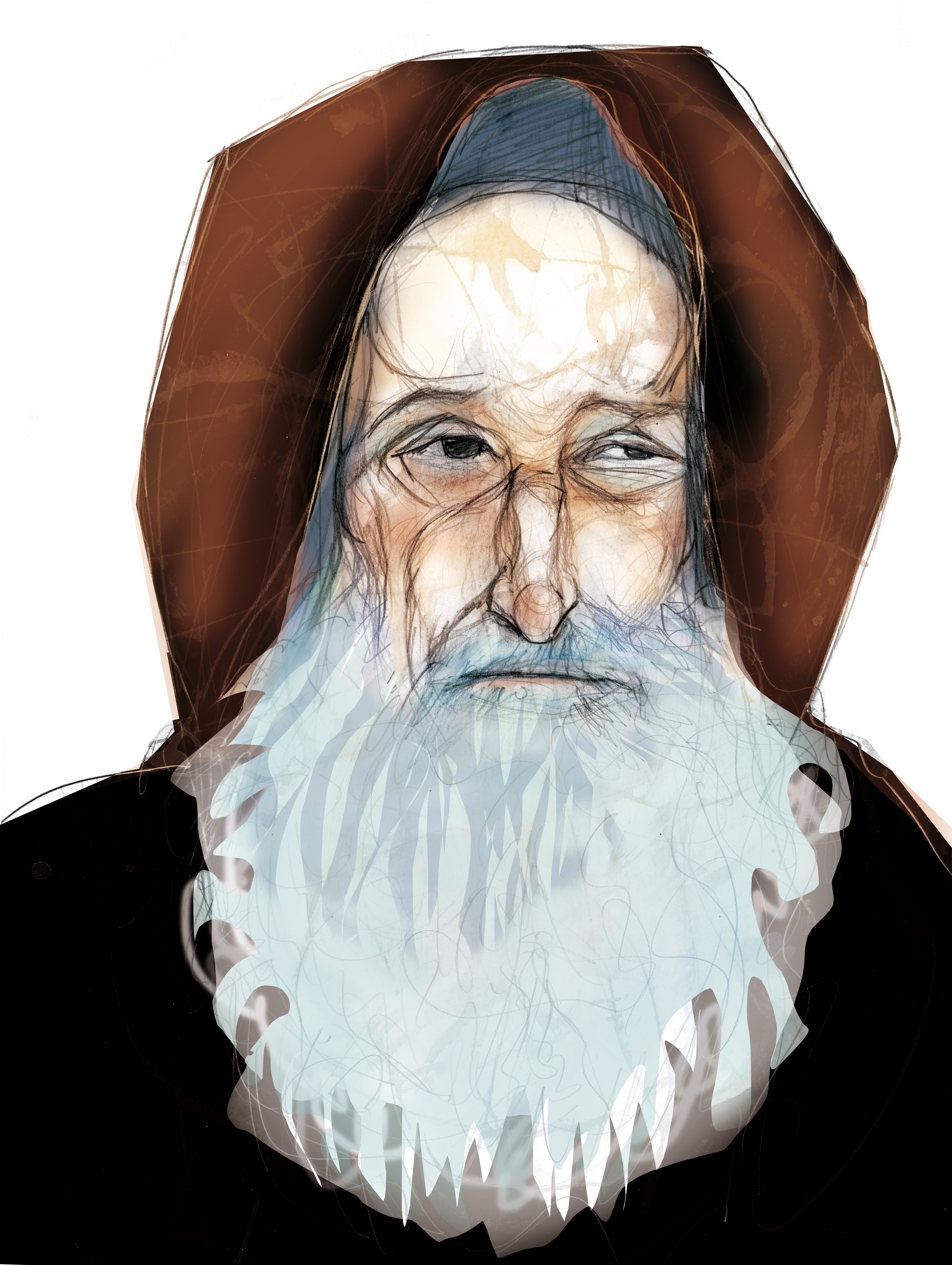
A portrait painting of Isaac Ben Sid

Isaac ibn Sid was a Spanish-Jewish astronomer who flourished at the Toledo School of Translators in the second half of the thirteenth century. He is also known as Ibn Sa'id, Aben Çayd, Rabbi Zag, or Rabbi Çag.

== Biography ==
Isaac ibn Sid took a leading part in the compilation of the Alfonsine Tables with Yehuda ben Moshe. Isaac Israeli (ib.) states that he saw recorded in Isaac ibn Sid's own handwriting three observations of moon eclipses made by him at the order of Alfonso. In official documents (De Castro, "Bibliotheca," i. 184b) Isaac ibn Sid is termed by Alfonso "our learned Rabbi Çag."

Zag de Sujurmenza was commissioned by the king to write Astrolabio redondo (spherical astrolabe), Astrolabio llano (flat astrolabe), Constelaciones (constellations) and Lámina Universal (an instrument that improved on the astrolabe). He translated the book Armellas de Ptolemy, and wrote about the Piedra de la sombra (stone of the shadow, or sundial), Relox de agua (clepsydra, or water clock) Argente vivo o azogue (quicksilver or mercury) and Candela (candle clock). Of his works, the most important are those of the "round astrolabe" and the "flat astrolabe". In the first, the author rises to profound scientific considerations that reveal the vast knowledge he possessed in sciences. It has been said that with this book, Zag Sujurmenza reformed the character of the science of astronomy and contributed to its advancement, without losing sight of the studies of Arab scholars, following in their footsteps and correcting their errors. Other works of Zag de Sujurmenza, if less extensive, are not without merit.

He wrote a treatise on clockmaking for Alfonso, in which he described a cross-shaped main wheel similar to the construction of the noria.

In 1277, Isaac translated from the Arabic a work on the quadrant. His name is connected with the invention of various instruments (De Castro, l.c. i. 144a, 156a, 157).

== See also ==
- Toledo School of Translators
- Literature of Alfonso X
- Book of knowledge of astrology
- History of sundials
- Libros del saber de astronomía [The Books of the Wisdom of Astronomy by King Alfonso X, the Learned]
