= Jonathan Joseph =

Jonathan Joseph may refer to:

- DJ Spoony (born 1970), stage name for British DJ Johnathan Joseph
- Johnathan Joseph (born 1984), American football player
- Jonathan Joseph (rugby union) (born 1991), English rugby union player

== See also ==
- Jonathan ben Joseph, Lithuanian rabbi and astronomer
