= Multiplication sign =

Mathematical symbol

×o

Multiplication sign
- In Unicode: U+00D7 × MULTIPLICATION SIGN (&times;)

Different from
- Different from: U+0078 x LATIN SMALL LETTER X

Related
- See also: U+22C5 ⋅ DOT OPERATOR; U+00F7 ÷ DIVISION SIGN

The multiplication sign (×), also known as the times sign or the dimension sign, is a mathematical symbol used to denote the operation of multiplication, which results in a product.

The symbol is also used in botany, in botanical hybrid names.

The form is properly a four-fold rotationally symmetric saltire. The multiplication sign × is similar to a lowercase X (x), to the point that the latter is commonly substituted.

== History ==
The earliest known use of the × symbol to indicate multiplication appears in an anonymous appendix to the 1618 edition of John Napier's Mirifici Logarithmorum Canonis Descriptio. This appendix has been attributed to William Oughtred, who used the same symbol in his 1631 algebra text, Clavis Mathematicae, stating:

Multiplication of species [i.e. unknowns] connects both proposed magnitudes with the symbol 'in' or ×: or ordinarily without the symbol if the magnitudes be denoted with one letter.

Other works have been identified in which crossed diagonals appear in diagrams involving multiplied numbers, such as Robert Recorde's The Ground of Arts (Note: The diagonals do not appear in the original 1543 edition, leaving their priority to Oughtred uncertain.) and Oswald Schreckenfuchs's 1551 edition of Almagest, but these are not symbolizations.

== Uses ==
In mathematics, the symbol × has a number of uses, including

- Multiplication of two numbers, where it is read as "times" or "multiplied by"
- Cross product of two vectors, where it is usually read as "cross"
- Cartesian product of two sets, where it is usually read as "cross"
- Geometric dimension of an object, such as noting that a room is 10 feet × 12 feet in area, where it is usually read as "by" (e.g., "10 feet by 12 feet")
- Display resolution in pixels, such as 1920 pixels across × 1080 pixels down. Read as "by".
- Dimensions of a matrix, where it is usually read as "by"
- A statistical interaction between two explanatory variables, where it is usually read as "by"
- the optical magnification is sometimes referred to as "power" (for example "10× power")

In biology, the multiplication sign is used in a botanical hybrid name, for instance Ceanothus papillosus × impressus (a hybrid between C. papillosus and C. impressus) or Crocosmia × crocosmiiflora (a hybrid between two other species of Crocosmia). However, the communication of these hybrid names with a Latin letter "x" is common, especially when the actual "×" symbol is not readily available.

The multiplication sign is also used by historians for an event between two dates. When employed between two dates – for example 1225 and 1232 – the expression "1225×1232" means "no earlier than 1225 and no later than 1232".

A monadic × symbol is used by the APL programming language to denote the sign function.

== Similar notations ==
The lower-case Latin letter x is sometimes used in place of the multiplication sign. This is considered incorrect in mathematical writing.

In algebraic notation, widely used in mathematics, a multiplication symbol is usually omitted wherever it would not cause confusion: "a multiplied by b" can be written as ab or a b.

Other symbols can also be used to denote multiplication, often to reduce confusion between the multiplication sign × and the common variable x. In some countries, such as Germany, the primary symbol for multiplication is the "dot operator" ⋅ (as in a⋅b). This symbol is also used in compound units of measurement, e.g., N⋅m (see International System of Units § Lexicographic conventions). In algebra, it is a notation to resolve ambiguity (for instance, "b times 2" may be written as b⋅2, to avoid being confused with a value called b_{2}). This notation is used wherever multiplication should be written explicitly, such as in "ab = a⋅2 for b = 2"; this usage is also seen in English-language texts. In some languages, the use of full stop as a multiplication symbol, such as a.b, is common when the symbol for the decimal point is a comma.

Historically, computer language syntax was restricted to the ASCII character set, and the asterisk * became the de facto symbol for the multiplication operator. This selection is reflected in the numeric keypad on English-language keyboards, where the arithmetic operations of addition, subtraction, multiplication and division are represented by the keys +, -, * and /, respectively.

== Unicode and HTML entities ==
- U+00D7 × MULTIPLICATION SIGN (&times;)

Other variants and related characters:

- U+002A * ASTERISK (&ast;, &midast;)
- U+2217 ∗ ASTERISK OPERATOR (&lowast;)
- U+2062 INVISIBLE TIMES (&InvisibleTimes;, &it;) (a zero-width space indicating multiplication; The invisible times codepoint is used in mathematical type-setting to indicate the multiplication of two terms without a visible multiplication operator, e.g. when type-setting 2x (the multiplication of the number 2 and the variable x), the invisible times codepoint can be inserted in-between: 2 <U+2062> x )
- U+00B7 · MIDDLE DOT (&middot;, &CenterDot;, &centerdot;) (the interpunct, may be easier to type than the dot operator)
- U+2297 ⊗ CIRCLED TIMES (&CircleTimes;, &otimes;)
- U+22C5 ⋅ DOT OPERATOR (&sdot;)
- U+2715 ✕ MULTIPLICATION X
- U+2716 ✖ HEAVY MULTIPLICATION X
- U+2A09 ⨉ N-ARY TIMES OPERATOR
- U+2A2F ⨯ VECTOR OR CROSS PRODUCT (&Cross;) (intended to explicitly denote the cross product of two vectors)
- U+2A30 ⨰ MULTIPLICATION SIGN WITH DOT ABOVE (&timesd;)
- U+2A31 ⨱ MULTIPLICATION SIGN WITH UNDERBAR (&timesbar;)
- U+2A34 ⨴ MULTIPLICATION SIGN IN LEFT HALF CIRCLE (&lotimes;)
- U+2A35 ⨵ MULTIPLICATION SIGN IN RIGHT HALF CIRCLE (&rotimes;)
- U+2A36 ⨶ CIRCLED MULTIPLICATION SIGN WITH CIRCUMFLEX ACCENT (&otimesas;)
- U+2A37 ⨷ MULTIPLICATION SIGN IN DOUBLE CIRCLE (&Otimes;)
- U+2A3B ⨻ MULTIPLICATION SIGN IN TRIANGLE (&tritime;)
- U+2AC1 ⫁ SUBSET WITH MULTIPLICATION SIGN BELOW (&submult;)
- U+2AC2 ⫂ SUPERSET WITH MULTIPLICATION SIGN BELOW (&supmult;)

== See also ==
- Division sign
- Order of operations § Mixed division and multiplication
- List of mathematical symbols
- Plus and minus signs
- Reference mark
- Unicode input – Input characters using their Unicode code points (a general guide to entering "off-keyboard" symbols).
- X mark – Symbol with multiple meanings
