= Jonathan ben Joseph =

Jonathan ben Joseph was a Lithuanian rabbi and astronomer who lived in Risenoi, Grodno, in the late 17th century and early 18th century. Jonathan studied astronomy and mathematics.

In 1710, Jonathan and his family lived a year in the fields due to a plague at Risenoi. He vowed that, on surviving, he would spread astronomical knowledge among his fellow believers. After he became blind, he went to Germany, where the bibliographer Wolf met him in 1725. Jonathan authored two astronomical commentaries: the Yeshu'ah be-Yisrael, on Maimonides' neomenia laws (Frankfort-on-the-Main, 1720); and Bi'ur, on Abraham ben Ḥiyya's Ẓurat ha-Areẓ (Offenbach, 1720).

He explains in the introduction that he had no formal teacher and learned from the rabbinic books available to him, and apologizes for his limited background in mathematics and the sciences. However, he cites a Jewish historical connection to astronomy and the natural sciences.

Jonathan created a plan of the Temple as described in tractate Middot, which was printed in the 1720 volume of the Talmud in Frankfurt on the Main. This plan was copied in almost all subsequent printings of the Talmud.
