= Toledo School of Translators =

Group of scholars

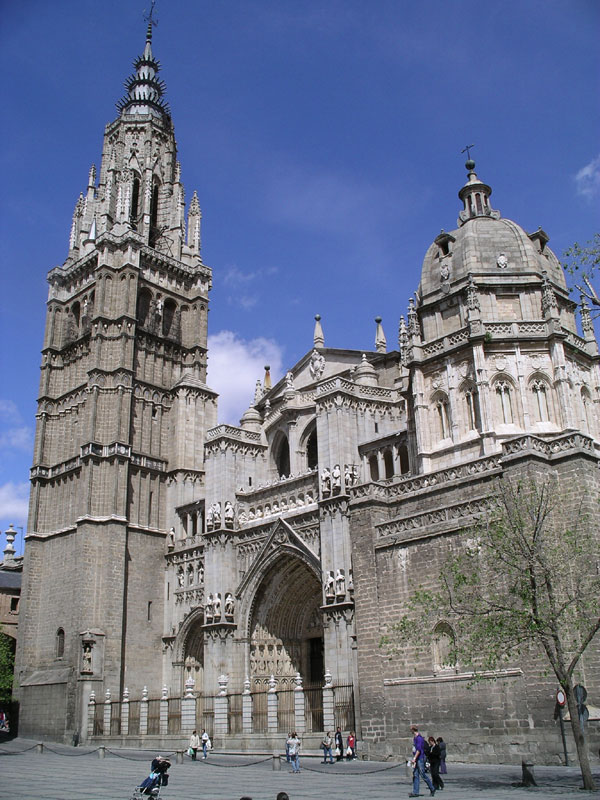
The Cathedral of Toledo became a translation center in the 12th century.

The Toledo School of Translators (Spanish: Escuela de Traductores de Toledo) is the group of scholars who worked together in the city of Toledo during the 12th and 13th centuries, to translate many of the Islamic philosophical and scientific works from Classical Arabic into Medieval Latin.

The School went through two distinct periods separated by a transitional phase. The first was led by Archbishop Raymond of Toledo in the 12th century, who promoted the translation of philosophical and religious works, mainly from classical Arabic into medieval Latin. Under King Alfonso X of Castile during the 13th century, the translators no longer worked with Latin as the final language, but translated into Old Spanish. This resulted in establishing the foundations of a first standard of the Spanish language, which eventually developed two varieties, one from Toledo and one from Seville.

== History ==
=== Background ===
Traditionally Toledo was a center of multilingual culture and had prior importance as a centre of learning and translation, beginning in its era under Muslim rule. Numerous classical works of ancient philosophers and scientists that had been translated into Arabic during the Islamic Golden Age "back east" were well known in Al-Andalus, such as those from the Neoplatonism school, Aristotle, Hippocrates, Galen, Ptolemy, etc., as well as the works of ancient philosophers and scientists from Persia, India, and China; these enabled Arabic-speaking populations at the time (both in the east and in "the west," or North Africa and the Iberian peninsula) to learn about many ancient classical disciplines that were generally inaccessible to the Christian parts of western Europe, and Arabic-speaking scientists in the eastern Muslim lands such as Ibn Sina, al-Kindi, al-Razi, and others had added significant works to that ancient body of thought.

Some of the Arabic literature was also translated into Latin, Hebrew, and Ladino, such as that of Jewish philosopher Moses Maimonides, Muslim sociologist-historian Ibn Khaldun, Carthage citizen Constantine the African, or the Persian Al-Khwarizmi.

Al-Andalus's multi-cultural richness beginning in the era of Umayyad dynasty rule in that land (711-1031) was one of the main reasons why European scholars were traveling to study there as early as the end of the 10th century. As the Arabic-speaking rulers who initially came in 711 intermingled and intermarried with local populations, the co-existence of Arabic, Hebrew, Latin, and the local Romance vernacular had seen the emergence of new pidgin vernaculars and bilingual song forms, as well as the creation of new bodies of literature in Arabic and Hebrew. The environment bred multi-lingualism. This era saw the development of a large community of Arabic-speaking Christians (known as Mozarabs) who were available to work on translations. But translating efforts were not methodically organized until Toledo was reconquered by Christian forces in 1085. The new rulers inherited vast libraries containing some of the leading scientific and philosophical thought not only of the ancient world, but of the Islamic east, the cutting edge of scientific discourse of the era—and it was all largely in Arabic.

Another reason for Al-Andalus's importance at the time is that some Christian leaders in certain other parts of Europe considered a few scientific and theological subjects studied by the ancients, and further advanced by the Arabic-speaking scientists and philosophers, to be heretical. The Condemnations of 1210–1277 at the medieval University of Paris, for example, were enacted to restrict the teachings of several theological works, among which were the physical treatises of Aristotle and the works of Averroes (the Latinized name of the Muslim philosopher-physician of al-Andalus, Ibn Rushd).

=== Beginnings ===
Raymond of Toledo, Archbishop of Toledo from 1126 to 1151, started the first translation efforts at the library of the Cathedral of Toledo, where he led a team of translators who included Mozarabic Toledans, Jewish scholars, Madrasah teachers, and monks from the Order of Cluny. They translated many works, usually from Arabic, Hebrew and Greek into Latin. The work of these scholars made available very important texts from Arabic and Hebrew philosophers, whom the Archbishop deemed important for an understanding of several classical authors, specially Aristotle. As a result, the library of the cathedral, which had been refitted under Raymond's orders, became a translations center of a scale and importance not matched in the history of western culture.

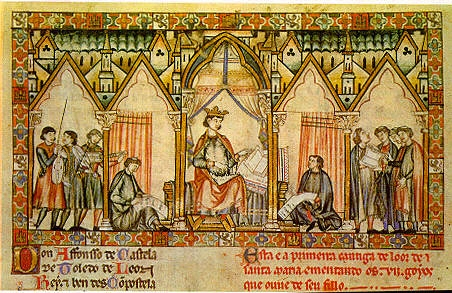
Alfonso X of Castile, The Wise, dictating the Cantigas de Santa Maria .

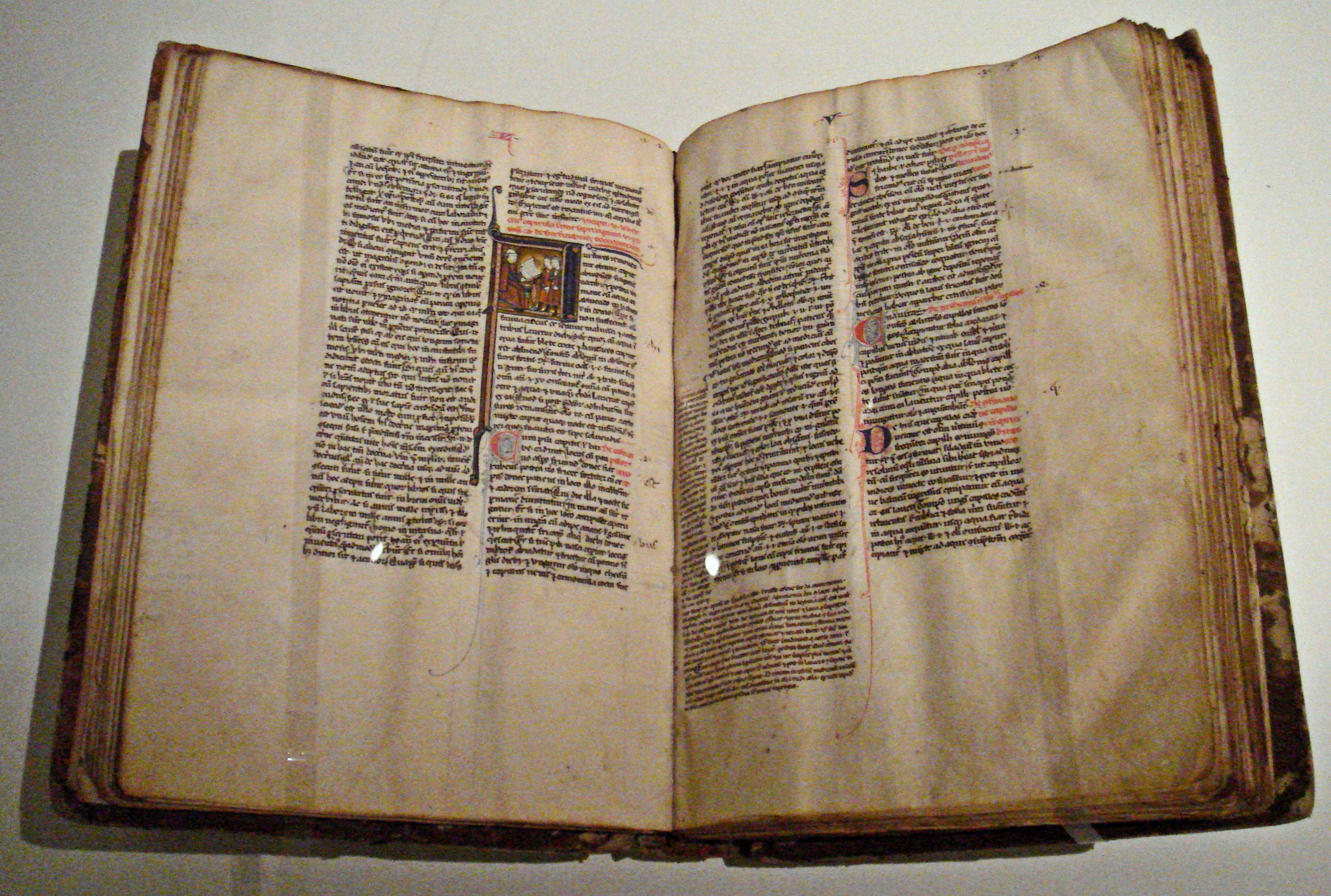
Al-Razi's Recueil des traités de médecine translated by Gerard of Cremona, second half of the 13th century

Gerard of Cremona was the most productive of the Toledo translators at the time, translating more than 87 books in Arabic science. He came to Toledo in 1167 in search of Ptolemy's Almagest. Since he did not know Arabic when he arrived, he relied on Jews and Mozarabs for translation and teaching.

His translated books include the following:

- Ptolemy's Almagest;
- Aristotle's Posterior Analytics, Physics, On the Heavens and the World, On Generation and Corruption, and Meteorology, Nicomachean Ethics;
- al-Khwarizmi's On Algebra and Almucabala.
- Archimedes' On the Measurement of the Circle;
- Euclid's Elements of Geometry,
- Jabir ibn Aflah's Elementa astronomica,
- Al-Kindi's On Optics,
- al-Farghani's On Elements of Astronomy on the Celestial Motions,
- al-Farabi's On the Classification of the Sciences,
- al-Razi (Rhazes) chemical and medical works, and
- Thabit ibn Qurra and Hunayn ibn Ishaq.

He edited for Latin readers the "Toledan Tables", the most accurate compilation of astronomical/astrological data (ephemeris) ever seen in Europe at the time, which were partly based on the work of al-Zarqali and the works of Jabir ibn Aflah, the Banu Musa brothers, Abu Kamil, Abu al-Qasim, and Ibn al-Haytham (including the Book of Optics).

Other medical works which he translated include the following:

- Haly Abenrudian's Expositio ad Tegni Galeni;
- Yuhanna ibn Sarabiyun (Serapion) Practica, Brevarium medicine;
- Alkindus' De Gradibus;
- Rhazes' Liber ad Almansorem, Liber divisionum, Introductio in medicinam, De egritudinibus iuncturarum, Antidotarium and Practica puerorum;
- Isaac Israeli ben Solomon, De elementis and De definitionibus;
- Abulcasis, Al-Tasrif as Chirurgia;
- Avicenna, The Canon of Medicine as Liber Canonis; and
- Ibn Wafid (Abenguefit), the Liber de medicamentis simplicus.

Another important translator was John of Seville. Together with Dominicus Gundissalinus during the early days of the School, he was the main translator from Arabic into Castilian. John of Seville translated Secretum Secretorum, a 10th-century Arabic encyclopedic treatise on a wide range of topics, including statecraft, ethics, physiognomy, astrology, alchemy, magic and medicine, which was very influential in Europe during the High Middle Ages. He also translated many astrology treatises from al-Fargani, Abu Ma'shar al-Balkhi, al-Kindi, Aḥmad ibn Yusuf, al-Battani, Thābit ibn Qurra, al-Qabisi, etc. In philosophy he produced Latin translations of Ibn Sina (Avicenna), Costa ben Luca's De differentia spiritus et animae, Al-Farabi, Ibn Gabirol (Avicebron), Al-Ghazali, etc. Overall he is known for his intelligent syntheses, combined with his own observations and interpretations, particularly in astrology.

Rudolf of Bruges, a Flemish astronomer and translator from Arabic to Latin, was a pupil of Hermann of Carinthia. He translated into Latin the Liber de compositione astrolabii, a major work of Islamic science on the astrolabe, by Maslamah Ibn Ahmad al-Majriti, which he dedicated to his colleague John of Seville.

Dominicus Gundissalinus is considered to be the first appointed director of the Toledo School of Translators, beginning in 1180. At the beginning, Gundissalinus only translated from Greek into Latin or Castilian, as he did not have sufficient knowledge of Arabic. He depended on John of Seville for all translations in that language. Later in his career Gundissalinus mastered Arabic sufficiently to translate it by himself. Unlike his colleagues, he focused exclusively on philosophy, translating Greek and Arabic works and the commentaries of earlier Muslim philosophers of the peninsula. Among his important translations is Fons Vitæ (Meqor Hahayim), by the Jewish philosopher ibn Gabirol. At one time it was thought to be the work of the Christian scholastic Avicebron. Gundissalinus also translated several works of the major Muslim philosophers Avicenna and al-Ghazâlî. He is known for frequently eliminating passages and adding his own commentaries, rather than being scrupulously faithful to the originals.

Michael Scot, a Scotsman who studied at Oxford University and in Paris before settling in Toledo, also worked as a translator during this period. He translated Aristotle's works on homocentric spheres, De verificatione motuum coelestium, later used by Roger Bacon, and Historia animalium, 19 books, dated Oct 21, 1220. He also translated the works of al-Betrugi (Alpetragius) in 1217, On the Motions of the Heavens, and Averroes' influential commentaries on the scientific works of Aristotle, among many others.

Herman the German was the bishop of Astorga (1266 – 1272). He was a personal friend of Manfred of Sicily. His place of birth is unknown, but it is known that he was an important figure in Castile's intellectual life before being appointed Bishop. He is credited with translating Nicomachean Ethics by Aristotle in 1240, Rhetoricoric by Averroes, and the commentaries of Alfarabi regarding the Rhetoric of Aristotle. Herman also wrote his own philosophical commentary and summary of the Nicomachean Ethics.

=== Transitional period ===
During the decades following Archbishop Raimundo's death, the translating activity in Toledo decreased considerably, although it continued into the next century, and overlapped with Alfonso's School of Translators. At least one translator, Hermannus Alemannus, is known to have worked in both schools; he translated the Old Testament during the second period. This transitional period was when the first direct translations were made from Arabic into the vernacular Castilian.

Mark of Toledo, a Spanish physician and Canon of Toledo, translated the Qur'an and various medical works such as Hunayn ibn Ishaq's Liber isagogarum, Hippocrates' De aere aquis locis; and Hunayn Ibn Ishaq's versions of four of Galen's treatises: De tactu pulsus, De utilitate pulsus, Se motu membrorum, De motibus liquidis. He also translated Hunayn Ibn Ishaq's Isagoge ad Tegni Galieni, a series of Muslim religious treatises, dated 1213, and a Greek treatise on biology.

Alfred of Sareshel (also known as Alvred Alphitus, Walfred, Sarawel, Sarchel, Alphredus Philosophus, Alphredus Anglicus, etc.) was an English translator and philosopher who resided in Spain towards the end of the 12th century. He Translated the pseudo-Aristotelian De plantis, and the part on alchemy, Avicennae Mineralia of Ibn Sina's Sifa.

John of Toledo attended the School to study works of medicine before returning to England and being ordained cardinal. Later he traveled to Rome, where he became a personal physician to the Pope. He is believed to have translated into Latin several medical treatises which dealt with practical medicine.

Hermannus Alemannus worked in Toledo between 1240-1256. Although at the service of Manfred (Naples) from 1258–66, he returned to Spain where he became a naturalized citizen of the kingdom of Castile. He translated most of Aristotle's Rhetoric, interspersed with portions of Averroes' middle commentary and short fragments from Avicenna and Alfarabi, Aristotle's Aethica Nichomachea, middle commentary on the Poetics, finished Averroes' Commentario Medio y Poetica to Aristotle's Rhetoric, translated the Psalterio from the Hebrew text into Castilian, and translated from Arabic to Castilian an epitome of the Ethics known as the Summa Alexandrinorum.

=== Alfonso X and the establishment of the School ===
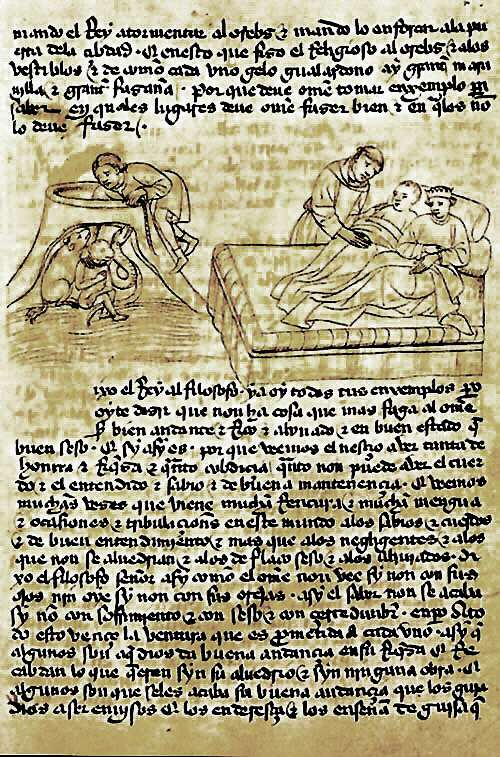
Calila e Dimna manuscript

Under King Alfonso X of Castile (known as the Wise), Toledo rose even higher in importance as a translation center, as well as for the writing of original scholarly works. The Crown did not officially recognize the School, but the team of scholars and translators shared their communal knowledge and taught newcomers new languages and translation methods. There were usually several persons involved in the same translation. The Castilian Crown paid for most of their work, and sometimes hired the most able translators from other parts of Spain and Europe to join the school at Toledo.

King Alfonso's decision to abandon Latin as the target language for the translations and use a revised vernacular version of Castilian, had very significant consequences on the development of the first foundations of the Spanish language. By his insisting that the texts translated be "llanos de entender" ("easy to understand"), he ensured that the texts would reach a much wider audience, both within Spain and in other European countries. The scholars from such nations as Italy, Germany, England or the Netherlands, who had moved to Toledo in order to translate medical, religious, classical and philosophical texts, returned to their countries with the acquired knowledge from classical Arabic, classical Greek, and ancient Hebrew. The King also commissioned the translation into Castilian of several "oriental" fables and tales which, although written in Arabic, were originally in Sanskrit, such as the Kalila wa-Dimna (Panchatantra) and the Sendebar.

Translation methods evolved under the direction of Alfonso X. Previously, a native speaker would verbally communicate the contents of the books to a scholar, who would dictate its Latin equivalent to a scribe, who wrote down the translated text. Under the new methodology, a translator, with expertise in several languages, dictated from the base language, translating into Castilian for the scribe, who wrote down the Castilian version. The scribe's work was later reviewed by one or several editors. Among those editors was the King, who had a keen interest in many disciplines, such as science, history, law, and literature. He effectively managed and selected each of the translators, and reviewed some of their work, encouraging intellectual debate.

Under Alfonso's leadership, Sephardic Jewish scientists and translators acquired a prominent role in the School. They were highly valued by the King because of their intellectual skills and mastery of the two languages most used in the translations: Arabic and Castilian. The King kept some of the Jewish scholars as his personal physicians, and recognized their services with splendid favors and praises. Alfonso's nephew Juan Manuel wrote that the King was so impressed with the intellectual level of the Jewish scholars that he commissioned the translation of the Talmud, the law of the Jews, as well as the Kabbalah. He intended to prove that the texts were a reflection of Christian doctrine, and that the Jews put their souls in peril by not acknowledging that. Such translations have been lost, although there could be a link with the later development of the Christian Kabbalah.

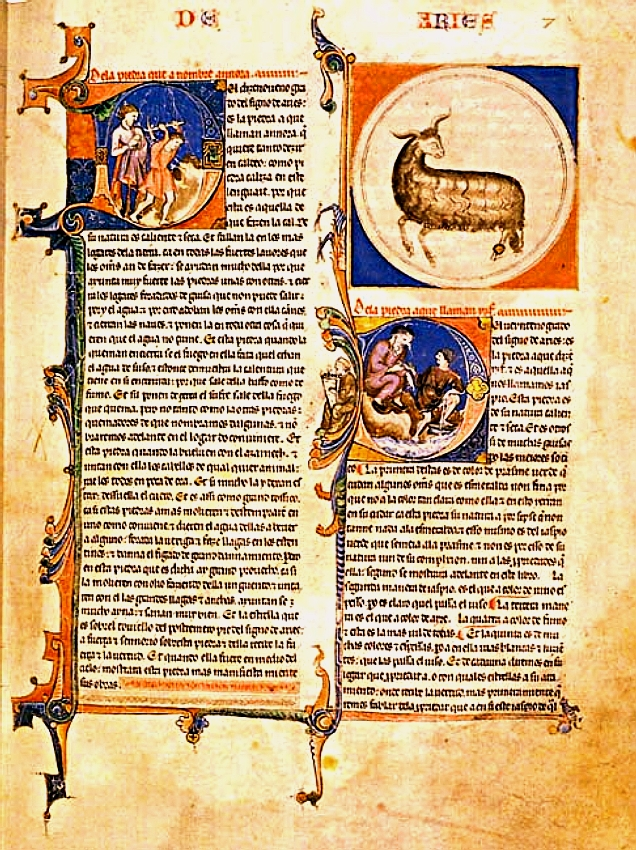
An illustrated page of the "Lapidario".

The first known translation of this period, the Lapidario, a book about the medical properties of various rocks and gems, was done by Yehuda ben Moshe Cohen assisted by Garci Pérez, when Alfonso was still infante. Alfonso obtained the book from a Jew who had kept it hidden, and commanded Yehuda to translate it from Arabic into the Castilian language.

Yehuda ben Moshe was one of the most notable Jewish translators during this period and also worked as the King's physician, even before Alfonso was crowned. Among his most notable translations besides the Lapidario are the Picatrix, a composite work of ancient treatises on magic and astrology, or the Tratado de la açafeha that was translated into Latin from an Arabic text by Al-Zarqali with the help of Guillelmus Anglicus. He also did the Tetrabiblon or Quatriparito (Ptolemy), 15 treatises on astrology (effects of stars on man and properties of 360 stones with which to ward off negative astral influences), and Los IIII libros de las estrellas de la ochaua espera, that the King Alfonso later ordered to be revised by Samuel ha-Levi, Joan de Mesina, and Joan de Cremona. He also contributed to the translation of another book on judicial astrology, the Libro conplido en los iudizios de las estrellas, that was, ironically, translated from Latin (as it was used among the Visigoths), into Arabic, and then back into Castilian and Latin.

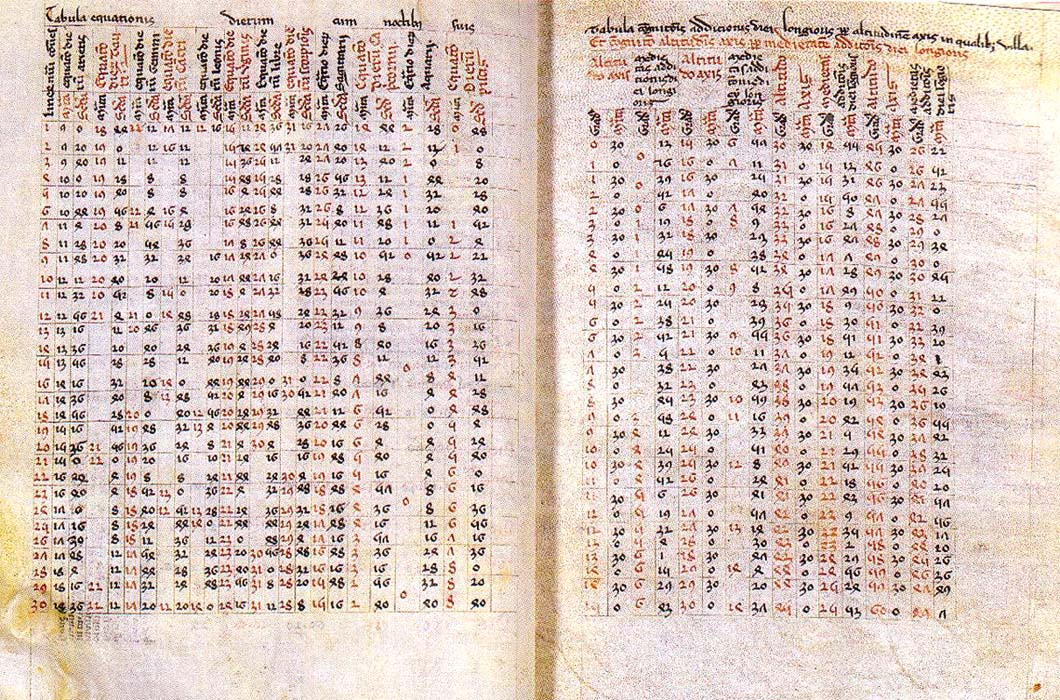
Alfonsine tables

Yehuda ben Moshe also collaborated in the translation of the Libro de las cruces, Libros del saber de Astronomía, and the famous Alfonsine tables, compiled by Isaac ibn Sid, that provided data for computing the position of the Sun, Moon and planets relative to the fixed stars, based on observations of astronomers that Alfonso had gathered in Toledo. Among them were Aben Raghel y Alquibicio and Aben Musio y Mohamat, from Seville, Joseph Aben Alí and Jacobo Abenvena, from Córdoba, and fifty more he brought from Gascony and Paris lured with big salaries, and to whom he also assigned the translation of Ptolemy's Quadripartitum and to gather books by Montesan and Algazel. As a result of their work, the Alfonsine tables became the most popular astronomical tables in Europe with updated versions being regularly reprinted for over three hundred years. Copernicus himself owned a copy.

Juan D'Aspa assisted Yehuda ben Moses Cohen in the literal translation of the Libro de la alcora and the Libro de las cruzes, while Guillén Arremon D'Aspa collaborated with Yehuda on the translation of the IIII libros de las estrellas de la ochaua espera.

Isaac ibn Sid was another renowned Jewish translator favored by the King; he was highly learned on astronomy, astrology, architecture and mathematics. At the King's direction, he produced a translation of the Libro de las armellas that was simple and easy to understand, so that "any man could readily use it". He also translated several scientific treatises, such as the Libro del astrolabio redondo, or the Libro del ataçir, a book on the flat astrolabe (for rapid calculations of movement of the stars), typically used by astrologers. King Alfonso wrote a preface to Isaac ibn Sid's translation, Lamina Universal, explaining that the original Arabic work was done in Toledo and from it Arzarquiel made his açafea. Isaac ibn Sid also contributed to the translation, Libro de quadrante pora rectificar: four works on the crafting of clocks, including the Libro del relogio dell argen uiuo and the Libro del relogio del palacio de las oras, The latter included designs for a palace with windows placed so that light entering them throughout the day would indicate the time on an internal patio. He is credited with the translation from Arabic of Astrolabio redondo (spherical astrolabe), Astrolabio llano (flat astrolabe), Constelaciones (constellations) and Lámina Universal (an instrument that improved on the astrolabe). He also contributed to translations of Armellas de Ptolemy, Piedra de la sombra (stone of the shadow, or sundial), Relox de agua (clepsydra, or water clock), Argente vivo o azogue (quicksilver or mercury), and Candela (candle clock).

Abraham of Toledo, physician to both Alfonso and his son Sancho, translated several books from Arabic into Spanish (Castilian), such as Al-Heitham's treatise on the construction of the universe, and al-Zarqālī's Astrolabe. Others included Samuel ha-Levi, who translated Libro del saber; Abulafia de Toledo, who was an author, compiler and translator, and Abraham Alfaqui, Ḥayyim Israel or Judah Cohen. Maestre Bernardo, an Islamic convert, assisted Abraham Alfaqui in the revision of the Libro de la açafeha, which had first been translated by a team led by Maestre Ferrando de Toledo, from the same school.

Among the Christian translators of this period were Alvaro de Oviedo, who translated Libro Conplido (De judiciis Astrologiae). Alvaro did the Latin translation while Yehuda ben Moshe's gave him an oral Spanish (Castilian) translation of the Arabic treatise by Aben Ragel. This is the only documented case of a double, simultaneous translation.

With Pietro de Reggio, the Italian Edigio de Tebladis de Parma translated the following into Latin: Ptolemy's Quatripartito and Jehudas's Spanish (Castilian) version of Ibn Aben Ragel's Liber de Judiciis Astrologiae (Libro conplido en los iudizios de las estrellas).

Maestre Joan de Cremona, who was the King's notary, translated parts of the Libro de las estrellas fixas and worked with Yehuda, Samuel ha-Levi and fellow Italian Juan de Mesina on the IIII Libros. Another King's notary and scribe, Bonaventura of Siena, translated Abraham's Spanish (Castilian) translation of the Escala de Mohama into French (Livre de leschiele Mahomet).

== Aftermath ==
After Alfonso's death, Sancho IV of Castile, his self-appointed successor, dismantled most of the team of translators, and soon most of its members transferred their efforts to other activities under new patronages, many of them leaving the city of Toledo.

== Legacy ==
The translations of works on different sciences, such as astronomy, astrology, algebra, medicine, etc. acted as a magnet for numerous scholars from all over Europe who came to Toledo eager to learn first hand about the contents of all those books that had been out of reach to Europeans for many centuries. Thanks to this group of scholars and writers, the knowledge acquired from the Arabic, Greek and Hebrew texts found its way into the heart of the universities in Europe. Although the works of Aristotle and Arab philosophers were banned at some European learning centers, such as the University of Paris in the early 1200s, the Toledo School's translations were accepted, due to their physical and cosmological nature.

Albertus Magnus based his systematization of Aristotelian philosophy, and much of his writings on astronomy, astrology, mineralogy, chemistry, zoology, physiology, and phrenology upon those translations made in Toledo. His pupil, Thomas Aquinas also used much of the translated work to bring Aristotle into his philosophical and theological treatises.

Roger Bacon relied on many of the Arabic translations to make important contributions in the fields of optics, astronomy, the natural sciences, chemistry and mathematics. Many other scholars of the Renaissance period used the translation of ibn al-Haitham's Kitab al-manazir, which was the most important optical treatise of ancient and medieval times. In general, most disciplines in the field of medicine in Europe greatly benefited from the translations made of works that reflected the advanced state of medicine in medieval Islam and some Asian countries.

Nicolaus Copernicus, the first scientist to formulate a comprehensive heliocentric cosmology, which placed the sun instead of the earth at the center of the universe, studied the translation of Ptolemy's astronomical Almagest. He also used the data for astronomical computing contained in the Alfonsine tables, of which he owned a copy after they were published in Venice in 1515. This work was the pioneer in a long list of efforts by European astronomers to attempt the computation of accurate tables of astrological predictions. They became the most popular astronomical tables in Europe and updated versions were regularly produced for three hundred years. Other translated works of astronomical nature, such as Theorica planetarum, were used as an introductory text in astronomy by European students all through the 15th century.

Another side effect of this linguistic enterprise was the promotion of a revised version of the Castilian language which, although it incorporated a large amount of scientific and technical vocabulary, had streamlined its syntax in order to be understood by people from all walks of life and to reach the masses, while being made suitable for higher expressions of thought. The contributions of all these scholars, both oral and written, under the tutelage and direction of Alfonso X, established the foundations of the modern supranational Spanish language.

== See also ==
- Translations during the Spanish Golden Age
- Latin translations of the 12th century
- Islamic contributions to Medieval Europe
