= Raymond de Sauvetât =

French monk

Francis Raymond de Sauvetât, or Raymond of Toledo, was the Archbishop of Toledo from 1125 to 1152. He was a French Benedictine monk, born in Gascony.

His most important work was the creation of a working group of translators that would later be known as the Toledo School of Translators. He ordered the reconstruction of the Cathedral of Toledo, reserving a section of the building for the School. The group recovered lost classical ancient texts of antiquity and promoted the delivery of major advances in the Toledo School of Medicine, algebra and astronomy.

He attended the Council of Rheims in 1148.

== Bibliography ==
- González Palencia, Ángel. El arzobispo Don Raimundo de Toledo y la escuela de traductores, Barcelona: Labor, 1942.
