= General Estoria =

The General estoria ("General History") is a universal history written on the initiative of Alfonso X of Castile (1252–1284), known as el Sabio (the Wise). The work was written in Old Spanish, a novelty in this historiographical genre, up until then regularly written in Latin. The work intended to narrate the world’s history from the beginnings (Creation, as narrated in the Bible) until the time of Alfonso, but it was never completed. The extant work covers from the creation until the birth of the virgin Mary, in the biblical section, and until year zero, in the history of the non-Jewish peoples. For the writing of this huge work, many older books were used as sources. Most of them were written in Latin, but there were French and Arabic sources, as well.

== Structure ==
The General estoria is divided into six parts (“partes”), the last of which was never completed. This structure was conceived to match the schema of the six ages of history as explained by Augustine of Hippo: the first part would have covered the facts happened between the creation and the great flood (first age), the second part would have narrated the history between the great flood and the birth of Abraham (second age), the third part would have covered the history from this moment until the reign of David (third age), the fourth part until the Babylonian captivity (fourth age), the fifth part until the birth of Jesus (fifth age), and the sixth from this moment until the reign of Alfonso X. But following the intended division of one world age narrated in each part, the first books would have been very short, and the last unmanageable. This led to the division of the work in parts (called in Spanish “partes”) of similar length, the first covering the first and second ages and nearly the first half of the third, the second narrating the second half of the third age and the first of the fourth, the third “parte” covering the second half of the fourth age, and the fourth and fifth parts narrating the fifth age of the world. From the sixth “parte” only the first pages are known, possibly the only ever written.

To achieve the ambitious aim of narrating the whole of mankind’s history, many sources and a complicated structure were needed to relate both the Jewish and the non-Jewish history. The redactors of the General estoria were able to ascertain which events happened at the same time in different civilisations thanks to a work by Eusebius of Caesarea, the second part of his Chronicle, known as Canons (Chronikoi kanones). They set then to work, narrating first some years from the Jewish history (drawn mainly from the Bible, Flavius Josephus, and Petrus Comestor), then all things happened in the same years in other cultural circles, such as Egypt, Greece, Carthage or Rome. For these contents, the sources are more numerous. The Alfonsine redactors did not maintain a strict distinction between historical and non-historical works, and treated mythological material, such as Ovid’s Metamorphoses, as history. Therein they were guided by the euhemeristic interpretation of myths, following which they thought gods and goddesses were in reality old kings, queens and heroes, worshipped as deities after their deaths.

The second unit in the organisation of the work, following the "parte" (part), is the one that wears the name of a biblical book: for example, the section in the first “parte” labelled as Éxodo (Exodus) contains the translation (with glosses and commentaries) of this book from the Bible and the history of all things happened at the same time in the whole world (among them, the beginnings of Athens). This textual behaviour begins to waver in the fourth “parte”, which covers the first half of the fifth age, after the Babylonian captivity (590 a. C.). Once the Jewish people have lost their “señorío” (political independence), the chronology is no longer guided by a Jewish ruler, but by the ruler of the most important empire (i. e. first Babylon, then Carthage, Macedonia and Rome); the name of the biblical books is likewise no more a cover for all world happenings of a period, but contains only the translation of that book, whereas the name of a “heathen” (gentil) ruler (e. g. Nabucodonosor / Nebuchadnezzar) gives their title to textual units where other material is also contained. Inside the biblical books or the section dedicated to the reign of a ruler, the following unit is the “libro” (book), which comprises from four or five until 80 or 90 “capítulos” (chapters). Not all biblical books are divided into minor books, many are directly organised in “capítulos” (the first procedure is usual for the First and Second parts, the last for the Third and Fourth).

The non-biblical history is much too important to the Alphonsine redactors to occupy only a couple of chapters at the end of a biblical narration, and since the second Part, the outstanding features or figures of the non-biblical world are often given a continuous spell of hundreds of chapters where only the history of this figure (e. g. Hercules, Romulus and Remus) or historical fact (e. g. Trojan War, Theban War) are treated. These “estorias unadas” (united or unitary stories) are situated at the end of the reign of the current Jewish ruler (following whose time the Alphonsines order, as has been explained, the chronology).

== Sources and source treatment ==
Prior to beginning the work on the General estoria, sources were thought of, looked for, copied, and translated. Probably not all desired works were found; on the other hand, many historical or mythological works from the Antiquity were not widely known in the Middle Ages (e. g. Homer). Among the most important sources are the Bible, Petrus Comestor (Historia Scholastica), Flavius Josephus (Antiquitates Iudaicae, not the original Greek, but a Latin version), Eusebius of Caesarea (Canons or Chronikoi kanones), Ovid (Metamorphoses and Heroides), Lucan (Pharsalia), Pliny (Historia naturalis), Flavius Eutropius (Breviarius historiae Romanae), Orosius (Historiae adversus paganos), Geoffrey of Monmouth (Historia regum Britanniae), the Historia de preliis, the Histoire ancienne jusqu’à César, probably the Fet des Romains and several Old French romans.

Not only the number of the sources, but also the scope of their utilisation is astounding: for example, more than half the verses of the Metamorphoses are contained in the General estoria, together with lengthy explanations and allegorical interpretations drawn from several glossators; two thirds of the Heroides are inserted in the text in the suitable moment (Second and Third parts), and the whole of the translation of Lucan’s Pharsalia is contained in the Fifth part.

After being translated, the different sources were combined in the historical relation. The sources treating the same fact were compared, and their similarities and differences carefully exposed; the narration of some years of the Jewish history always precedes, as said above, the part of the text dedicated to the happenings of the same period in other civilisations. Translation and commentary, facts and interpretation go hand in hand, completed by recapitulations and analogies with contemporary realities. Most of the content of the sources is acceptable for the Alphonsine redactors, and censorship or modifications due to a wish to avoid some thing are not frequent. Nevertheless, it is possible to find some places where this does occur: a very poetic tone appears to be sometimes objectionable, as personifications, metaphors or apostrophes are often not translated; the physical transformations narrated in the Metamorphoses need to be allegorically interpreted; some character traits (cruelty, doubts) are eliminated from the description of kings or powerful men and women.

== Manuscripts and editions ==
More than forty manuscripts of the General estoria are known. Given the dimensions of the work, they only copy one part or, sometimes, two half parts. Only the First and the Fourth Part are copied in currently extant manuscripts from the royal scriptorium, the rest are only known through later copies. Several of these later copies don't contain a whole part, but a selection, normally either the biblical or the non-biblical contents, and sometimes a copy contains e. g. the biblical content of two parts. For the Fifth part, no manuscript is known that copies the whole text: three contain the non-biblical section, three only part of the non-biblical section (only the translation of Pharsalia), and one the biblical section. It is possible than this part was never quite completed and the different materials combined in one narration. The First and Second parts of the work were edited and published in 1930 and 1957-1961 by Solalinde and Solalinde, Kasten and Oelschläger. Several scholars have published transcriptions of the text of some manuscripts and partial editions, which contributed to the better knowledge of the work. 2009, a team of philologists published the whole of the work.

Since 2016, an international team has been working on a digital edition, with wide-ranging scholarly notes, and translation into English, through the project "The Confluence of Religious Cultures in Medieval Historiography". Dr. Francisco Peña, a professor in the Faculty of Creative and Critical Studies at the University of British Columbia Okanagan, is leading a team of scholars to translate and digitize the General estoria.
