= Abraham bar Hiyya =

Catalan Jewish mathematician, astronomer and philosopher (1070-1136)

Abraham bar Ḥiyya ha-Nasi
- אברהם בר חייא הנשיא
- Born: c. 1070; Barcelona, County of Barcelona
- Died: 1136 or 1145; Narbonne or Provence
- Known for: Quadratic equation Hebrew calendar
- Scientific career
- Fields: Astronomy; Mathematics

Abraham bar Ḥiyya ha-Nasi (Note: Also Ḥayya. Other variants include Abraham ben Chija, Abraham ben Hiyya al-Bargeloni, Avraham ben Chiya Hanasi mi'Barcelona, Abraham ben Chiva, Abraham ben Chaja, and Rabbi Abrahamo Hispano filio Rabbi Haijae.) (Hebrew: ר׳ אַבְרָהָם בַּר חִיָּיא הַנָשִׂיא; c. 1070 – c. 1136 or 1145), also known as Abraham Savasorda, (Note: Latinisation of the Arabic Ṣāḥib al-Shurṭa (صاحب الشرطة), 'Chief of the Police'.) Abraham Albargeloni, and Abraham Judaeus, was a Catalan Jewish mathematician, astronomer, philosopher, and translator who lived in Barcelona, then part of the County of Barcelona in what is now Spain.

Bar Ḥiyya played an important role in transmitting Islamic and Arabic science to the Christian world through translation into Latin, and was probably the earliest figure to introduce algebra from the Muslim world into Christian Europe. He also composed original works on mathematics, astronomy, Jewish philosophy, chronology, and surveying. His most influential mathematical work was Ḥibbur ha-Meshiḥah ve-ha-Tishboret, a Hebrew treatise on practical geometry and algebra that was translated into latin in 1145 as Liber embadorum. The work contains the first known complete solution of the quadratic equation $x^2 - ax + b = c$ and influenced Fibonacci.

Among Bar Ḥiyya's philosophical works, one of the best known is Hegyon ha-Nefesh ha-Azuvah ("Meditation of the Sad Soul"). He also wrote the encyclopaedic Yesodei ha-Tevunah u-Migdal ha-Emunah ("Foundation of Understanding and Tower of Faith"), the astronomical work Hokhmat ha-Hizzayon ("Wisdom of the Revelation"), and the astrological Megillat ha-Megalleh ("Scroll of the Revealer"). Influenced by Neoplatonism, he held a comparatively positive view of the possibility of virtue outside the Jewish community. While regarding Israel as especially endowed through belief in God's unity and acceptance of the Torah, he maintained that all people possessed the capacity to attain the same belief.

== Biography ==
Abraham bar Ḥiyya was the great-grandson of Hezekiah ben David, the last Gaon of the Talmudic academies in Babylonia. Bar Ḥiyya occupied a high position in the royal court, serving as minister of police, and bore the title of governor (Hebrew: נשיא, romanized: nasi, lit. 'prince'). Scholars assume that Bar Hiyya would have obtained this title in the court of Banu Hud of Zaragoza-Lleida; there is even a record of a Jewish Savasorda there in the beginning of the 12th century. In his travelogues, Benjamin of Tudela mentions bar Ḥiyya living in Barcelona in the 1160s.

According to Adolph Drechsler, bar Ḥiyya was a pupil of Moshe ha-Darshan and teacher of Abraham ibn Ezra. He was held in high consideration by the ruler he served on account of his astronomical knowledge and had disputes with learned Catholic priests, to whom he demonstrated the accuracy of the Jewish calendar. Abraham bar Hiyya is said to have been a great astronomer and wrote some works on astronomy and geography. One talks about the form of the earth, the elements, and the structure of the spheres. Other works included papers on astrology, trigonometry, and music.

Some scholars think that the Magister Abraham who dictated De Astrolabio (probably at Toulouse) to Rudolf of Bruges (a work that the latter finished in 1143) was identical with Abraham bar Ḥiyya. Although the title "Sephardi" is always appended to his name, Barcelona was at the time no longer under Muslim rule, and therefore not part of Sepharad. Abraham Albargeloni (i.e., from Barcelona) thus belonged to the community of the Jews of the Crown of Aragon.

Catalonia joined Provence in 1112 and Aragon in 1137, and thus the County of Barcelona became the capital of a new Aragonese confederation called the Crown of Aragon. The kings of Aragon extended their domains to Occitania in what is now southern France. Abraham Albargeloni spent some time in Narbonne, where he composed some works for the Hachmei Provence, in which he complained about the Provençal community's ignorance of mathematics.

== Work ==
Abraham bar Ḥiyya was one of the most important figures in the scientific movement which made the Jews of Provence, the Spain, and Italy the intermediaries between Arabic science and the Christian world, in both his original works and his translations.

Bar Ḥiyya's Yesode ha-Tebunah u-Migdal ha-Emunah (Hebrew: יסודי התבונה ומגדל האמונה, lit. 'The Foundations of Understanding and the Tower of Faith'), usually referred to as the Encyclopedia, was the first European attempt to synthesize Greek and Arabic mathematics. Likely written in the first quarter of the 12th century, the book is said to elaborate on the interdependence of number theory, mathematical operations, business arithmetic, geometry, optics, and music. The book draws from a number of Greek sources then available in Arabic, as well as the works of al-Khwarizmi and Al-Karaji. Only a few short fragments of this work have been preserved.

Bar Ḥiyya's most notable work is his Ḥibbur ha-Meshiḥah ve-ha-Tishboret (Hebrew: חיבור המשיחה והתשבורת, lit. 'Treatise on Measurement and Calculation'), probably intended to be a part of the preceding work. This is the celebrated geometry translated in 1145 by Plato of Tivoli, under the title Liber embadorum a Savasordo in hebraico compositus. Fibonacci made the Latin translation of the Ḥibbūr the basis of his Practica Geometriae, following it even to the sameness of some of the examples.

Bar Ḥiyya also wrote two religious works in the field of Judaism and the Tanach: Hegyon ha-Nefesh ("Contemplation of the Soul") on repentance, and Megillat ha-Megalleh ("Scroll of the Revealer") on the redemption of the Jewish people. The latter was partly translated into Latin in the 14th century under the title Liber de redemptione Israhel. Even these religious works contain scientific and philosophical speculation. His Megillat ha-Megalleh was also astrological in nature, and drew a horoscope of favourable and unfavourable days. Bar Ḥiyya forecasted that the Messiah would appear in AM 5118 (1358 CE).

Abraham bar Ḥiyya wrote all his works in Hebrew, not in Judaeo-Arabic of the earlier Jewish scientific literature, which made him a pioneer in the use of the Hebrew language for scientific purposes.

=== Other notable works ===
- "Form of the Earth" (Hebrew: צורת הארץ), an astronomical work on the formation of the heavens and the earth, which was to have been followed by a second part on the course of the stars. A portion was translated into Latin by Sebastian Münster and Erasmus Oswald Schreckenfuchs. It appears also that complete translations into Latin and French were made. The Bodleian Library contains a copy with a commentary, apparently by Ḥayyim Lisker.
- "Calculation of the Courses of the Stars" (Hebrew: חשבון מהלכות הכוכבים), the sequel to the preceding work, which is found sometimes in manuscripts with the notes of Abraham ibn Ezra.
- "Tables" or "Tables of the Prince" (Hebrew: לוחות or לוחות הנשיא, Luḥot ha-Nasi), astronomical tables, called also the "Tables of Al-Battani" and the "Jerusalem Tables". Several manuscripts of this work contain notes by Abraham ibn Ezra.
- "Book of Intercalation" (Hebrew: ספר העבור). This work was published in 1851, in London, by Filipowski. It is the oldest-known Hebrew work treating of the calculation of the Hebrew calendar.
- "Meditation of the Soul" (Hebrew: הגיון הנפש), an ethical work upon a rationalistic religious basis. It was published in 1860 by Freimann, with a biography of the author (by the editor), a list of his works, and learned introduction by Rapoport.
- "Scroll of the Revealer" (Hebrew: מגלת המגלה), a controversial work in defense of the theory that the Messiah would appear in the year AM 5118 (AD 1358). Its fifth and last chapter, the largest part of the work, may be read as an independent treatise providing an astrological explanation of Jewish and universal history based on an analysis of the periodical conjunctions of Saturn and Jupiter.
- An apologetic epistle addressed to Judah ben Barzilai al-Barzeloni.

== Translations ==
Abraham bar Ḥiyya co-operated with a number of scholars in the translation of scientific works from Arabic into Latin, most notably Plato of Tivoli with their translation of Ptolemy's Tetrabiblos in 1138 at Barcelona. There remains doubt as to the particulars: a number of Jewish translators named Abraham existed during the 12th century, and it is not always possible to identify the one in question. Known translations of bar Ḥiyya include:

- De Horarum Electionibus, the well-known treatise of Ali ben Aḥmad al-Imrani.
- Capitula Centiloquium, astrological aphorisms.
- A commentary of Aḥmad ibn Yusuf on the Centiloquium, attributed to Ptolemy.
- De Astrolabio of Rudolph de Bruges.
- Liber Augmenti et Diminutionis, a treatise on mathematics.

In the preface to Ẓurat ha-Areẓ, bar Ḥiyya modestly states that, because none of the scientific works such as those which exist in Arabic were accessible to his brethren in France, he felt called upon to compose books which, though containing no research of his own, would help to popularize knowledge among Hebrew readers. His Hebrew terminology, therefore, occasionally lacks the clearness and precision of later writers and translators.

== Philosophy ==
Bar Ḥiyya was a pioneer in the field of philosophy: as shown by Guttmann in refutation of David Kaufmann's assumption that the Hegyon ha-Nefesh was originally written in Arabic, Abraham bar Ḥiyya had to wrestle with the difficulties of a language not yet adapted to philosophic terminology.

Whether composed especially for the Ten Days of Repentance, as Rapoport and Rosin think, or not, the object of the work was a practical, rather than a theoretical, one. It was to be a homily in four chapters on repentance based on the Hafṭarot of the Day of Atonement and Shabbat Shuvah. In it, he exhorts the reader to lead a life of purity and devotion. At the same time he does not hesitate to borrow ideas from non-Jewish philosophers, and he pays homage to the ancient Greek philosophers who, without knowledge of the Torah, arrived at certain fundamental truths regarding the beginning of things, though in an imperfect way, because both the end and the divine source of wisdom remained hidden to them. In his opinion the non-Jew may attain to as high a degree of godliness as the Jew.

He claimed that all gentile science had ultimately been learned by Jewish sages.

=== Matter and Form ===
Abraham bar Ḥiyya's philosophical system is neoplatonic like that of Solomon ibn Gabirol and of the author of Torot ha-Nefesh "Reflections on the Soul" as Plotinus stated:

Matter, being void of all reality, requires form to give it existence. Now the union of these two by the will of God, which brings them from a state of potentiality into one of actuality, is creation, time itself being simultaneously produced with the created things. Both matter and form consist of two different elements. There is pure and there is impure matter. So also there is form too sublime to mingle with matter, such as that of the angelic or the upper world; and form which, being receptive and hollow, is susceptible to mixture with matter. The upper world, while gazing upon the lower and radiating its higher light, causes the mixture of matter with receptive form, the "tohu va-bohu"; and out of pure matter the celestial bodies, and out of impure matter the four elements, were evolved. But while the first formed into an inseparable combination and the mixture of the latter is one which constantly changes, a third form exists which mixes with matter for a certain time, to live again in a disembodied state after its separation, and this is the human soul. According to its wisdom—which makes it seek the upper world, the pure lasting form—or its folly—which makes it follow the impure matter of the perishable world below—the soul of man partakes of the nature of either the one or the other but, his destination being to live forever like the angels, man has been appointed by God to be the ruler of all beings on earth; and in the same measure in which he fulfills or deviates from his destination, does he rise or fall in dignity above or below his fellow creatures.

He agrees with Plato that the soul in this world of flesh is imprisoned, while the animal soul craves for worldly pleasures, and experiences pain in foregoing them. Still, only the sensual man requires corrections of the flesh to liberate the soul from its bondage; the truly pious need not, or rather should not, undergo fasting or other forms of asceticism except such as the law has prescribed. But, precisely as man has been set apart among his fellow creatures as God's servant, so Israel is separate from the nations, the same three terms (bara, yaṣar, and asah) being used by the prophet for Israel's creation as for that of man in Genesis.

=== Three Classes of Pious Men ===
Like Baḥya ibn Paquda, Abraham bar Ḥiyya distinguishes three classes of pious men:

1. such as lead a life altogether apart from worldly pursuits and devoted only to God ("these are but few in number and may in their sovereignty over the world be regarded as one individuality").
2. such as take part in the world's affairs, but are, as regards their conduct, ruled only by the divine laws and statutes without concerning themselves with the rest of men (these form the "holy congregation" or the "faithful city")
3. such as lead righteous lives, but take care also that the wrong done outside of their sphere is punished and the good of all the people promoted (these form the "kingdom of justice" or the "righteous nation").

In accordance with these three classes of servants of God, he finds the laws of the Torah to be divided into three groups:

1. The Decalogue, containing the fundamental laws with especial reference to the God-devoted man who, like Moses, lives solely in the service of God (the singular being used because only Moses or the one who emulates him is addressed). The first of the Ten Commandments, which he considers merely as an introductory word, accentuates the divine origin and the eternal goal of the Law; the other nine present the various laws in relation to God, to domestic life, and to society at large. Each of these three classes again refers either to the heart or sentiment, to the speech or to the action of man.
2. The group of laws contained in the second, third, and fourth books of Moses, intended for the people of Israel during their wandering in the desert or during the Exile, to render them a holy congregation relying solely upon the special protection of God without resorting to warfare.
3. The Deuteronomic legislation intended for the people living in an agricultural state and forming a "kingdom of justice." However, in the time of the Messianic redemption, when the evil spirit shall have vanished altogether, when the sensual man shall have become a spiritual one, and the passions that created hatred and strife shall have given way to love of man and to faithful obedience to the will of God, no other laws than those given to the God-devoted one in the Decalogue—the law written upon the heart of man—will be necessary. Men, imbued solely with love for their fellows, free from sin, will rise to the standard of the God-devoted man, and, like him, share in the eternal bliss of God.

Guttmann has shown that Naḥmanides read and used the Hegyon ha-Nefesh, though occasionally differing from it; but while Saadia Gaon is elsewhere quoted by Abraham bar Ḥiyya, he never refers to him in Hegyon. Characteristic of the age is the fact that while Abraham bar Ḥiyya contended against every superstition, against the superstitions of the tequfoth, against prayers for the dead, and similar practises, he was, nevertheless, like Ibn Ezra, a firm believer in astrology. In his Megillat ha-Megalleh he calculated from Scripture the exact time for the advent of the Messiah to be the year of the world 5118. He wrote also a work on redemption, from which Isaac Abravanel appropriated many ideas. It is in defense of Judaism against Christian arguments, and also discusses Muhammed "the Insane", announcing the downfall of Islam, according to astrological calculation, for the year 4946 A.M.

== Mathematics ==
Bar Ḥiyya's theorem in a copy of the Talmud.

Bar Ḥiyya's Ḥibbur ha-meshīḥah ve-ha-tishboret contains the first appearance of quadratic equations in the West.

Bar Ḥiyya proved by the method of indivisibles the following equation for any circle: $A = C \times \tfrac{R}{2}$, where $A$ is the surface area, $C$ is the circumference length and $R$ is radius. The same proof appears in the commentary of the Tosafists (12th century) on the Babylonian Talmud.

== See also ==
- Golden age of Jewish culture in Spain
