= Yehuda ben Moshe =

Yehuda ben Moshe ha-Kohen lived during the 13th century and became the personal physician of King Alfonso X of Castile.

He also excelled as an astronomer and was a prominent translator and writer at the Toledo School of Translators where he translated important scientific works from Arabic and Hebrew into Castilian.

He was the Rabbi of the Synagogue of Toledo, and one of the most influential personalities of the Jewish community in the city at that time.

== Works ==
As a member of the School of Translators he helped Alvaro de Oviedo translate the version of Ibn Aben Ragel's Liber de Judiciis Astrologiae (Libro conplido en los iudizios de las estrellas), a treatise on judicial astrology that was used by Edigio de Tebladis de Parma and Pietro de Reggio.

He also translated the Lapidario, helped by the Christian Garci Pérez, and the famous Alfonsine tables, compiled by Isaac ibn Sid, that provided data for computing the position of the Sun, Moon and planets relative to the fixed stars.

Other works attributed to him are the Tratado de la açafeha into Latin, Tetrabiblon or Quatriparito (Ptolemy), 15 treatises on astrology (effects of stars on man and properties of 360 stones with which to ward off negative astral influences), the IIII libros de las estrellas de la ochaua espera, the Libro de las cruces and the Libros del saber de Astronomía.

== Mission to Portugal ==
The Crown Prince of Portugal, Denis of Portugal, had fallen ill with no physician being able to diagnose his malady. The king's priest had convinced the King that he was being punished by God for employing Jewish officials in his government. As a result, it was feared that both Christian kingdoms of Portugal and Spain, which were on the verge of forming an alliance, would change their attitude towards the Jews and would decree their expulsion.

Legend has it that Yehuda ben Moshe decided to take the initiative and traveled to Portugal, where he gained access to the patient and came to the conclusion that the ailing prince was suffering from a blood-clot. Yehuda performed a very difficult operation that turned out successfully, saving the life of the Prince. In this way, he succeeded in counteracting the threatened deportation of Jews from Spain and Portugal.

== See also ==
- Toledo School of Translators
