= Translations during the Spanish Golden Age =

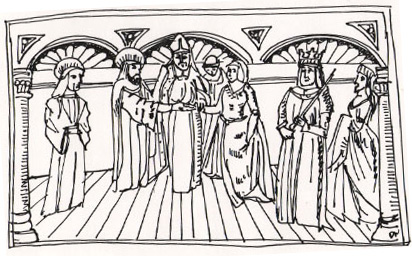
Medieval Spain

During the Spanish Golden Age a great number of translations were made, specially from Arabic, Latin and Greek classics, into Spanish, and in turn, from Spanish into other languages.

== Background ==
The Spanish Golden Age that expanded from the late 15th century to the 17th, witnessed the flourishing of cultural and artistic expressions. Many translations of works from Latin and Greek was published and spread throughout the rest of Europe. At the same time, the interest in ancient Arabic scientific and medical writings was still very prominent, in spite of the fact that a large part of the Muslim community who had refused to convert to Christianity, had been expelled from Spain along with similarly unconverted Jews during the year 1492.

The legacy from the prestigious Toledo School of Translators, established during the 12th and 13th centuries, had diminished considerably after the expulsion of the Moors and Jews from Spain in 1492, but in many of the old Arab quarters of Spanish cities the tradition of translation from Arabic to Latin or Spanish continued, although frequently in disguise to avoid the suspicions of the Inquisition. A known Spanish translation of the Muslim Koran, was made in 1456; however, after 1492 the situation of the Muslim community left in Spain changed drastically, when they were told to accept the Christian faith by means of baptism as a condition for remaining in Spain.

== Translations into Spanish ==
Those Muslims and Jews who chose to stay in Spain while maintaining their religion had to carry out their non-Christian rituals in secret. Their religious books also had to be kept hidden, and for many years they would use Aljamiado manuscripts, which used the Arabic alphabet for transcribing Romance languages such as Mozarabic, Spanish or Ladino. Aljamiado played a very important role in preserving some of the Moriscos Islamic beliefs and traditions secretly. However, as the years passed they grew increasingly unable to read the original texts, and turned more and more to Spanish translations. Even though many of these translations were destroyed by the Inquisition, some have survived, and bear witness to the laborious task of translating and then copying the religious books by hand. In the year 1606, a Morisco copier of the Koran in Spain made this marginal notation in a mixture of Castilian, Aljamiado and Arabic:

"Esta eskrito en letra de kristyanos ... rruega y suplica que por estar en dicha letra no lo tengan en menos de lo kes, antes en mucho; porque pues esta asi declarado, esta mas a vista de los muçlimes que saben leer el cristiano y no la letra de los muçlimes. Porque es cierto que dixo el annabî Muhammad que la mejor lengwa era la ke se entendía." Translation of the passage: "It is written in the letters of the Christians: (the writer) begs that on account of being in those letters it not be belittled, but rather respected; because, being set down in this way, it can better be seen by those Muslims who know how to read Christian, but not Muslim, letters. For it is true that the Prophet Muhammad said that the best language was the one that could be understood."

Nonetheless the successive Catholic monarchs were very keen on education, and created many universities and study centers, where translations took place. Besides the study and translation of philosophical and scientific works from Arabic, Greek, Hebrew and other languages from Europe and the Mediterranean basin, translations were made from literature works and orally transmuted legends and traditions from native languages in the New World.

== Translations from Spanish ==
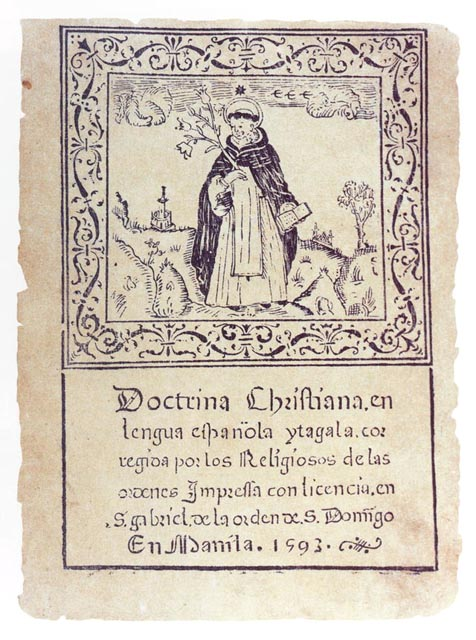
Cover of "Doctrina Christiana" from 1593, that was translated to Tagalog, Baybayin, and Chinese.

The particular aspects of Spanish Humanism in the Renaissance did much to shape the Spanish attitude towards literary translation. In this period the English language acquired a great number of Spanish words. English lexicographers began to accumulate lists of Spanish words, beginning with John Thorius in 1590, and for the next two centuries this interest for the Spanish language facilitated translation into the two languages as well as the mutual borrowing of words.

In the New World, translations were made specially of those books deemed appropriate for the propagation of the Christian Doctrine in far away lands, predominantly in America and Asia.

== Criticism ==
Most of the issues that arose from undertaking such enormous and varied amount of translations during this period are reflected in the Don Quijote de la Mancha of Miguel de Cervantes, where he attributes the authorship of his book to a variety of characters and translators, some with Moorish names, some Spanish, and some from other parts of Europe. Cervantes also expresses his opinion on the translation process, offering a rather despairing metaphor for the result of translations, which is frequently cited by contemporary theoreticians and translating experts:

Pero con todo eso, me parece que el traducir de una lengua en otra, como no sea de las reinas de las lenguas, griega y latina, es como quien mira los tapices flamencos por el revés: que aunque se veen las figuras, son llenas de hilos que las escurecen, y no se veen con la lisura y tez de la haz.

According to Cervantes, translations (with the exception of those made between Greek and Latin), are like looking at Flemish tapestry by its reverse side, where although the main figures can be discerned, they are obscured by the loose threads and lack the clarity of the front side.

== See also ==
- Spanish Golden Age
- Toledo School of Translators
- Latin translations of the 12th century
