= Literature of Alfonso X =

Texts written or promoted by a king of Castile

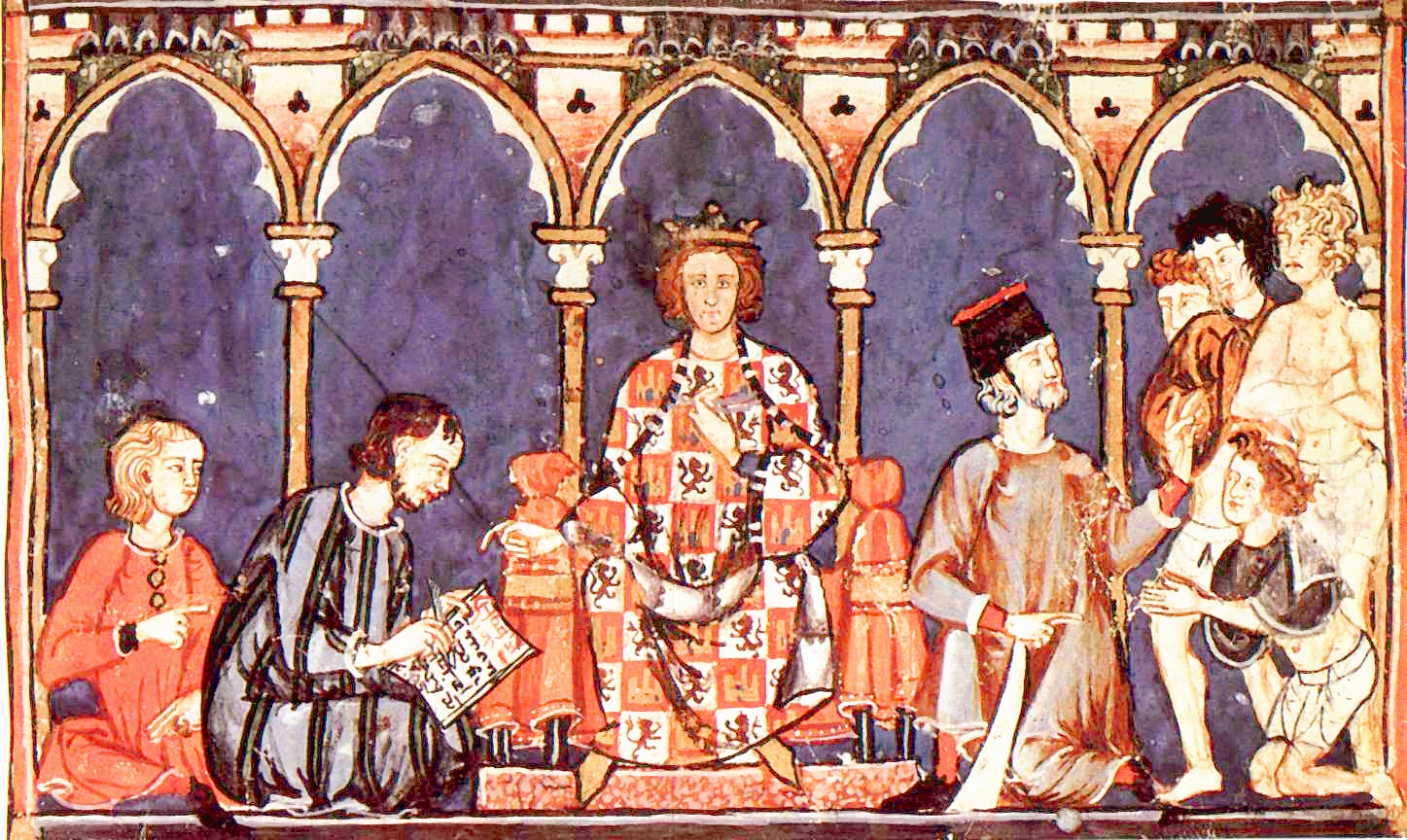

Alfonso X of Castile, also known as Alfonso the Wise, ruled from 1252 until 1284. One of Alfonso’s goals for his kingdom was to lift Castile out of the Dark Ages by producing a united, educated, artistic, and religious population. His desire to bring Castile into the mainstream of high civilization led to a boom of cultural activity, including the production and translation of a great deal of literature. The literature produced during his reign was intended to aid him in achieving his goal by giving the common people of Castile access to great intellectual works. Therefore, all of the prose attributed to Alfonso X’s efforts was written in the language of the common people, Castilian (later evolved to Spanish), rather than Latin, which was the language of prestige at that time. Although the works are generally attributed to Alfonso X, being a king with other business to deal with he did not himself write most of them. Instead, Alfonso’s role was that of choosing works to be produced and translated, funding the projects, selecting the true authors of the work, overseeing the production, and occasionally contributing personally.

Alongside this Castilian prose, Alfonso composed secular lyric poetry in Galician-Portuguese and directed the production of the Cantigas de Santa Maria, a collaborative courtly collection in whose composition he personally participated.

== Political works ==
Arguably the most important work produced in Alfonso X’s time was a political work: his advanced legal code known as the “Siete Partidas”. Although completed in 1265, Alfonso felt the code was too advanced to immediately be put into effect. The legal code actually used during his reign is known as the “Fuero Real” and was created by a team of Alfonso’s legal experts. Another political work ordered by Alfonso X was the “Setenario” which exclusively deals with religious matters.

=== Siete Partidas ===
The “Siete Partidas” was a legal code founded on Roman law and constructed by a group of legal experts chosen by Alfonso X. Although the work was probably completed by 1265, it did not go into effect until 1348 under the rule of Alfonso XI. Alfonso X felt that the code was too sophisticated for 13th-century Spain.

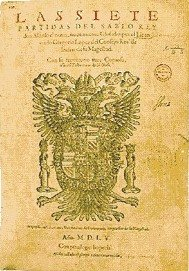

According to author Robert Burns, Alfonso attached a special symbolic meaning to the number seven, which is why he chose to construct his legal code in seven distinct divisions. Each division was furthered segmented by headings and subheadings. The first division of the code alone contains 24 headings and approximately 500 subheadings.

The divisions treat the following subjects:

- Division 1: The church and religious life
- Division 2: Public law and government
- Division 3: The administration of justice
- Division 4: Marriage
- Division 5: Commerce
- Division 6: Wills and inheritance
- Division 7: Crimes and punishments

The “Siete Partidas” was so advanced that it still functions in modern society. It was used as a basis for creating the United States laws used today, for which reason the image of Alfonso X appears in the US House of Representatives.

== Historical works ==
Alfonso X did not write the great historical works that were published in his time, but he did personally supervise their production. The Estoria de España is a history of the country of Spain. It begins in prehistoric times and follows the progression of events nearly to the time of Alfonso X himself. It probably would have reached that time period if work on that history had not been interrupted by Alfonso’s enthusiasm for the other historical work he produced: the General Estoria.

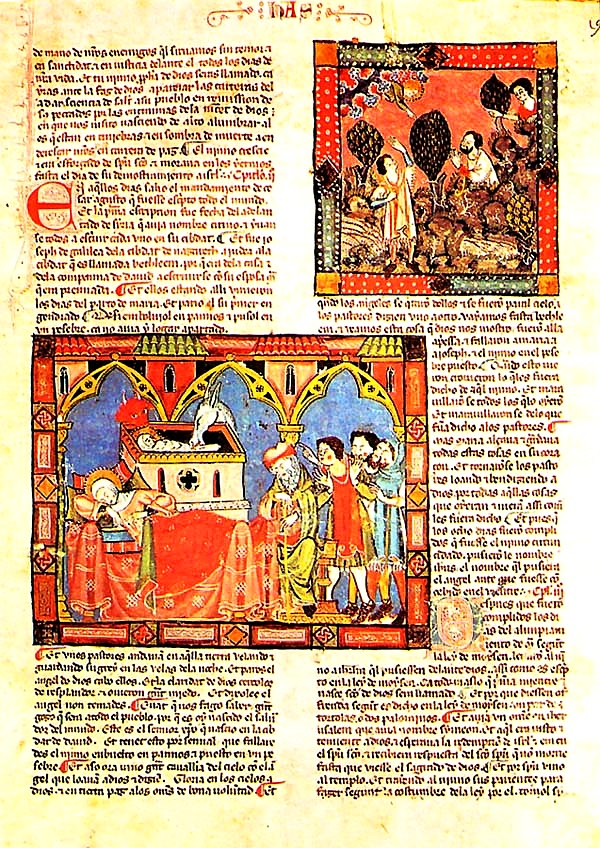

=== Estoria de España ===
The work narrates the history of the Spanish territory since Antiquity (from which they take even the most hazy details found in the Bible or in other sources) until the reign of Fernando III of Castile, father of Alfonso X. The work is divided into four large parts. The first includes a history of Ancient Rome; the second tells the history of the barbarian and Gothic kings; The third is a history of the Kingdom of Asturias from which the Reconquista (the Christian conquest of the Iberian Peninsule from Muslim rule) began. The fourth is a history of the Kingdoms of León and Castile. The principal sources were two Latin chronicles: Lucas de Tuy's Chronicon mundi (1236) Rodrigo Ximénez de Rada's De rebus Hispaniae (1243). Besides, other sources were also used, such as the Bible, classical Latin historiography, ecclesiastical legends, chansons de geste, and Arab historians.

=== General Estoria ===
The General Estoria covered the history of the entire world, beginning with Alfonso’s idea of the origins of the world (as narrated in the Bible) and ending close to the birth of Jesus Christ in the year zero. Not just a political history, the General Estoria also included the social and cultural history of the world. This work set the foundations for the development of the entire field of historiography in Spain. It was the first book of its type written in a vernacular language rather than in Latin. Alfonso’s desire for accuracy led to the use of the great variety of resources used for the work, including classical, Christian, Arabic and French sources. Alfonso hoped that the publication of such an important work in Castilian would elevate the tastes of the general population.

== Scientific works ==
Many of the scientific works produced by Alfonso X were translated from earlier Arabic works, although often with revisions or updated information. The works were translated into Castilian by a special panel of trilingual Jews. Four of the major scientific works produced under Alfonso’s direction were Tablas alfonsíes (Alfonsine Tables), Libros del saber de astronomía (Books of Wisdom of Astronomy), Libro de los juicios de las estrellas (Book of Judgments of Astrology), and Lapidario. The Tablas alfonsíes were translated and updated from work originally done by al-Zarqali.

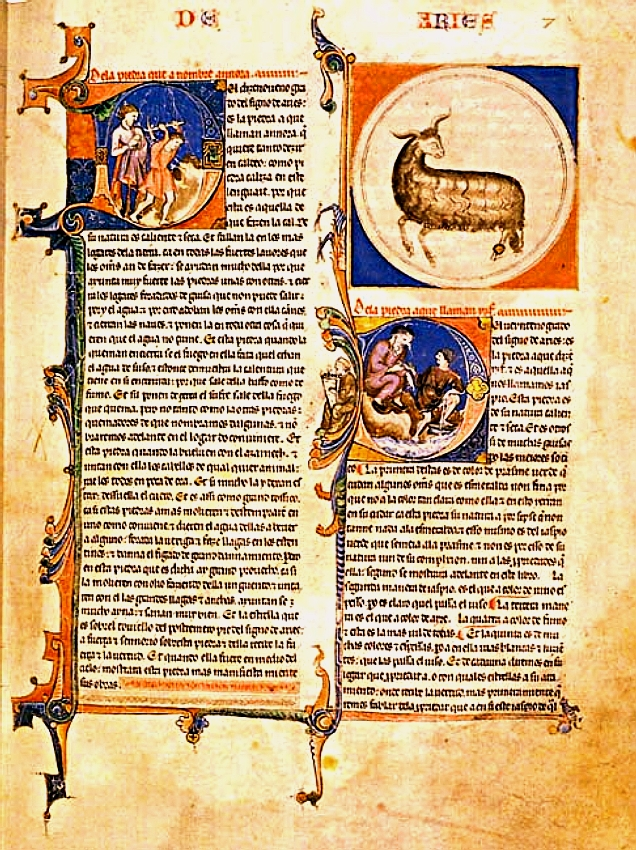

The tables chart the movements of heavenly bodies, and were only revised from the original after more than ten years of observations in Toledo. The Libros del saber de astronomía is a revision of the astronomical work of Ptolemy. It is composed of more than twelve different scientific treatises. Alfonso’s interest in this field also led him to search for the perfect astrological clock, but his efforts were ultimately unsuccessful.

The Libro de los juicios de las estrellas is a more subjective work, treating the field of astrology. This work is of increased interest because it offers insight into the evolution of the Spanish language. Words appearing multiple times in the work often have differing spellings, and Catalan words are occasionally incorporated.[4] The Lapidario, which discusses the medical properties of various rocks and gems and which includes fabulous illustrations, is also of interest to linguists. It includes frequent loanwords taken directly from Arabic where Castilian words did not yet exist, for example in naming the stones.

== Poetry ==
Alfonso was also king of Galicia and Leon and, in works produced under his authority, was numbered Alfonso IX, following the dynastic succession of the northwestern Iberian monarchy. He spent part of his youth in Galicia and was proficient in Galician-Portuguese, which was already an established language of literary prestige for courtly lyric poetry.

=== Secular poetry ===
Alfonso participated in the Galician-Portuguese troubadour tradition and composed secular poems in that language. Most of the surviving works attributed to him are satirical cantigas de escarnio e maldizer, although his corpus also includes other forms of courtly lyric. His poems refer to political events, military campaigns and other troubadours active at his court.

=== Cantigas de Santa Maria ===
The Cantigas de Santa Maria are a collection of more than four hundred Galician-Portuguese poems with musical notation, most of which narrate miracles of the Virgin Mary or sing her praises. They were produced collectively at Alfonso's court under his direction. His direct participation in the composition of at least some of the poems is generally accepted, although the extent of his personal authorship remains debated. The Galician troubadour Airas Nunes was probably among the collaborators involved in their composition, although the attribution of individual poems to him is uncertain. The collection combined devotional purposes with the representation of Alfonso's royal authority and political ambitions. The production of its most elaborate manuscripts may also have been connected with his attempts to obtain papal support for his claim to the imperial crown.

== Religious works ==
Alfonso X’s reign is known for its religious tolerance. His literature not only included translated works from Arabic cultures, but also included translations of non-Christian religious works. The Qur’an - the religious book of Islam - was translated into Castilian on orders from Alfonso. Also translated were the Talmud – the religious book of Judaism – and Cabala, a mystical sect of Judaism.[1]

== Other works ==
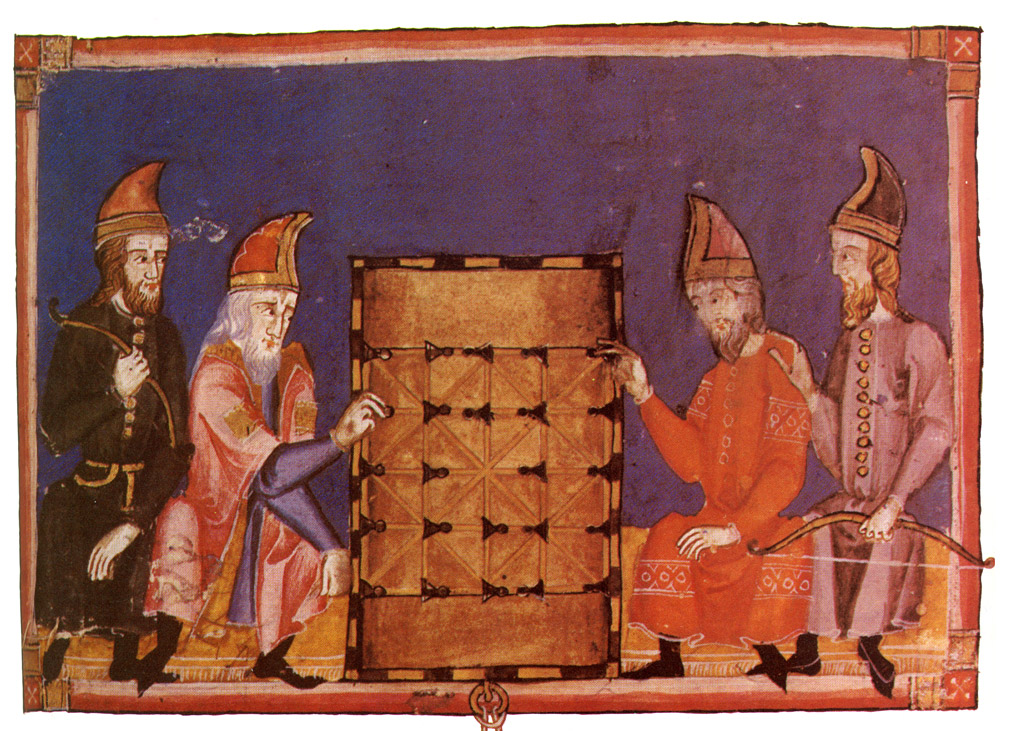

In keeping with his desire to elevate the tastes of the Spanish common man, one of the literary works that Alfonso X had translated was La escalera de Muhammad (Book of Muhammad's Ladder). The fantastic descriptions of Heaven and Hell influenced Dante in writing his Inferno. On top of intellectual works, Alfonso X also oversaw the production of more everyday literature. Calila e Dimna is a collection of stories originally from Asia. This work had a huge popular impact in Spain and also influenced the entire development of European fiction. Alfonso also had Libro de ajedrez, dados, y tablas (The Book of Games) translated into Castilian from Arabic and added illustrations with the goal of perfecting the work.

A poem of 1266 ("Pero da Ponte, paro-vos sinal") by Alfonso directed at the Galician troubadour Pero da Ponte accuses both him and Bernal de Bonaval of lacking skill in their art: "Vós nom trobades come proençal, / mais come Bernaldo de Bonaval; / por ende nom é trobar natural / pois que o del e do dem'aprendestes" ("You do not compose like a Provençal / but like Bernaldo de Bonaval / and therefore your poetry-making is not natural / for you learned it from him and from the [D]evil").
