= Libros del saber de astronomía =

Medieval encyclopedia of astronomy

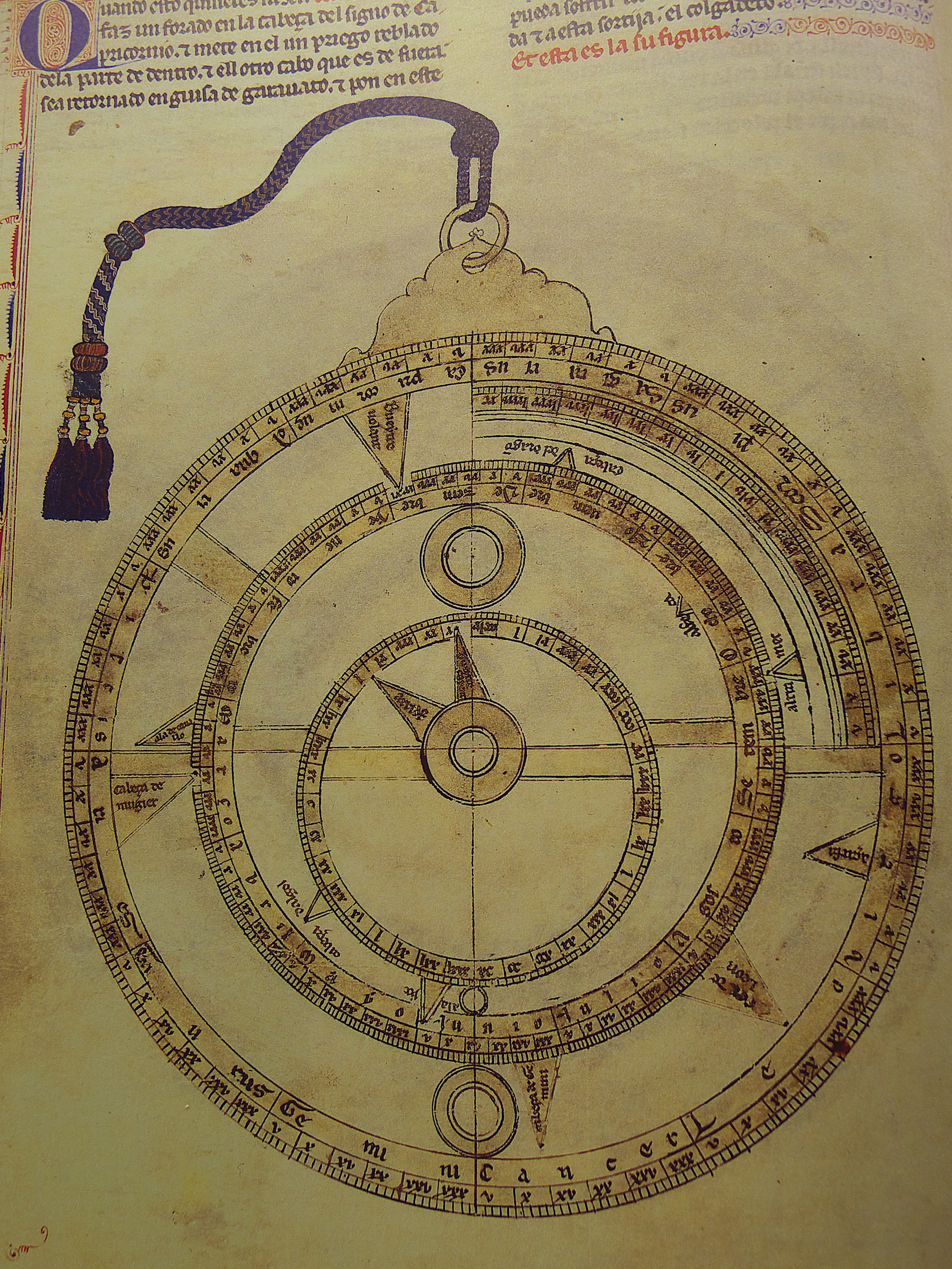
Page from Libro Primero del Astrolabio

The Libros del saber de astronomía (Old Spanish: Libro del saber de astrología), literally "book[s] of the wisdom of astronomy [astrology]", is a series of books of the medieval period, composed during the reign of Alfonso X of Castile. They describe the celestial bodies and the astronomical instruments existing at the time. The collection is a group of treatises on astronomical instruments, like the celestial sphere, the spherical and plane astrolabe, saphea, and universal plate for all latitudes, for uranography or star cartography that can be used for casting horoscopes. The purpose of the rest of the instruments, the quadrant of the type called vetus, sundial, clepsydras, is to determine the time, which was also needed to cast the horoscope. The king looked for separate works for the construction and use of each device.

Of the three scientific collections that Alfonso X commissioned between 1276 and 1279, this is the only one that survived with the full original text intact. It is a group of technical books, except for the first one, which is a description of the contents of the other treatises. The books are:

- Libro de la ochava espera, "Book of the eighth sphere"
- Libro del alcora
- Libro del astrolabio redondo, "Book of the round astrolabe"
- Libro del astrolabio llano, "Book of the flat astrolabe"
- Libro de la lámina universal, "Book of the universal plate", an instrument improving on the astrolabe
- Libro de la açafeha
- Libro de las armellas, "Book of the rings"
- Libro de las láminas de los siete planetas, "Book of the plates of the seven planets"
- Libro del quadrante, "Book of the quadrant"
- Libros de los relogios, "Books of the watches"

The books are written in medieval Spanish, with materials taken from Arabic sources from Andalucia. Use of the vernacular Castilian language was an innovation at the time, when most scientific texts were written in Latin. With this move, Alfonso X consolidated the Castilian language as the primary language of the unified kingdoms of Castille, Leon, and Galicia, and eventually of modern Spain. Later Alfonso also decided to translate the works into Latin, as he expected to extend his influence and had aspirations to the imperial throne in Germany.

The books are found in different versions. An original manuscript is kept in the Complutense University of Madrid.

== See also ==
- Literature of Alfonso X

== Bibliography ==
- Alvar Ezquerra, Carlos, et Megías, José Manuel, La literatura en la época de Sancho IV: Actas del Congreso Internacional., Alcalá de Henares, Servicio de Publicaciones de la Universidad de Alcalá, 1996. ISBN 84-8138-980-3.
- Cárdenas, Anthony J., A Learned King Enthralls Himself: Escapement and the Clock Mechanisms in Alfonso X's «Libro del saber de astrologia». en Constructions of Time in the Late Middle Ages, Carol Poster y Richard Utz (coords.) Evanston, IL: Northwestern University Press, 1997. 51-69.
- Deyermond, Alan D., Historia de la literatura española, vol. 1: La Edad Media, Barcelona, Ariel, 2001 (1^{e} ed. 1973). ISBN 84-344-8305-X
- Fernández-Ordóñez, Inés, «El taller historiográfico alfonsí. La Estoria de España y la General estoria en el marco de las obras promovidas por Alfonso el Sabio» , en J. Montoya y A. Rodríguez (coords.), El Scriptorium alfonsí: de los Libros de Astrología a las «Cantigas de Santa María», Madrid, Fundación Universidad Complutense, 1999.
- Guillón, Ricardo et al.., Diccionario de literatura española e hispanoamericana, Madrid, Alianza Editorial, 1993.
- Gómez Redondo, Fernando, Historia de la prosa medieval castellana, vol. I: La creación del discurso prosístico: el entramado cortesano, Madrid, Cátedra, 1998. ISBN 978-84-376-1638-4.
- —, Historia de la prosa medieval castellana. vol. II: El desarrollo de los géneros. La ficción caballeresca y el orden religioso, Madrid, Cátedra, 1999. ISBN 978-84-376-1730-5.
- —, Historia de la prosa medieval castellana. vol. III: Los orígenes del humanismo. El marco cultural de Enrique III y Juan II, Madrid, Cátedra, 2002. ISBN 978-84-376-2002-2.
- Haro Cortés, Marta, Los compendios de castigos del siglo XIII: técnicas narrativas y contenido ético, Valencia, Universitat de València, 1995. ISBN 84-370-2061-1.
- López Estrada, Francisco, y María Jesús Lacarra, Orígenes de la prosa, Madrid, Júcar, 1993. ISBN 84-334-8405-2.
- Rubio Tovar, Joaquín. La prosa medieval, Madrid, Playor, 1982. ISBN 84-359-0301-X.
