= Rudolf of Bruges =

12th-century Flemish translator

Rudolf (Rudolph) of Bruges was a Flemish translator from Arabic into Latin active in the twelfth century who worked at the Toledo School of Translators.

He was a pupil of Hermann of Carinthia. He was an astronomer, and translated into Latin as Liber de compositione astrolabii, a major work of Islamic science on the astrolabe by Maslamah Ibn Ahmad al-Majriti, that he dedicated to his colleague at the Toledo School, John of Seville.

He also produced commentary on Ptolemy's Planisphaerium by the same author.
