= Erasmus Oswald Schreckenfuchs =

Erasmus Oswald Schreckenfuchs (1511–1579) was an Austrian humanist, astronomer and Hebraist.

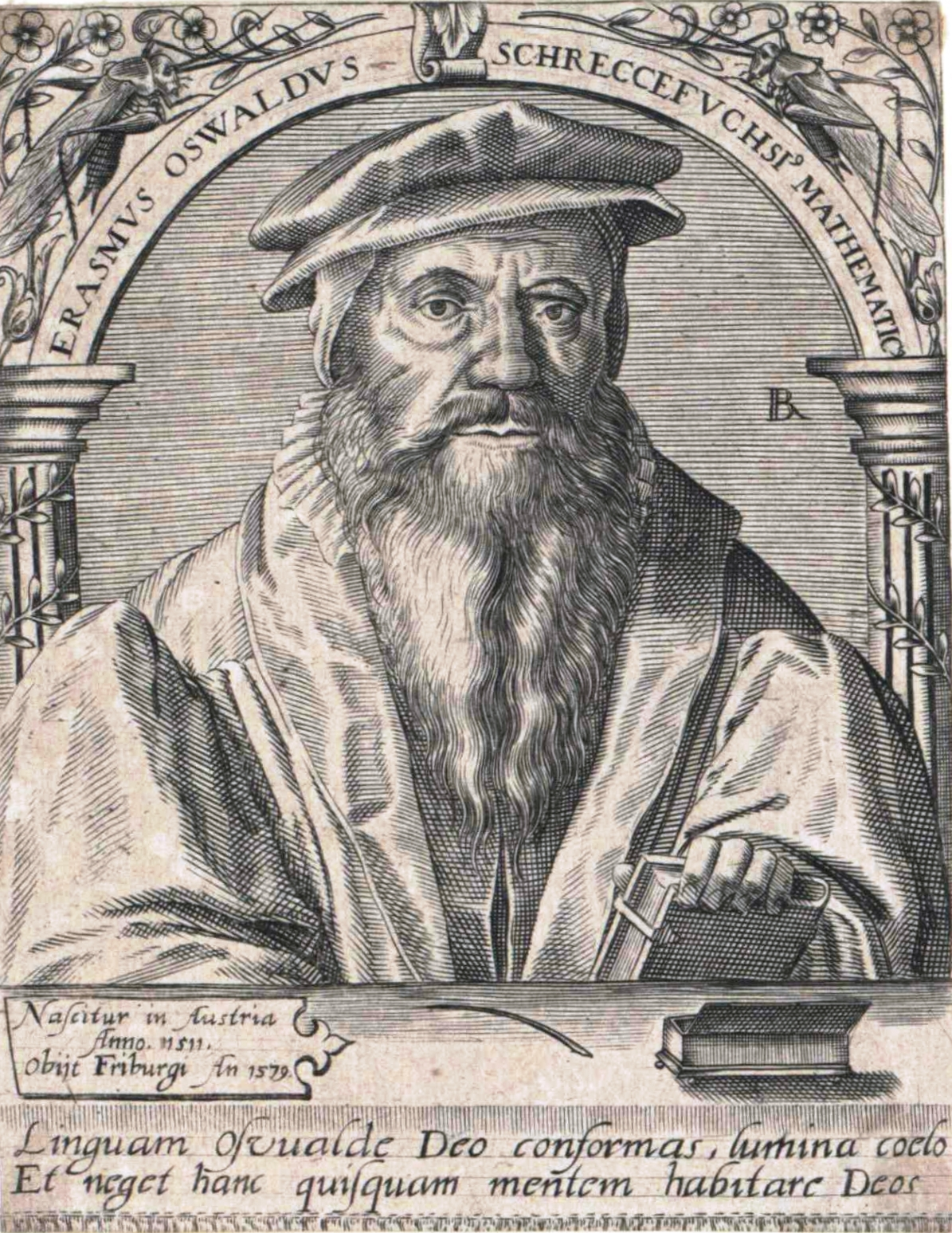
Erasmus Oswald Schreckenfuchs.

== Life ==
He was born in Merckenstein, near Bad Vöslau in Lower Austria, and studied in Vienna, Ingolstadt and Tübingen. He became a student and friend of Sebastian Münster. Together they translated (into Latin) the Form of the Earth of Abraham bar Hiyya, with work of Elijah ben Abraham Mizrahi.

He taught at Freiburg, where the Maltese mathematician Joannes Myriti was a student.

In 1551 he produced a commentary to the Almagest of Ptolemy. He published a targum for the Song of Solomon and Ecclesiastes (1553). He was a commentator in the sixteenth-and seventeenth century along with Joannes Baptista Capuanus, Maurus Florentinus, Christoph Clavius, Bartolomaeus Vespuccius, and Jesuit, who was an astronomer who had commentary that was held in high regard.

Erasmus Oswald Schreckenfuchs was a disciple of the Hebraists Sebastian Münster(1488-1552) and together they translated into Latin an encyclopedia titled Yesodot ha-Tevunah u-Migdal ha-Emunah known as ("The Foundations of Understanding and the Tower of Faith"), this encyclopedia contained geometry, arithmetic, astronomy, optics, and music.

His Commentaries on George Peurbach's New Theories of the Planets of 1556 were voluminous and broad-minded, considering an eclectic mix of astronomical theories, including those of Copernicus. The approach, however, was little concerned with scientific truth. Schreckenfuchs taught at Nuremberg, and found a follower in Christian Wursteisen.

Other works were Primum mobile (Basel, 1567), and a commentary on the De sphaera of Johannes de Sacrobosco of 1569.

Schreckenfuchs's idea of astronomy and astrology was not an unusual one. It was classified as two-celled, that is because one was without further division into practical and theoretical parts. Although it is divided into two cells, his book on focuses on one. Schreckenfuchs does not differentiate that topic by reference to parameters of planetary models and the use of tables. This led to the introduction of the second part of his theoretical astronomy, which is found in his book mentioned below.

When it came to his work Schreckenfuchs stated that the principles of the astronomical discipline are sought. He also believed that the science of stars is to be divided into two parts. He also believed that astronomy and astrology are encompassed by science. The most important belief he had was that astrology is the subject that is predicted from the motion of the stars and virtue, in addition to the position of the star and the stars nature of varieties of qualities and quantities of bodies in motion.

In his book 'On the Sphere,' it is titled this because it discusses his work about the sphere. Specifically, about the shape of body which is a part of different circles, which his students, using their imagination, should be able to transfer from material sphere to celestial sphere. Basically, he does not plan on discussing topics with students that deal with the planets that follow the sphere.
